= Mackenzie Dern =

American mixed martial artist and Brazilian Jiu-Jitsu practitioner (born 1993)

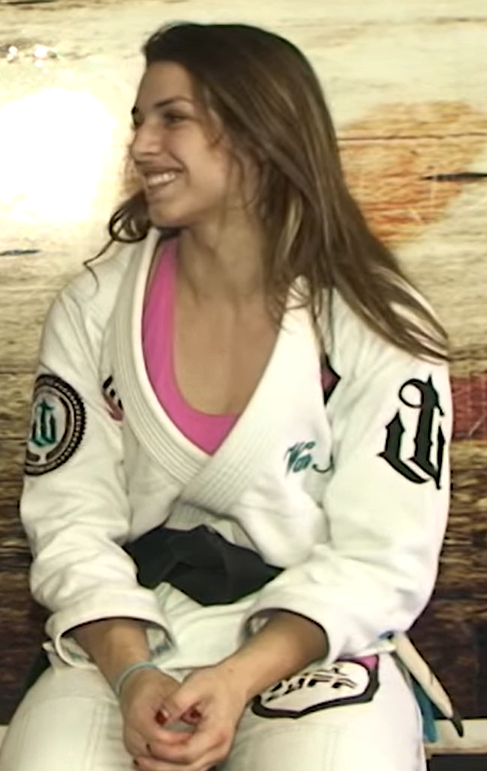
- Dern in 2015
- Born: Mackenzie Lynne Dern; March 24, 1993 (age 33); Phoenix, Arizona, U.S.
- Citizenship: United States; Brazil
- Height: 5 ft 4 in (1.63 m)
- Weight: 115 lb (52 kg; 8 st 3 lb)
- Division: Strawweight
- Reach: 63 in (160 cm)
- Style: Brazilian Jiu-Jitsu
- Fighting out of: Huntington Beach, California, U.S.
- Team: MMA Lab (2016–2018); Black House MMA (2018–2020); Checkmat; RVCA (2020–2023)
- Trainer: Jason Parillo
- Rank: 3rd degree black belt in Brazilian Jiu-Jitsu under Megaton Dias
- Years active: 2016–present (MMA)

Mixed martial arts record
- Total: 22
- Wins: 17
- By submission: 8
- By decision: 9
- Losses: 5
- By knockout: 1
- By decision: 4

Other information
- Mixed martial arts record from Sherdog

Medal record

Representing Brazil

Brazilian Jiu-Jitsu

World Jiu-Jitsu Championship
Gold medal – first place	2016 California, USA	-59 kg
Bronze medal – third place	2016 California, USA	Absolute

World Cup
Gold medal – first place	2016 Abu Dhabi	-55 kg

Pan Jiu-Jitsu Championship
Gold medal – first place	2016 California, USA	-59 kg
Bronze medal – third place	2016 California, USA	Absolute

European Championship
Gold medal – first place	2016 Lisbon, Portugal	-58kg
Gold medal – first place	2017 Lisbon, Portugal	-58kg

Asian Open Championship
Gold medal – first place	2016 Tokyo, Japan	-64g
Gold medal – first place	2016 Tokyo, Japan	Absolute

Representing United States

Submission Grappling

ADCC World Championship
Gold medal – first place	2015 São Paulo	-60kg

ADCC North American Championships
Gold medal – first place	2012 San Diego	-60kg

Brazilian Jiu-Jitsu

World Jiu-Jitsu Championship
Bronze medal – third place	2014 California, USA	-59 kg
Gold medal – first place	2015 California, USA	-59 kg
Bronze medal – third place	2015 California, USA	Absolute

Nogi World Jiu-Jitsu Championship
Gold medal – first place	2014 California, USA	-55.5 kg
Silver medal – second place	2014 California, USA	Absolute
Silver medal – second place	2015 California, USA	-55.5 kg
Gold medal – first place	2015 California, USA	Absolute

World Cup
Gold medal – first place	2015 Abu Dhabi	-55 kg
Gold medal – first place	2015 Abu Dhabi	Absolute

Pan Jiu-Jitsu Championship
Silver medal – second place	2014 California, USA	-59 kg
Bronze medal – third place	2014 California, USA	Absolute
Gold medal – first place	2015 California, USA	-59 kg
Silver medal – second place	2015 California, USA	Absolute

European Championship
Gold medal – first place	2013 Lisbon, Portugal	-58kg

Brazilian National Championship
Gold medal – first place	2014 Rio de Janeiro, Brazil	-58kg
Gold medal – first place	2015 Rio de Janeiro, Brazil	-58kg

Asian Open Championship
Gold medal – first place	2014 Tokyo, Japan	-58kg
Gold medal – first place	2014 Tokyo, Japan	Absolute
Gold medal – first place	2015 Tokyo, Japan	-58kg
Gold medal – first place	2015 Tokyo, Japan	Absolute

Mackenzie Lynne Dern (born March 24, 1993) is an American and Brazilian professional mixed martial artist and Brazilian Jiu-Jitsu practitioner currently competing in the women's strawweight division of the Ultimate Fighting Championship (UFC), where she is the current UFC Women's Strawweight Champion. She is a former world no. 1 ranked IBJJF competitor, currently ranked 6th among the female divisions. She is an ADCC and no gi BJJ (black belt) world champion. As of August 18, 2026, she is #5 in the UFC women's pound-for-pound rankings.

== Early life ==
Dern was born in Phoenix, Arizona. She is the daughter of Megaton Dias, a highly decorated grappling competitor. As a child, she grew up travelling back and forth between Arizona and her father's native Brazil. Dern is fluent in English and Portuguese. She has stated that Portuguese has become her primary language, explaining that "my dad and stepmom are both Brazilian. My boyfriend speaks Portuguese. I'm speaking Portuguese more than English. I still have lots of interactions in English of course. But I think in Portuguese, anything to do with fight is all in Portuguese in my mind, I dream in Portuguese."

Dern began training by the age of three and practicing with her father and stepmother who is also a black belt, Luciana Tavares. Mackenzie started competing at a young age, and began competing in the adult divisions at 14 years old. She has won a world championship in every belt level as she progressed to black belt rank, and at brown belt she defeated a male Judo black belt on Japanese TV. She was then promoted to black belt by her father in December 2012, three months prior to her 20th birthday. She graduated from Ironwood High School in Glendale, Arizona.

Due to her six 1st place finishes at the Asian Open, Mackenzie is the only female Jiu-Jitsu competitor to have won Gold Medals, at Black Belt level, at each of the 5 principal/highest ranking IBJJF Gi Championships - the other events are the Worlds, the Euros, the Pan Ams and the Brazilian Nationals. One of her biggest achievements in BJJ came when she managed to defeat Gabi Garcia despite a huge weight difference, becoming one of the few women to do so.

== Mixed martial arts ==
=== Legacy Fighting Alliance ===
Dern was scheduled to make her mixed martial arts debut against Kenia Rosas at Legacy FC 58. She won her debut by unanimous decision.

Dern was scheduled to fight Montana De La Rosa at Legacy FC 61. The bout was initially scheduled to be contested at strawweight, but was later changed to catchweight, as Dern missed weight by 2.8 lbs. She won the fight by a first round submission.

Dern was scheduled to fight Katherine Roy at LFA 6. Dern came in overweight for the second time in a row, missing weight by four pounds, and had to forfeit 20% of her purse. She won the fight by unanimous decision.

Dern moved up to flyweight for her fourth professional fight, being scheduled to fight Mandy Polk at LFA 24. She beat Polk by a first-round rear-naked choke.

After going 4–0 in her first four professional fights, Dern signed with Invicta Fighting Championship in November 2017.

=== Invicta Fighting Championship ===
Dern made her Invicta debut on December 8, 2017, at Invicta FC 26: Maia vs. Niedzwiedz against Kaline Medeiros. She won the fight via an armbar in round three.

=== Ultimate Fighting Championship ===
Dern made her promotional debut against Ashley Yoder on March 3, 2018, at UFC 222. She won the fight via split decision.

Dern faced Amanda Cooper on May 12, 2018 at UFC 224. At the weigh-ins, Dern weighed in at 123 pounds, 7 pounds over the strawweight non-title fight upper limit of 116 pounds. As a result, the bout proceeded at catchweight and Dern was fined 30% of her purse. Dern won the fight via submission through a rear naked choke in the first round.

After a hiatus from maternity leave, Dern faced Amanda Ribas on October 12, 2019 at UFC on ESPN+ 19. She lost the fight via unanimous decision.

Dern was expected to face Ariane Carnelossi on April 25, 2020 at UFC Fight Night 173. Carnelossi was forced to withdraw from the bout due to travel restriction.

Dern was scheduled to face Hannah Cifers on April 25, 2020. However, on April 9 the promotion announced that this event was postponed. The pairing eventually took place on May 30, 2020 at UFC on ESPN: Woodley vs. Burns. Dern won the fight with a first round kneebar - becoming the first woman to finish a fight by any form of leg lock in UFC history. This win also earned her her first Performance of the Night award.

Dern faced Randa Markos on September 19, 2020 at UFC Fight Night 178. She won the fight via submission in the first round. This win earned her her second straight Performance of the Night award.

Dern faced Virna Jandiroba on December 12, 2020 at UFC 256. Dern won the fight by unanimous decision.

Dern faced Nina Nunes on April 10, 2021 at UFC on ABC 2. She won the bout via first round armbar. This win earned her a Performance of the Night award.

Dern faced Marina Rodriguez on October 9, 2021 on UFC Fight Night 194. She lost the fight via unanimous decision. This fight earned her the Fight of the Night award.

Dern faced Tecia Torres on April 9, 2022 at UFC 273. Dern defeated Torres in a close bout by split decision.

Dern faced Yan Xiaonan on October 1, 2022 at UFC Fight Night 211. She lost the bout via majority decision.

Dern was scheduled to face Angela Hill on May 13, 2023 at UFC on ABC 4. However, the bout was instead moved back one week to headline UFC Fight Night 223. She won the fight via unanimous decision. This fight earned her the Fight of the Night award.

Dern faced former UFC Strawweight Champion Jéssica Andrade on November 11, 2023 at UFC 295. She lost the bout via TKO stoppage in the second round.

Dern faced Amanda Lemos, replacing Tatiana Suarez, on February 17, 2024, at UFC 298. Dern lost by unanimous decision. This fight earned her another Fight of the Night award.

Dern faced Loopy Godínez on August 3, 2024 at UFC on ABC 7. She won the fight by unanimous decision.

Dern was scheduled to face Amanda Ribas in a rematch on December 14, 2024 at UFC on ESPN 63. However, the bout was moved for unknown reasons to January 11, 2025 in order to serve as the main event at UFC Fight Night 249. Dern won the fight via an armbar submission at the end of the third round. This fight earned her another Performance of the Night award.

==== Strawweight championship ====
Dern faced former Invicta FC Strawweight Champion Virna Jandiroba in a rematch on October 25, 2025, at UFC 321 for the vacant UFC Women's Strawweight Championship. She won the championship by unanimous decision.

Dern made her first title defense against Gillian Robertson on August 15, 2026 at UFC 330. She won the fight by unanimous decision.

== Professional grappling career ==
After 7 years away from the sport, Dern announced her return to professional grappling competition in 2024. She was subsequently invited to compete in the under 55 kg division of the 2024 ADCC World Championship.

Dern withdrew from the 2024 ADCC World Championship, and instead competed against 2022 ADCC world champion Ffion Davies in a superfight at the inaugural Craig Jones Invitational on August 17, 2024. Dern lost the match by submission due to an armbar.

== Personal life ==
Dern was married to Brazilian professional surfer Wesley Santos. They separated in 2022. After going through divorce proceedings, Dern publicly accused Santos of physical abuse.

In February 2019, Dern announced that she had put her MMA career on hold due to pregnancy. Her daughter was born on June 9, 2019.

According to Dern, she left Black House MMA after a reported incident concerning her original coach, Juan Gomez, where he got into a physical altercation with her husband over a disagreement about money. However, Gomez disputed money being the reason and subsequently both Dern and Gomez were asked to leave the team.

== Championships and accomplishments ==
=== Mixed martial arts ===
- Ultimate Fighting Championship
  - UFC Women's Strawweight Championship (One time, Current)
    - One successful title defense
  - Performance of the Night (Four times) vs. Hannah Cifers, Randa Markos, Nina Ansaroff and Amanda Ribas 2
  - Fight of the Night (Three times) vs. Marina Rodriguez, Angela Hill and Amanda Lemos
    - Second most Post-Fight bonuses in UFC Women's Strawweight division history (7)
    - Tied (Ronda Rousey) for second most Post-Fight bonuses in UFC Women's history (7) (behind Jéssica Andrade)
  - Most submission wins in UFC Women's Strawweight division history (5)
    - Tied (Virna Jandiroba & Jaqueline Amorim) for most submission attempts in UFC Women's Strawweight division history (17)
    - Second most submission wins in UFC Women's history (5) (behind Gillian Robertson)
  - Second most wins in UFC Women's Strawweight division history (12)
  - Tied (Rose Namajunas, Amanda Lemos & Tatiana Suarez) for second most finishes in UFC Women's Strawweight division history (5)
  - Second most control time in UFC Women's Strawweight division history (1:14:29)
  - Third most top position time in UFC Women's Strawweight division history (54:44)
  - Fourth most total fight time in UFC Women's Strawweight division history (4:11:46)
  - Fifth most significant strikes in UFC Women's Strawweight division history (1555)
  - Fifth most bouts in UFC Women's Strawweight division history (17)
  - UFC Honors Awards
    - 2020: Fan's Choice Submission of the Year Nominee vs. Hannah Cifers
  - UFC.com Awards
    - 2018: Ranked #3 Newcomer of the Year
    - 2020: Ranked #2 Submission of the Year vs. Hannah Cifers
- MMA Fighting
  - 2025 Second Team MMA All-Star
- Uncrowned
  - 2025 #3 Ranked Women's Fighter of the Year

== Mixed martial arts record ==
Professional record breakdown
22 matches	17 wins	5 losses
By knockout	0	1
By submission	8	0
By decision	9	4

Res.	Record	Opponent	Method	Event	Date	Round	Time	Location	Notes
Win	17–5	Gillian Robertson	Decision (unanimous)	UFC 330	August 15, 2026	5	5:00	Philadelphia, Pennsylvania, United States	Defended the UFC Women's Strawweight Championship.
Win	16–5	Virna Jandiroba	Decision (unanimous)	UFC 321	October 25, 2025	5	5:00	Abu Dhabi, United Arab Emirates	Won the vacant UFC Women's Strawweight Championship.
Win	15–5	Amanda Ribas	Submission (armbar)	UFC Fight Night: Dern vs. Ribas 2	January 11, 2025	3	4:56	Las Vegas, Nevada, United States	Performance of the Night.
Win	14–5	Loopy Godínez	Decision (unanimous)	UFC on ABC: Sandhagen vs. Nurmagomedov	August 3, 2024	3	5:00	Abu Dhabi, United Arab Emirates	
Loss	13–5	Amanda Lemos	Decision (unanimous)	UFC 298	February 17, 2024	3	5:00	Anaheim, California, United States	Fight of the Night.
Loss	13–4	Jéssica Andrade	TKO (punches)	UFC 295	November 11, 2023	2	3:15	New York City, New York, United States	
Win	13–3	Angela Hill	Decision (unanimous)	UFC Fight Night: Dern vs. Hill	May 20, 2023	5	5:00	Las Vegas, Nevada, United States	Fight of the Night.
Loss	12–3	Yan Xiaonan	Decision (majority)	UFC Fight Night: Dern vs. Yan	October 1, 2022	5	5:00	Las Vegas, Nevada, United States	
Win	12–2	Tecia Torres	Decision (split)	UFC 273	April 9, 2022	3	5:00	Jacksonville, Florida, United States	
Loss	11–2	Marina Rodriguez	Decision (unanimous)	UFC Fight Night: Dern vs. Rodriguez	October 9, 2021	5	5:00	Las Vegas, Nevada, United States	Fight of the Night.
Win	11–1	Nina Nunes	Submission (armbar)	UFC on ABC: Vettori vs. Holland	April 10, 2021	1	4:48	Las Vegas, Nevada, United States	Performance of the Night.
Win	10–1	Virna Jandiroba	Decision (unanimous)	UFC 256	December 12, 2020	3	5:00	Las Vegas, Nevada, United States	
Win	9–1	Randa Markos	Submission (armbar)	UFC Fight Night: Covington vs. Woodley	September 19, 2020	1	3:44	Las Vegas, Nevada, United States	Performance of the Night.
Win	8–1	Hannah Cifers	Submission (kneebar)	UFC on ESPN: Woodley vs. Burns	May 30, 2020	1	2:36	Las Vegas, Nevada, United States	Performance of the Night.
Loss	7–1	Amanda Ribas	Decision (unanimous)	UFC Fight Night: Joanna vs. Waterson	October 12, 2019	3	5:00	Tampa, Florida, United States	
Win	7–0	Amanda Cooper	Submission (rear-naked choke)	UFC 224	May 12, 2018	1	2:27	Rio de Janeiro, Brazil	Catchweight (123 lb) bout; Dern missed weight.
Win	6–0	Ashley Yoder	Decision (split)	UFC 222	March 3, 2018	3	5:00	Las Vegas, Nevada, United States	
Win	5–0	Kaline Medeiros	Submission (armbar)	Invicta FC 26	December 8, 2017	3	4:45	Kansas City, Missouri, United States	Return to Strawweight. Performance of the Night.
Win	4–0	Mandy Polk	Submission (rear-naked choke)	LFA 24	October 13, 2017	1	2:55	Phoenix, Arizona, United States	Flyweight debut.
Win	3–0	Katherine Roy	Decision (unanimous)	LFA 6	March 10, 2017	3	5:00	San Antonio, Texas, United States	Catchweight (120 lb) bout; Dern missed weight.
Win	2–0	Montana De La Rosa	Submission (rear-naked choke)	Legacy FC 61	October 14, 2016	1	3:25	Dallas, Texas, United States	Catchweight (118.8 lb) bout; Dern missed weight.
Win	1–0	Kenia Rosas	Decision (unanimous)	Legacy FC 58	July 22, 2016	3	5:00	Lake Charles, Louisiana, United States	Strawweight debut.

== Grappling record ==
Records as per BJJHeroes website.

Rec.	Result	Opponent	Method	Event	Division	Stage	Gi	Year
Loss	75–25–1	Elvira Karppinen	Pts: 4x2	ADCC	60+KG	4F	No Gi	2017
Loss	75–24–1	Venla Luukkonen	Pts: 5x0	World Champ.	ABS	8F	Gi	2017
Loss	75–23–1	Beatriz Mesquita	Choke from back	Rio Fall Open	ABS	F	Gi	2017
Win	75–22–1	Katherine Jesus	Points	Rio Fall Open	ABS	SF	Gi	2017
Win	74–22–1	Pati Fontes	Cross choke	F2W 25	N/A	SPF	Gi	2017
Win	73–22–1	Emily Thylin	Referee Decision	European Open	58KG	F	Gi	2017
Win	72–22–1	Carolina Carriello	Bow and arrow	European Open	58KG	SF	Gi	2017
Loss	71–22–1	Tayane Porfirio	Pts: 5x2	European Open	ABS	4F	Gi	2017
Win	71–21–1	Venla Luukkonen	Pts: 11x2	European Open	ABS	4F	Gi	2017
Loss	70–21–1	Tayane Porfirio	Pts: 20x0	South American	ABS	F	Gi	2016
Win	70–20–1	Joaquina Bomfim	Adv	South American	ABS	SF	Gi	2016
Win	69–20–1	Barbara Gomes	Omoplata/Choke	South American	ABS	4F	Gi	2016
Win	68–20–1	Eloisa Souta	Scissor choke	South American	64KG	F	Gi	2016
Win	67–20–1	Megan Green	Kneebar	Grand Slam Tokyo	70KG	F	Gi	2016
Win	66–20–1	Megan Green	Kneebar	Grand Slam Tokyo	70KG	RR	Gi	2016
Win	65–20–1	Talita Alencar	Referee Decision	F2W Pro 12	88KG	SPF	Gi	2016
Loss	64–20–1	Dominyka Obelenyte	Pts: 6x4	World Champ.	ABS	SF	Gi	2016
Win	64–19–1	Fernanda Mazzelli	Referee Decision	World Champ.	ABS	58KG	4F	2016
Win	63–19–1	Michelle Nicolini	Pts: 6x6, Adv	World Champ.	58KG	F	Gi	2016
Win	62–19–1	Karen Antunes	Referee Decision	World Champ.	58KG	SF	Gi	2016
Loss	61–19–1	Andresa Correa	Pts: 2x0	Brasileiro	ABS	F	Gi	2016
Win	61–18–1	Fernanda Mazzelli	Points	Brasileiro	ABS	SF	Gi	2016
Win	60–18–1	Andresa Lidia	Choke from back	Brasileiro	ABS	4F	Gi	2016
Loss	59–18–1	Tayane Porfirio	Pts: 5x2	World Pro	ABS	4F	Gi	2016
Win	59–17–1	Anna Kavoura	Toe hold	World Pro	ABS	R1	Gi	2016
Win	58–17–1	Marina Ribeiro	Pts: 0x0, Adv	World Pro	55KG	F	Gi	2016
Win	57–17–1	Ariadne Oliveira	Pts: 5x0	World Pro	55KG	SF	Gi	2016
Win	56–17–1	Ana Alencar	Pts: 0x0, Adv	World Pro	55KG	4F	Gi	2016
Loss	55–17–1	Dominyka Obelenyte	Pts: 10x8	Pan American	ABS	SF	Gi	2016
Win	55–16–1	Fernanda Mazzelli	Pts: 2x0	Pan American	ABS	4F	Gi	2016
Win	54–16–1	Leah Taylor	Toe hold	Pan American	ABS	R1	Gi	2016
Win	53–16–1	Karen Antunes	Pts: 4x4, Adv	Pan American	58KG	F	Gi	2016
Win	52–16–1	Vianca Jager	Botinha	Pan American	58KG	SF	Gi	2016
Win	51–16–1	Rosie Snow	Armbar	F2W Pro 4	ABS	SPF	Gi	2016
Loss	50–16–1	Andresa Correa	Pts: 2x0	European Open	ABS	F	Gi	2016
Win	50–15–1	Olga Lyashevska	Toe hold	European Open	ABS	SF	Gi	2016
Win	49–15–1	Venla Luukkonen	Omoplata	European Open	ABS	4F	Gi	2016
Win	48–15–1	Maria Dolores	Toe hold	European Open	ABS	R1	Gi	2016
Win	47–15–1	Yasmine Wilson	Toe hold	European Open	58KG	F	Gi	2016
Win	46–15–1	Andresa Correa	Marcelotine	NoGi Worlds	ABS	F	No Gi	2015
Win	45–15–1	Emilie Thylin	Toe hold	NoGi Worlds	ABS	SF	No Gi	2015
Win	44–15–1	Josephine Masiello	Armbar	NoGi Worlds	ABS	4F	No Gi	2015
Loss	43–15–1	Tammi Musumeci	Pts: 6x2	NoGi Worlds	56KG	F	No Gi	2015
Win	43–14–1	Emilie Thylin	Kimura	NoGi Worlds	56KG	SF	No Gi	2015
Win	42–14–1	Isabelle Souza	Toe hold	Asian Open	ABS	F	Gi	2015
Win	41–14–1	Leanna Dittrich	Toe hold	Asian Open	ABS	SF	Gi	2015
Win	40–14–1	Michelle Nicolini	Pts: 4x4, Pen	ADCC	60KG	F	Gi	2015
Win	39–14–1	Bia Mesquita	Referee Decision	ADCC	60KG	SF	Gi	2015
Win	38–14–1	Kethe Engen	Toe hold	ADCC	60KG		Gi	2015
Win	37–14–1	Karen Antunes	Toe hold	FIVE SL	ABS	3RD	Gi	2015
Win	36–14–1	Fabiana Borges	Kneebar	FIVE SL	ABS	SF	Gi	2015
Win	35–14–1	Tammi Musumeci	Choke from back	FIVE SL	ABS	4F	Gi	2015
Loss	34–14–1	Dominyka Obelenyte	Points	World Champ.	ABS	SF	Gi	2015
Win	34–13–1	Ana Cordeiro	Armbar	World Champ.	ABS	4F	Gi	2015
Win	33–13–1	Luiza Monteiro	Pts: 8x0	World Champ.	ABS	8F	Gi	2015
Win	32–13–1	Michelle Nicolini	Choke from back	World Champ.	58KG	F	Gi	2015
Win	31–13–1	Tammi Musumeci	N/A	World Champ.	58KG	SF	Gi	2015
Win	30–13–1	Vanessa Oliveira	Pts: 6x0	World Pro	ABS	F	Gi	2015
Win	29–13–1	Gabrielle Garcia	Pts: 0x0, Pen	World Pro	ABS	SF	Gi	2015
Win	28–13–1	Jessica Cristina	Footlock	World Pro	ABS	4F	Gi	2015
Win	27–13–1	Nádia Melo	Toe hold	World Pro	ABS	R1	Gi	2015
Win	26–13–1	Michelle Nicolini	Pts: 2x0	World Pro	55KG	F	Gi	2015
Win	25–13–1	Ariadne Oliveira	Points	World Pro	55KG	F	Gi	2015
Loss	24–13–1	Gabrielle Garcia	Bread cutter	Pan American	ABS	F	Gi	2015
Win	24–12–1	Tammy Griego	Kneebar	Pan American	ABS	SF	Gi	2015
Win	23–12–1	Megan Nevill	Referee Decision	Pan American	ABS	4F	Gi	2015
Win	22–12–1	Tammi Musumeci	Kneebar	Pan American	58KG	F	Gi	2015
Win	21–12–1	Chelsea Donner	Ezekiel	Pan American	58KG	SF	Gi	2015
Loss	20–12–1	Michele Nicolini	Pts: 9x8	European	58KG	F	Gi	2015
Win	20–11–1	Laurence Cousin	Toe hold	European	58KG	SF	Gi	2015
Loss	19–11–1	Gabrielle Garcia	Clock choke	European	ABS	F	Gi	2015
Win	19–10–1	Dominyka Obelenyte	Referee Decision	European	ABS	SF	Gi	2015
Win	18–10–1	Laurence Fouillat	Ezekiel	European	ABS	4F	Gi	2015
Win	17–10–1	Nicole Inacio	Armbar	US Nat. Pro	ABS	F	Gi	2015
Loss	16–10–1	Ana Cordeiro	Kimura	Long Beach Pro	ABS	F	Gi	2014
Win	16–9–1	Karen Antunes	Toe hold	No Gi Worlds	56KG	F	No Gi	2014
Loss	15–9–1	Gabrielle Garcia	Americana	No Gi Worlds	ABS	F	No Gi	2014
Win	15–8–1	Leanna Dittrich	Pts: 3x0	No Gi Worlds	ABS	SF	No Gi	2014
Win	14–8–1	Nyjah Easton	Adv	No Gi Worlds	ABS	4F	No Gi	2014
Win	13–8–1	Chelsea Donner	Triangle	American Nat.	58KG	F	Gi	2014
Win	12–8–1	Laura Hallock	Choke from back	Dallas Open	ABS	F	Gi	2014
Win	11–8–1	Karen Antunes	Toe hold	Dallas Open	58KG	F	Gi	2014
Loss	10–8–1	Fernanda Mazzelli	Pts: 9x0	World Champ.	ABS	R1	Gi	2014
Loss	10–7–1	Tammi Musumeci	Palm to palm	World Champ.	58KG	SF	Gi	2014
Win	10–6–1	Ariadne de Oliveira	Points	World Champ.	58KG	4F	Gi	2014
Loss	9–6–1	Michelle Nicolini	Armbar	World Pro.	55KG	R1	Gi	2014
Win	9–5–1	Kanako Inaba	Mounted X choke	FIVE Illinois	64KG	F	Gi	2014
Win	8–5–1	Chelsea Donner	Pts: 2x0	FIVE Cali. 2	64KG	F	Gi	2014
Win	7–5–1	Pati Fontes	Mounted X choke	FIVE Cali. 2	64KG	SF	Gi	2014
Loss	6–5–1	Tammi Musumeci	Pts: 2x2, Adv	Pan American	58KG	F	Gi	2014
Win	6–4–1	Cristina Brandao	Omoplata/Choke	Pan American	58KG	SF	Gi	2014
Loss	5–4–1	Andresa Correa	N/A	Pan American	ABS	SF	Gi	2014
Win	5–3–1	Talita Nogueira	Pts: 4x4, Adv	Pan American	ABS	4F	Gi	2014
Win	4–3–1	Sophia Drysdale	Toe hold	Las Vegas Open	ABS	F	Gi	2013
Loss	3–3–1	Marina Ribeiro	Points	World Champ.	58KG	SF	Gi	2013
Loss	3–2–1	Luiza Monteiro	Pts: 0x0, Adv	Pan American	58KG	F	Gi	2013
Loss	3–1–1	Gabrielle Garcia	Clock choke	Pan American	ABS	SF	Gi	2013
Win	3–0–1	Talita Nogueira	Choke from back	Pan American	ABS	4F	Gi	2013
Win	2–0–1	Lora Hallock	Choke from back	SA Pro Trials	56KG	F	Gi	2013
Draw	1–0–1	Michelle Nicolini	N/A	Metamoris 2	ABS	SPF	Gi	2013
Win	1–0	Luiza Monteiro	Pts: 8x2	Copa Podio	ABS	SPF	Gi	2013

== Instructor lineage ==
Mitsuyo "Count Koma" Maeda → Carlos Gracie, Sr. → Helio Gracie → Royler Gracie → Megaton Dias → Mackenzie Dern

Achievements
Vacant Title last held by Zhang Weili	9th UFC Women's Strawweight Champion; October 25, 2025 – present	Incumbent
