= Pan IBJJF Jiu-Jitsu Championship =

Brazilian Jiu-Jitsu competitions

Pan Jiu-Jitsu Championship
Competition details
- Location: United States
- Nickname(s): "Pan Ams"
- Discipline: Brazilian Jiu-Jitsu
- Type: Open
- Organiser: IBJFF (Note: United States Brazilian Jiu-Jitsu Federation (1996 & 1997 – collaboration between CBJJ and United States Federation of Brazilian Jiu-Jitsu))

Divisions
- Current skill divisions: Age divisions: Juvenile 1 (16 years old); Juvenile 2 (17 years old); Adult (18+ years old); Master 1 (30-35 years old); Master 2 (36-40 years old); Master 3 (41-45 years old); Master 4 (46-50 years old); Master 5 (51-55 years old); Master 6 (56-60 years old); Master 7 (61 years old and older)
- Current weight divisions: Weight divisions Men: Open Class: Free; Ultra-Heavyweight: No maximum; Super Heavyweight: -222 lb (+100.5 kg); Heavyweight: -208 lb (-94.3 kg); Medium Heavyweight: -195 lb (-88.3 kg); Middleweight: -181.5 lb (-82.3 kg); Lightweight: -168 lb (-76 kg); Featherweight: -154.5 lb (-70 kg); Light Featherweight: -141.5 lb (-64 kg); Roosterweight: -127 lb (-57.5 kg); Women: Open Class: Free; Super Heavyweight: No maximum; Heavyweight: -175 lbs (-79.3kg); Medium Heavyweight: -163.5 lbs (-74 kg); Middleweight: -152.5 lb (-69 kg); Lightweight: -141.5 lbs (-64 kg); Featherweight: -129 lbs (-58.5kg); Light Featherweight: -118 lbs (-53.5kg); Roosterweight: -107 lbs (-48.5kg)

History
- First edition: 1996
- Editions: 28
- Most wins: Men – André Galvão (9); Women – Gabrielle Garcia (9)
- Most recent: 2025

The Pan Jiu-Jitsu Championship or Brazilian Jiu-Jitsu Pan American Championship (commonly known as Pan Ams or Pans), is the largest Brazilian jiu-jitsu tournament held in the Americas. The event is held annually by the International Brazilian Jiu-Jitsu Federation.

== History ==
Representing one of the first steps toward international expansion of Brazilian jiu-jitsu, the Pan-American Championship has been held annually since 1995. While the first event garnered only 250 athletes, the event has grown yearly with the 2022 edition in Florida reporting over 4,600 jiu-jitsu athletes registered to compete.

The tournament was originally held in Brazil but moved to the United States in 2007, reflecting the global expansion of Brazilian Jiu-Jitsu and its growing popularity in North America.

The Pan Championship is one of the four IBJJF Grand Slam events, which include the European Championship, Brazilian Nationals, and Worlds.

The IBJJF assigns a ranking weight to its tournaments, determining the number of points an athlete can earn. In the 2017/2018 IBJJF calendar, the Pan American Championship had a weighting of 4, making it second in importance only to the World Jiu-Jitsu Championship, which had a weighting of 7.

Many accomplished jiu-jitsu athletes have secured titles at the Pan Championship. In 2024, Gutemberg Pereira won the absolute male division by submitting Marcus Scooby with a rear-naked choke, while Gabi Pessanha took the absolute female title by submitting Izadora Cristina with a foot lock, securing double gold at the event.

The Pan Championship is regarded as one of the most prestigious tournaments in Brazilian Jiu-Jitsu. A strong performance at the Pan can elevate an athlete’s career, providing international recognition and opportunities for sponsorships and higher-level competition. The tournament also serves as a platform for the introduction of new techniques and strategic innovations, influencing the evolution of the sport.

The 2024 edition featured high-level performances across multiple divisions, reinforcing the event’s status as a premier competition in the sport.

The media coverage of the Pan Championship has grown significantly, with platforms like FloGrappling providing live broadcasts and in-depth analysis. This increased exposure has contributed to the global recognition of Brazilian Jiu-Jitsu, attracting new practitioners and fans worldwide. The Pan Championship’s legacy lies in its continuous role in the sport's popularity on a global scale.

== Host cities ==
The IBJJF Pan Jiu-Jitsu Championship has been held in several cities in the Western United States:

- Los Angeles, California (USA)
- Irvine, California (USA)
- Anaheim, California (USA)
- Las Vegas, Nevada (USA)
- Long Beach, California (USA)

== Pan Men's Champions ==
Year	Host	57 kg	64 kg	70 kg	76 kg	82 kg	88 kg	94 kg	100 kg	+100 kg	Absolute
1996	(United States)	(Brazil) Marcos Barreto (1/1)	(Brazil) Vinicius Magalhaes (1/2)	(Angola) João Roque (1/1)	(Brazil) Marcio Feitosa (1/4)	(Brazil) Alexandre Paiva (1/1)	(Brazil) Roberto Magalhaes (1/4)	(Brazil) Luis Roberto Duarte (1/1)	(Brazil) Roberto Correa (1/4)	(Brazil) Eduardo Galvão (1/1)	(Brazil) Rigan Machado (1/3)
1997	(United States)			(Brazil) Royler Gracie (1/2)	(Brazil) Marcio Feitosa (2/4)	(Brazil) Fernando Vasconcelos(1/2)	(Brazil) Ricardo Herriot (1/2)	(Brazil) Roberto Magalhaes (2/4)	(Brazil) Roberto Correa (2/4)	(Brazil) Rigan Machado (2/3)	(Brazil) Rigan Machado (3/3)
1998	(United States)		(Brazil) Luis Renato (1/1)	(Brazil) Vinicius Magalhaes (2/2)	(Brazil) Marcio Feitosa (3/4)	(Brazil) Fernando Vasconcelos (2/2)	(Brazil) Roberto Magalhaes (3/4)	(Brazil) Saulo Ribeiro (1/2)	(Brazil) Bruno Severiano (1/3)	(Brazil) Ryan Gracie (1/1)	(Brazil) Saulo Ribeiro (2/2)
1999	(United States)		(Brazil) Nay Cunha (1/1)	(Brazil) Royler Gracie (2/2)	(Brazil) Marcio Feitosa (4/4)	(Brazil) Bruno Severiano (2/3)	(Brazil) Antonio Schembri (1/1)	(Brazil) Ricardo Herriot (2/2)	(Brazil) Pericles Laudier (1/1)	(Brazil) Roberto Magalhaes (4/4)	(Brazil) Antonio Schembri (1/1)
2000	(United States)	(Brazil) Rafael Duarte (1/1)	(Brazil) João Eduardo (1/1)	(Brazil) Alexandre Carneiro (1/1)	(Brazil) Augusto Lopez (1/1)	(Brazil) Erick Santos (1/1)	(Brazil) Fabricio Prantera (1/1)	(Brazil) Diego Jose (1/1)	(Brazil) Bruno Mathias (1/1)	(Brazil) Luis Felipe (1/1)	(Brazil) Fabricio Monteiro (1/1)
2001	(United States)	(Japan) Takeo Tani (1/1)	(Brazil) Wellington Dias (1/1)	(Brazil) Sandro Santiago (1/1)	(Brazil) Edson Diniz (1/1)	(Brazil) Bruno Severiano (3/3)	(Brazil) Roberto Correa (3/4)	(Brazil) Fernando Pontes (1/1)	(Brazil) Roberto Tozi (1/1)	(Brazil) Jorge Patiano (1/1)	(Brazil) Xande Ribeiro (1/4)
2002	(United States)		(Brazil) Ricardo Vieira (1/1)	(Brazil) Leo Vieira (1/2)	(Brazil) Carlos Eduardo (1/2)	(Brazil) Delson Heleno (1/1)	(Brazil) Xande Ribeiro (2/4)	(Brazil) Fabio Leopoldo (1/1)	(Brazil) Alexandre Dantas (1/3)	(Brazil) Marcio Dantas (1/1)	(Brazil) Alexandre Dantas (2/3)
2003	(United States)		(Brazil) Leonardo Escobar (1/1)	(Brazil) Renato Migliaccio (1/1)	(Brazil) Carlos Eduardo (2/2)	(Brazil) Paulo Guilobel (1/1)	(Brazil) Cassio Werneck (1/1)	(Brazil) Roberto Correa (4/4)	(Brazil) Adriano Maciel (1/1)	(Brazil) Marcio Cruz (1/4)	(Brazil) Marcio Cruz (2/4)
2004	(United States)		(Brazil) Bibiano Fernandes (1/3)	(Brazil) Leo Vieira (2/2)	(Brazil) Daniel Moraes (1/1)	(Brazil) Fernando Augusto (1/1)	(Brazil) Ronaldo Souza (1/2)	(Brazil) Gabriel Vella](1/2)	(Brazil) Jorge Oliveira (1/1)	(Brazil) Alexandre Dantas (3/3)	(Brazil) Ronaldo Souza (2/2)
2005	(United States)			(Brazil) Bibiano Fernandes (2/3)	(Brazil) Mario Reis (1/2)	(Brazil) André Galvão (1/9)	(Brazil) Givanildo Santana (1/1)	(Brazil) Rodrigo Pinheiro (1/1)	(Brazil) Xande Ribeiro (3/4)	(Brazil) Marcio Cruz (3/4)	(Brazil) Mario Cruz (4/4)
2006	(United States)	(Brazil) Mauro Ayes (1/1)	(Japan) Dai Yoshida (1/1)	(Brazil) Bibiano Fernandes (3/3)	(Brazil) Tiago Alves (1/1)	(Brazil) André Galvão (2/9)	(Brazil) Demian Maia (1/1)	(Brazil) Braulio Estima (1/1)	(Brazil) Xande Ribeiro (4/4)	(Brazil) Rolles Gracie (1/1)	(Brazil) Roger Gracie (1/1)
2007	(United States)	(Brazil) Bruno Malfacine (1/6)	(Brazil) Robson Moura (1/1)	(Brazil) Rubens Charles (1/5)	(Brazil) Lucas Leite (1/4)	(Brazil) Marcelo Garcia (1/1)	(Brazil) Romulo Barral (1/2)	(Brazil) Eduardo Telles (1/1)	(United States) Rafael Lovato Jr. (1/2)	(Brazil) Rodrigo Medeiros (1/1)	(Brazil) Romulo Barral (2/2)
2008	(United States)	(Brazil) Bruno Malfacine (2/6)	(Brazil) Carlos Holanda (1/2)	(Brazil) Rubens Charles (2/5)	(Brazil) Celso Vinicius (1/1)	(Brazil) Gustavo Campos (1/2)	(Brazil) André Galvão (3/9)	(United States) Rafael Lovato Jr. (2/2)	(Brazil) Roberto Abreu (1/2)	(Brazil) Luis Theodoro (1/2)	(Brazil) André Galvão (4/9)
2009	(United States)	(Brazil) João Kuraoka (1/1)	(Japan) Yoshihiko Matsumoto (1/1)	(Brazil) Rubens Charles (3/5)	(Brazil) Lucas Lepri (1/4)	(Brazil) Lucas Leite (2/4)	(Brazil) Otavio Souza (1/2)	(Brazil) Roberto Alencar (1/2)	(Brazil) Antonio Braga Neto (1/4)	(Brazil) Marcio Corleta (1/1)	(Brazil) Antonio Braga Neto (2/4)
2010	(United States)	(Brazil) Bruno Malfacine (3/6)	(Brazil) Carlos Holanda (2/2)	(Brazil) Rubens Charles (4/5)	(Brazil) Michael Langhi (1/2)	(Brazil) Kayron Gracie (1/2)	(Brazil) Otavio Souza (2/2)	(Brazil) Bernardo Faria (1/6)	(Brazil) Antonio Braga Neto (3/4)	(Brazil) Gabriel Vella (2/2)	(Brazil) Bernardo Faria (2/6)
2011	(United States)	(Brazil) Rafael Freitas (1/1)	(Brazil) Caio Terra (1/3)	(Brazil) Bruno Frazatto (1/1)	(Brazil) Lucas Lepri (2/4)	(Brazil) Claudio Calasans (1/2)	(Brazil) André Galvão (5/9)	(Brazil) Rodolfo Vieira (1/2)	(Brazil) Marcus Almeida (1/3)	(Brazil) Antonio Braga Neto (4/4)	(Brazil) Rodolfo Vieira (2/2)
2012	(United States)	(Brazil) Caio Terra (2/3)	(Brazil) Bruno Malfacine (4/6)	(Brazil) Rafael Mendes (1/2)	(Brazil) Leandro Lo (1/8)	(Brazil) Claudio Calasans (2/2)	(Brazil) Kayron Gracie (2/2)	(Brazil) Lucas Leite (3/4)	(Brazil) Bernardo Faria (3/6)	(Brazil) Marcus Almeida (2/3)	(Brazil) Antônio Carlos Júnior (1/1)
2013	(United States)	(Brazil) Caio Terra (3/3)	(Brazil) Guilherme Mendes (1/1)	(Brazil) Rafael Mendes (2/2)	(Brazil) Michael Langhi (2/2)	(United States) Clark Gracie (1/1)	(Brazil) André Galvão (6/9)	(Brazil) Roberto Alencar (2/2)	(Brazil) Leo Nogueira (1/1)	(Brazil) Marcus Almeida (3/4)	(Brazil) Marcus Almeida (4/4)
2014	(United States)	(Brazil) João Rodriguez (1/1)	(Brazil) Paulo Miyao (1/3)	(Brazil) Mario Reis (2/2)	(Brazil) Lucas Lepri (3/4)	(Brazil) Leandro Lo (2/8)	(Brazil) Gustavo Campos (2/2)	(Brazil) Yuri Simões (1/1)	(Brazil) Luis Panza (1/2)	(Brazil) André Galvão (7/9)	(Brazil) André Galvão (8/9)
2015	(United States)	(Brazil) Bruno Malfacine (5/6)	(Brazil) Paulo Miyao (2/3)	(United States) Gianni Grippo (1/2)	(United States) Jonathan Torres (1/2)	(Brazil) Leandro Lo (3/8)	(United States) Keenan Cornelius (1/2)	(Brazil) Lucas Leite (4/4)	(Brazil) Bernardo Faria (4/6)	(Denmark) Alexander Trans(1/1)	(Brazil) Bernardo Faria (5/6)
2016	(United States)	(United States) Mikey Musumeci (1/1)	(Brazil) João Miyao (1/3)	(Brazil) Paulo Miyao (3/3)	(United States) Edwin Najmi (1/1)	(Brazil) Yago de Souza (1/1)	(Brazil) Leandro Lo (4/8)	(Brazil) Cassio Da Silva (1/1)	(Brazil) Luis Panza (2/2)	(Brazil) André Galvão (9/9)	(Brazil) Bernardo Faria (6/6)
2017	(United States)	(Brazil) Bruno Malfacine (6/6)	(Chile) Leonardo Enrique (2/3)	(Brazil) Rubens Charles (5/5)	(Brazil) Lucas Lepri (4/4)	(Brazil) Otavio Souza (1/2)	(Brazil) Patrick Gáudio (1/1)	(Brazil) Leandro Lo (5/8)	(Brazil) Erberth Santos (1/1)	(Brazil) João Gabriel Rocha (1/2)	(Brazil) Leandro Lo (6/8)
2018	(United States)	(Japan) Tomoyuki Hashimoto (1/1)	(Brazil) João Miyao (3/3)	(United States) Gianni Grippo (2/2)	(United States) Jonathan Torres (2/2)	(Brazil) Gabriel Arges (1/1)	(Brazil) Lucas Barbosa (1/2)	(Brazil) Leandro Lo (7/8)	(United States) Keenan Cornelius (2/2)	(Brazil) João Gabriel Rocha (2/2)	(Brazil) Leandro Lo (8/8)
2019	(United States)	(Brazil) Cleber Sousa (1/1)	(Chile) Leonardo Enrique (1/1)	(Brazil) Matheus Gabriel (1/1)	(Australia) Levi Jones-Leary (1/1)	(Brazil) Isaque Bahiense (1/1)	(Brazil) Gustavo Batista (1/4)	(Brazil) Kaynan Duarte (1/1)	(Brazil) Fellipe Andrew (1/5)	(Brazil) Ricardo Evangelista (1/1)	(Brazil) Lucas Barbosa (2/2)
2020	(United States)	(Brazil) Lucas Pinheiro (1/1)	(United States) Josh Cisneros (1/1)	(Brazil) Thiago Macedo (1/1)	(Brazil) Johnatha Alves (1/4)	(Brazil) Ronaldo Júnior (1/1)	(Brazil) Otavio Souza (2/2)	(Brazil) Gustavo Batista (2/4)	(Brazil) Guilherme Augusto (1/1)	(Brazil) Max Gimenis (1/1)	(Brazil) Fellipe Andrew (2/5)
2021	(United States)	(Brazil) Lívio Ribeiro (1/1)	(Brazil) Diego Oliveira (1/3)	(United States) Jamil Hill (1/1)	(Brazil) Johnatha Alves (2/4)	(Brazil) Tainan Dalpra (1/4)	(Brazil) André Porfirio (1/1)	(Brazil) Gustavo Batista (3/4)	(Brazil) Fellipe Andrew (3/5)	(Brazil) Victor Hugo (1/1)	(Brazil) Fellipe Andrew (4/5)
2022	(United States)	(Brazil) Carlos 'Bebeto' Oliveira (1/1)	(Brazil) Meyram Maquiné (1/1)	(Brazil) Alexssandro Sodré (1/1)	(Brazil) Johnatha Alves (3/4)	(Brazil) Tainan Dalpra (2/4)	(Costa Rica) Sebastian Rodriguez (1/1)	(Brazil) Dimitrius Souza (1/1)	(Brazil) Marcus Ribeiro (1/1)	(Brazil) Roberto Abreu (2/2)	(Brazil) Erich Munis (1/2)
2023	(United States)	(United Arab Emirates) Zayed Alkatheeri (1/1)	(Brazil) Diogo Reis (1/1)	(Brazil) Marcio Andre (1/1)	(Brazil) Johnatha Alves (4/4)	(Brazil) Tainan Dalpra (3/4)	(Brazil) Gustavo Batista (4/4)	(Poland) Adam Wardzinski (1/2)	(Brazil) Erich Munis (2/2)	(Brazil) Nicholas Meregali (1/2)	(Brazil) Nicholas Meregali (2/2)
2024	(United States)	(Brazil) Thalison Soares (1/1)	(Brazil) Diego Oliveira (2/3)	(Brazil) Kennedy Maciel (1/1)	(Brazil) Jackson Nagai (1/1)	(Brazil) Micael Galvão (1/1)	(United Arab Emirates) Uanderson Ferreira (1/1)	(Brazil) Fellipe Andrew (5/5)	(Brazil) Anderson Munis (1/1)	(Brazil) Yatan Bueno (1/1)	(Brazil) Gutemberg Pereira (1/2)
2025	(United States)	(United States) Jalen Fonacier (1/1)	(Brazil) Rerisson Gabriel (1/1)	(Brazil) Diego Oliveira (3/3)	(Brazil) Alexandre de Jesus (1/1)	(Brazil) Tainan Dalpra (4/4)	(Brazil) Francisco Lo (1/1)	(Poland) Adam Wardzinski (2/2)	(United States) Nolan Stuart (1/1)	(Brazil) Marcus 'Scooby' Ribeiro (1/1)	(Brazil) Gutemberg Pereira (2/2)

== Pan Women's Champions ==
Year	Host	-48 kg Rooster	-53 kg Light Feather	-58 kg Feather	-64 kg Light	-69 kg Middle	-74 kg Medium Heavy	-80 kg Heavy	+80 kg Super Heavy	Absolute
1999	(United States)				(Brazil) Bianca Andrade (1/1)	(Brazil) Mariana Coelho (1/3)		(Brazil) Rosangela Silva (1/1)		
2000	(United States)				(Brazil) Renata Ninomiya (1/1)	(Brazil) Tatina Chaves (1/1)		(Brazil) Mariana Coelho (2/3)		
2001	(United States)				(Brazil) Alessandra Filha (1/2)	(Brazil) Luciana Tavares (1/1)		(Brazil) Erica Paes(1/1)		
2002	(United States)				(Brazil) Alessandra Filha (2/2)	(Brazil) Kris Schade (1/1)		(Brazil) Luciana Dias (1/7)		
2003	(United States)		(Brazil) Kyra Gracie (1/3)	(Brazil) Leticia Ribeiro (1/2)	(Brazil) Alessandra Vieira (1/1)	(Brazil) Jaqueline Andrade (1/1)		(Brazil) Maria do Carmo Paixao (1/1)		
2004	(United States)		(Japan) Megumi Fujii (1/2)	(Brazil) Leticia Ribeiro (2/2)	(Brazil) Jeniffer Locke (1/1)	(United States) Kelly Paul (1/2	(Brazil) Jaqueline Williams (1/1)			
2005	(United States)		(Brazil) Tessa Queen (1/1)	(Brazil) Kyra Gracie (2/3)	(Brazil) Cindy Hales (1/1)	(United States) Kelly Paul (2/2)	(Brazil) Luciana Dias (2/7)			
2006	(United States)		(Japan) Megumi Fujii (2/2)		(Brazil) Mariana Coelho (3/3)	(Brazil) Kelly Paul (1/1)	(Brazil) Luciana Dias (3/7)			
2007	(United States)		(Brazil) Kanako Inaba (1/1)	(Brazil) Felicia Oh (1/1)	(Brazil) Kyra Gracie (3/3)	(Brazil) Luciana Dias (4/7)	(South Africa) Penny Thomas (1/1)			
2008	(United States)		(Brazil) Michelle Nicolini (1/3)		(Brazil) Gisele Braga] (1/1)	(Brazil) Ana Laura Cordeiro (1/4)	(Brazil) Luciana Dias (5/7)			(Brazil) Luciana Dias (6/7)
2009	(United States)		(Brazil) Claudia Kvenbo (1/1)	(Brazil) Fabiana Borges (1/2)	(Brazil) Ana Carolina Vidal (1/2)	(United States) Valerie Worthington (1/2)	(Brazil) Ana Laura Cordeiro (2/4)	(Brazil) Luciana Dias (7/7)		(Brazil) Ana Laura Cordeiro (3/4)
2010	(United States)		(Brazil) Michelle Nicolini (2/3)	(Brazil) Fabiana Borges(2/2)	(Brazil) Luana Alzuguir (1/4)	(United States) Hillary Williams (1/1)	(United States) Valerie Worthington (2/2)	(Brazil) Gabrielle Garcia (1/11)		(Brazil) Gabrielle Garcia (2/11)
2011	(United States)		(Brazil) Gezary Matuda (1/4)	(Brazil) Michelle Nicolini (3/3)	(Brazil) Beatriz Mesquita (1/7)	(Brazil) Luana Alzuguir (2/4)	(Brazil) Luiza Monteiro (1/7)	(Brazil) Gabrielle Garcia (3/11)		(Brazil) Luana Alzuguir (3/4)
2012	(United States)		(Brazil) Sofia Amarante (1/1)	(Brazil) Bruna Ribeiro (1/1)	(Brazil) Beatriz Mesquita (2/7)	(Brazil) Luana Alzuguir (4/4)	(Brazil) Hannette Staack (1/1)	(Brazil) Gabrielle Garcia (4/11)		(Brazil) Gabrielle Garcia (5/11)
2013	(United States)		(Brazil) Miriam Cerqueira (1/1)	(Brazil) Luiza Monteiro (2/7)	(Brazil) Ana Carolina Vidal (2/2)	(Brazil) Vanessa Oliveira (1/1)	(Brazil) Talita Nogueira (1/3)	(Brazil) Gabrielle Garcia (6/11)		(Brazil) Gabrielle Garcia (7/11)
2014	(United States)		(Brazil) Andrea Encarnacion (1/1)	(United States) Tammi Musumeci (1/2)	(Brazil) Beatriz Mesquita (3/7)	(Brazil) Luiza Monteiro (3/7)	(Brazil) Talita Nogueira (2/3)	(Brazil) Tammy Griego (1/1)		(Brazil) Beatriz Mesquita (4/7)
2015	(United States)		(Brazil) Gezary Matuda (2/4)	(United States) Mackenzie Dern (1/2)	(Brazil) Beatriz Mesquita (5/7)	(Brazil) Monique Elias (1/2)	(Brazil) Ana Laura Cordeiro (4/4)	(Lithuania) Dominyka Obelenyte (1/2)	(Brazil) Gabrielle Garcia (8/11)	(Brazil) Gabrielle Garcia (9/11)
2016	(United States)		(Brazil) Gezary Matuda (3/4)	(Brazil) Mackenzie Dern (2/2)	(Brazil) Beatriz Mesquita (6/7)	(Brazil) Luiza Monteiro (4/7)	(Brazil) Andresa Correa (1/2)	(Brazil) Talita Nogueira (3/3)	(Lithuania) Dominyka Obelenyte (2/2)	(Brazil) Andresa Correa (2/2)
2017	(United States)		(Brazil) Talita Alencar (1/1)	(Brazil) Bianca Basílio (1/2)	(United States) Tammi Musumeci (2/2)	(Brazil) Monique Elias (2/2)	(Brazil) Jessica Flowers (1/1)	(Brazil) Samela Shoham (1/1)	(Brazil) Tayane Porfirio (1/2)	(Brazil) Tayane Porfirio (2/2)
2018	(United States)		(Brazil) Gezary Matuda (4/4)	(Brazil) Karen Atunes (1/1)	(Brazil) Beatriz Mesquita (7/7)	(Brazil) Angelica Galvão (1/1)	(Brazil) Nathiely de Jesus (1/2)	(Poland) Maria Malyjasiak (1/2)	(Brazil) Claudia Doval (1/1)	(Brazil) Luiza Monteiro (5/7)
2019	(United States)	(Brazil) Mayssa Bastos (1/1)	(Brazil) Amanda Monteiro (1/1)	(United Kingdom) Ffion Davies (1/1)	(Brazil) Gabrielle McComb (1/1)	(Brazil) Ana Carolina Vidal (1/1)	(Brazil) Luiza Monteiro (6/7)	(Brazil) Nathiely de Jesus (2/2)	(Brazil) Gabrielle Garcia (10/11)	(Brazil) Gabrielle Garcia (11/11)
2020	(United States)		(Brazil) Mayssa Bastos (1/1)	(Brazil) Gabrielle McComb	(Brazil) Luiza Monteiro (6/7)	(Brazil) Rafaela Guedes (6/7)	(Brazil) Andressa Cintra (6/7)		(United States) Kendall Reusing	(Brazil) Rafaela Guedes (1/1)
2021	(United States)	(Brazil) Lavínia Barbosa (1/1)	(Brazil) Ana Rodrigues (1/1)	(Brazil) Bianca Basílio (2/2)	(Brazil) Nathalie Ribeiro (1/1)	(Brazil) Luiza Monteiro (7/7)	(Brazil) Ana Carolina Vieira (1/1)	(Poland) Maria Malyjasiak (2/2)	(Brazil) Gabrieli Pessanha (1/1)	(Brazil) Yara Soares (1/1)
2022	(United States)	(Brazil) Mayssa Bastos (1/1)	(United States) Kendall Reusing	(Brazil) Ana Rodrigues (1/1)	(Brazil) Nathalie Ribeiro (1/1)	(Brazil) Thamara Ferreira Silva	(Poland) Maria Malyjasiak (2/2)	(Brazil) Melissa Cueto	(Brazil) Gabrieli Pessanha (1/1)	(Brazil) Gabrieli Pessanha (1/1)
2023	(United States)	(Brazil) Jessica Caroline Coelho Dantas (1/1)	(Brazil) Mayssa Bastos (1/1)	(Brazil) Ana Rodrigues (1/1)	(Brazil) Luiza Monteiro (7/7)	(United States) Elisabeth Clay	(Brazil) Ana Carolina Vieira (fighter)	(Brazil) Larissa Dias de Almeida	(Brazil) Gabrieli Pessanha (1/1)	(Brazil) Gabrieli Pessanha (1/1)
2024	(United States)	(United States) Elisabeth Clay	(Brazil) Mayssa Bastos (1/1)	(Brazil) Larissa Campos Carvalho	(Brazil) Janaina Maia de Menezes	(Brazil) Thalyta Stefhane Lima Silva	(Brazil) Ingridd Alves de Sousa	(Brazil) Izadora Cristina Silva	(Brazil) Gabrieli Pessanha (1/1)	(Brazil) Gabrieli Pessanha (1/1)
2025	(United States)	(Brazil) Jessica Caroline Coelho Dantas (1/1)	(Brazil) Thaynara Victoria Soares da Silva	(Brazil) Maria Luiza Nunes Pinto	(Brazil) Janaina Maia de Menezes	(Brazil) Gisele Constante Menezes Tavares	(Brazil) Maria Carolina Barón Vicentini	(Brazil) Larissa Dias de Almeida	(Brazil) Gabrieli Pessanha (1/1)	(Brazil) Gabrieli Pessanha (1/1)

== See also ==
- IBJJF
- World Championship
- World No-Gi Championship
- Pan Jiu-Jitsu No-Gi Championship
- European Open Championship
- European Open Nogi Championship
- Brazilian National Jiu-Jitsu Championship
- Brazilian Nationals Jiu-Jitsu No-Gi Championship
- Asian Open Championship
- Abu Dhabi Combat Club Submission Wrestling World Championship
