= European IBJJF Jiu-Jitsu Championship =

Brazilian Jiu-Jitsu competitions

Competition details
- Location: Lisbon, Portugal
- Local name(s): Euros
- Discipline: Brazilian Jiu-Jitsu
- Organiser: IBJJF

Divisions
- Current weight divisions: Weight classes: Men: Ultra Heavy (+100.5 kg); Super Heavy (-100.5 kg); Heavy (-94.3 kg); Medium Heavy (-88.3 kg); Middle (-82.3 kg); Light (-76 kg); Feather (-70 kg); Light Feather -(-64 kg); Rooster (-57.5 kg); Women: Super Heavy (+79.3kg); Heavy (-79.3kg); Medium Heavy (-74 kg); Medium (-69 kg); Light (-64 kg); Feather (-58.5kg); Light Feather (-53.5kg); Rooster (-48.5kg)

History
- First edition: 2004
- Editions: 19
- Most wins: Michael Langhi and Lúcio Rodrigues (6) and female Luana Alzuguir (5)
- Most recent: 2023 European Championship

The European IBJJF Jiu-Jitsu Championship (also: European Championship or European Open) is the most prestigious and largest Brazilian Jiu-Jitsu tournament held in Europe by the International Brazilian Jiu-Jitsu Federation (IBJJF). The tournament is an open championship accepting competitors from all countries and is considered one of the most important competitions in the lead-up to the Worlds.

== History ==
The first edition of the European Championship took place in 2004 in Lisbon, Portugal. Over the years, the tournament grew significantly in size and prestige, becoming one of the four major IBJJF tournaments, alongside the World Championship, the Pan IBJJF Jiu-Jitsu Championship, and the Brazilian Nationals.

For nearly two decades, the event was held annually in Lisbon. However, after the COVID-19 pandemic caused the cancellation of the 2021 edition, the tournament relocated to Rome, Italy in 2022. Since 2023, the competition has been hosted in Paris, France.

== Importance ==
The IBJJF assigns point weightings to its tournaments to help calculate an athlete's ranking. For the 2017/2018 IBJJF season, the European Championship had a weighting of 4, making it second in importance only to the World Jiu-Jitsu Championship, which has a weighting of 7. The event serves as a crucial stepping stone for elite competitors preparing for the World Championship and is often the first major international IBJJF event of the calendar year.

== Notable Competitors ==
Over the years, numerous world champions and high-level competitors have participated in the European Championship. Some of the most notable athletes who have won titles at the Europeans include:

- Lúcio Rodrigues
- Roger Gracie
- Marcus "Buchecha" Almeida
- Leandro Lo
- Mikey Musumeci
- Gabi Garcia
- Micael Galvão
- Gabi Pessanha
- Tainan Dalpra

== Interesting Facts ==
The European Championship is known for being one of the largest IBJJF tournaments in terms of participation, often attracting thousands of competitors worldwide. Unlike the Pan Championship and the World Championship, which are held in the United States, the Europeans provide a major opportunity for athletes based outside North America to compete at an elite level. The event is open to all belt levels, from white to black belts, and includes divisions for juveniles, adults, and masters competitors.

== Past Locations ==
European IBJJF Jiu-Jitsu Championship Locations
Year	Location
2004–2020	Lisbon, Portugal
2021	Not held (COVID-19 pandemic)
2022	Rome, Italy
2023	Paris, France
2024	Paris, France
2025	Lisbon, Portugal

== Black belt male champions by year and weight ==
Year	Host	-57.5 kg Rooster	-64 kg Light Feather	-70 kg Feather	-76 kg Light	-82.3 kg Middle	-88.3 kg Medium Heavy	-94.3 kg Heavy	-100.5 kg Super Heavy	+100 kg Ultra Heavy	Absolute
2004	(Portugal)		(Brazil) Wellington Diaz (1/3)	(Brazil) Carlos Lemos (1/1)	(Brazil) Carlos Vieira (1/1)	(Brazil) João Felipe (fighter) (1/1)	(Brazil) Reinaldo Ramos (1/1)			(Brazil) Lucio Rodrigues (1/6)	(Brazil) Lucio Rodrigues (2/6)
2005	(Portugal)		(Brazil) Wellington Diaz (2/3)	(Brazil) Fredson Paixão (1/1)	(Brazil) Rodrigo Migliaccio (1/1)	(Brazil) Fabricio Camões (1/1)	(Brazil) Ronaldo Souza (1/1)	(Brazil) Lucio Rodrigues (3/6)	(Brazil) Roberto Abreu (1/1)	(Brazil) Roger Gracie (1/2)	(Brazil) Roger Gracie (2/2)
2006	(Portugal)		(Brazil) Augustin Clement (1/1)	(Brazil) Wellington Diaz (3/3)	(Brazil) Christian Uflacker (1/1)	(Brazil) Leonardo Pechanha (1/1)	(Brazil) Eduardo Rios (1/1)	(Brazil) Alessandro Nunes (jiu-jitsu) (1/1)		(Brazil) Victor Costa (jiu-jitsu) (1/1)	(Brazil) Mário Reis (fighter) (1/2)
2007	(Portugal)		(Brazil) Anderson Perriera(1/1)	(Brazil) Reinaldo Ribeiro (1/2)	(Brazil) Phillipe Della Monica (1/1)	(Brazil) Alan Nascimento (1/3)	(Brazil) Raphael Abi Rihan (1/1)	(Brazil) Braulio Estima (1/5)	(United States) Rafael Lovato Jr. (1/2)	(Brazil) Bruno Santos (1/1)	(Brazil) Braulio Estima (2/5)
2008	(Portugal)	(Brazil) Wekcilley Lima (1/1)	(Brazil) Felipe Costa (1/1)	(Brazil) Reinaldo Ribeiro (2/2)	(Brazil) Michel Maia (1/1)	(Brazil) Alan Nascimento (2/3)	(Brazil) Alexandre Souza (1/2)	(Brazil) Lima Junior (1/1)	(Brazil) Marcel Fortuna (1/1)	(Brazil) Luis Oliveira (jiu-jitsu) (1/1)	(Brazil) Alexandre Souza (2/2)
2009	(Portugal)		(Brazil) Pablo Santos (jiu-jitsu) (1/1)	(Brazil) Mário Reis (fighter)(2/2)	(Brazil) Michael Langhi (1/6)	(Brazil) Kron Gracie (1/1)	(Brazil) Alan Nascimento (3/3)	(Brazil) Braulio Estima (3/5)	(Brazil) Rodrigo Cavaca (1/2)	(Brazil) Marcio Cruz (1/1)	(Brazil) Braulio Estima (4/5)
2010	(Portugal)	(Brazil) Bruno Malfacine (1/1)	(Brazil) Guilherme Mendes (1/1)	(Brazil) Rafael Mendes (1/2)	(Brazil) Lucas Lepri (1/1)	(Brazil) Gustavo Campos (1/2)	(Brazil) Tarsis Humphreys (1/1)	(Brazil) Fabio Gurgel (1/1)	(Brazil) Ricardo Abreu (1/1)	(Brazil) Rodrigo Cavaca (2/3)	(Brazil) Gustavo Campos (2/2)
2011	(Portugal)		(Brazil) Ary Farias (1/1)	(Brazil) Eduardo Ramos (jiu-jitsu) (1/1)	(Brazil) Michael Langhi (2/6)	(Brazil) Claudio Calasans (1/3)	(Brazil) Braulio Estima (5/5)	(Brazil) Bernardo Faria (1/3)	(Brazil) Lucio Rodrigues (4/6)	(Brazil) Igor Silva (fighter) (1/2)	(Brazil) Sergio Moraes (1/1)
2012	(Portugal)	(Japan) Koji Shibamoto (1/2)	(Brazil) Carlos Holanda (1/1)	(Brazil) Bruno Frazzato (1/1)	(Japan) Roberto Satoshi (1/1)	(Brazil) Victor Estima (1/1)	(Brazil) Rodrigo Fajardo (1/2)	(Brazil) Rodolfo Vieira (1/1)	(Brazil) Bernardo Faria (2/3)	(Denmark) Alexander Trans (1/3)	(Brazil) Rodolfo Vieira (2/2)
2013	(Portugal)	(United States) Brandon Mullins (1/1)	(Brazil) Laercio Fernandes (1/1)	(Brazil) Rubens Charles (1/2)	(Brazil) Michael Langhi (3/6)	(Brazil) Claudio Calasans (2/3)	(Brazil) Romulo Barral (1/1)	(Brazil) Dimitrius Souza (1/1)	(Brazil) Bernardo Faria (3/3)	(Denmark) Alexander Trans (2/3)	(Brazil) Leo Nogueira (1/1)
2014	(Portugal)	(Brazil) Caio Terra (1/3)	(Brazil) Jose Barros (jiu-jitsu) (1/1)	(Brazil) Rafael Mendes (2/2)	(Brazil) Michael Langhi (4/6)	(Brazil) Claudio Calasans (3/3)	(Brazil) Tiago Silva (jiu-jitsu) (1/1)	(Brazil) Jackson Sousa (1/2)	(Brazil) Lucio Rodrigues (5/6)	(Brazil) Rodrigo Cavaca (3/3)	(Denmark) Alexander Trans (3/3)
2015	(Portugal)	(Brazil) Caio Terra (2/3)	(Brazil) João Miyao (1/3)	(Brazil) Marcio Andre Barbosa (1/4)	(Brazil) Michael Langhi (5/6)	(United States) Jonathan Torres (1/1)	(Brazil) André Galvão (1/2)	(Brazil) Erbeth Santos de Mesquita (1/2)	(Brazil) Lucio Rodrigues (6/6)	(Brazil) Ricardo Evangelista (2/2)	(Brazil) André Galvão (2/2)
2016	(Portugal)	(Brazil) Caio Terra (3/3)	(Brazil) João Miyao (2/3)	(Brazil) Marcio Andre Barbosa (2/4)	(United States) Michael Liera Jr. (1/1)	(Brazil) Yago Vinicius de Souza (1/1)	(Brazil) Gabriel Arges de Sousa (1/1)	(Brazil) Jackson Sousa (2/2)	(Brazil) Erbeth Santos de Mesquita (2/2)	(Brazil) Pedro Henrique de Souza Moura (1/1)	(Brazil) Felipe Pena (1/1)
2017	(Portugal)	(Japan) Koji Shibamoto (2/2)	(United States) Mikey Musumeci (1/2)	(Brazil) Rubens Charles (2/2)	(Brazil) Marcio Andre Barbosa. (3/4)	(Brazil) Marcos Tinoco (1/1)	(Brazil) Rodrigo Fajardo (2/2)	(Brazil) Leandro Lo (1/2)	(Brazil) Mahamed Aly (1/1)	(Brazil) Igor Silva (2/2)	(Brazil) Leandro Lo (2/2)
2018	(Portugal)	(Brazil) Hiago Gama (1/1)	(Brazil) Hiago George (1/2)	(Brazil) Marcio André Barbosa (2/2)	(Brazil) Michael Langhi (6/6)	(Brazil) Isaque Bahiense (1/2)	(Brazil) Horlando Monteiro (1/1)	(United States) Keenan Cornelius (1/2)	(Portugal) Manuel Pontes (1/1)	(Brazil) Ricardo Evangelista (2/2)	(Brazil) Lucas Barbosa (1/1)
2019	(Portugal)	(Brazil) Rodnei Barbosa (1/1)	(Brazil) João Miyao (3/3)	(Brazil) Paulo Miyao (1/1)	(Australia) Levi Jones-Leary (1/1)	(Brazil) Isaque Bahiense (2/2)	(Brazil) Rudson Mateus (1/1)	(Brazil) Kaynan Duarte (1/3)	(Brazil) Fellipe Andrew (1/5)	(Brazil) Victor Honório (1/1)	(Brazil) Gustavo Batista (1/1)
2020	(Portugal)	(Japan) Tomoyuki Hashimoto (1/1)	(United States) Mikey Musumeci (2/2)	(United States) Isaac Doederlein (1/1)	(Brazil) Jonnatas Gracie (1/1)	(Norway) Tommy Langaker (1/1)	(Brazil) Manuel Ribamar (1/1)	(United States) Keenan Cornelius (2/2)	(Brazil) Patrick Gaudio (1/1)	(Brazil) Igor Schneider (1/1)	(Brazil) Fellipe Andrew (2/5)
2022	(Italy)	(Brazil) Thalison Soares (1/3)	(Brazil) Hiago George (2/2)	(Brazil) Diego Sodré (1/1)	(Norway) Espen Mathiesen (1/1)	(Brazil) Tainan Dalpra (1/3)	(Portugal) Bruno Lima (1/1)	(Poland) Adam Wardzinski (1/3)	(Brazil) Fellipe Andrew (3/5)	(United States) Rafael Lovato Jr. (2/2)	(Brazil) Fellipe Andrew (4/5)
2023	(France)	(Brazil) Thalison Soares (2/3)	(United States) Malachi Edmond (1/1)	(Brazil) Fabricio Andrey (1/1)	(Brazil) Andy Murasaki (1/1)	(Brazil) Tainan Dalpra (2/3)	(Brazil) Jansen Gomes (1/1)	(Brazil) Fellipe Andrew (5/5)	(Brazil) Kaynan Duarte (2/3)	(United States) Mason Fowler (1/1)	(Brazil) Kaynan Duarte (3/3)
2024	(France)	(Brazil) Thalison Soares (3/3)	(Brazil) Meyram Alves (1/1)	(Brazil) Kennedy Maciel (1/1)	(United States) Elijah Dorsey (1/1)	(Brazil) Micael Galvão (1/1)	(Brazil) Maurício Oliveira (1/1)	(Poland) Adam Wardzinski (2/3)	(Brazil) Erich Munis (1/1)	(Brazil) Gutemberg Pereira (1/2)	(Brazil) Gutemberg Pereira (2/2)
2025	(Portugal)	(Brazil) Yuri Hendrex (1/1)	(Brazil) Diogo Reis (1/1)	(Brazil) Diego Oliveira (1/2)	(Brazil) Leonardo Oliveira (1/1)	(Brazil) Tainan Dalpra (3/4)	(Brazil) Davi Vetoraci (1/1)	(Poland) Adam Wardzinski (3/3)	(Brazil) Windson Torres (1/1)	(Brazil) Luis Cantareira (1/2)	(Brazil) Luis Cantareira (2/2)
2026	(Portugal)	(United States) Jalen Fornacier (1/1)	(Brazil) Diego Oliveira (2/2)	(Brazil) Kennedy Maciel(1/1)	(United States) Will Wilson (1/1)	(Brazil) Tainan Dalpra (4/4)	(Brazil) Eduardo Alves (1/1)	(Brazil) Leo Ferreira (1/1)	(Brazil) Vinicius Liberati (1/1)	(Morocco) Seif Eddine(1/1)	(Brazil) Gabriel Veloso (1/1)

== Black belt female champions by year and weight ==
Year	Host	-48 kg Rooster	-53 kg Light Feather	-58 kg Feather	-64 kg Light	-69 kg Middle	-74 kg Medium Heavy	-80 kg Heavy	+80 kg Super Heavy	Absolute
2004	(Portugal)				(Brazil) Mariana Coelho (1/1)	(Brazil) Carolina Prado (1/1)				
2005	(Portugal)			(Brazil) Leticia Ribeiro (1/1)						
2006	(Portugal)				(Brazil) Carmen Jahnke (1/1)	(Norway) Camilla Gjelsten (1/1)				
2007	(Portugal)				(Brazil) Luciana Dias (1/1)					
2009	(Portugal)			(Brazil) Virigina Macedo (1/1)		(Brazil) Monica Silva (1/2)				(Brazil) Monica Silva (2/2)
2010	(Portugal)		(Brazil) Gezary Matuda (1/2)	(Brazil) Angelica Ferreira (1/2)	(Brazil) Rosalinda Ferreira (4/7)	(Brazil) Beatriz Mesquita (1/4)				(Brazil) Beatriz Mesquita (2/4)
2011	(Portugal)		(Brazil) Oceane Talvard (1/1)	(Brazil) Marina Medeiros (1/1)	(Brazil) Luana Alzuguir (1/4)	(Sweden) Ida Hansson (1/3)		(Brazil) Gabrielle Garcia (1/4)		(Brazil) Gabrielle Garcia (2/4)
2012	(Portugal)		(Brazil) Angelica Ferreira (2/2)			(Sweden) Ida Hansson (2/3)	(Brazil) Michelle Nicolini (1/3)			(Brazil) Michelle Nicolini (2/3)
2013	(Portugal)		(Netherlands) Yasmin Sewgobind (1/1)	(United States) Mackenzie Dern (1/3)	(Brazil) Marina Ribeiro (1/1)	(Brazil) Luana Alzuguir (1/4)	(Brazil) Caroline de Lazzer (1/1)			(Brazil) Luana Alzuguir (2/4)
2014	(Portugal)				(France) Laurence Cousin(1/1)	(Brazil) Vanessa Oliveira (1/1)	(Brazil) Luana Alzuguir (3/4)			(Brazil) Luana Alzuguir (4/4)
2015	(Portugal)			(Brazil) Michelle Nicolini (3/3)	(Brazil) Angelica Galvao (1/1)	(Sweden) Janni Larsson (1/1)	(Sweden) Ida Hansson (3/3)	(Lithuania) Dominyka Obelenyte (1/1)	(Brazil) Gabrielle Garcia (3/4)	(Brazil) Gabrielle Garcia (4/4)
2016	(Portugal)		(United States) Kristina Barlaan (1/1)	(Brazil) Mackenzie Dern (2/3)	(Brazil) Jessica Cristina Santos (1/1)	(Brazil) Luiza Monteiro (1/3)	(Brazil) Andresa Correa (1/2)		(Brazil) Ewelyn Arruda (1/1)	(Brazil) Andresa Correa (2/2)
2017	(Portugal)	(Italy) Serena Gabrielli (1/2)	(Brazil) Gezary Matuda (2/2)	(Brazil) Mackenzie Dern (3/3)	(Brazil) Beatriz Mesquita (3/4)	(Brazil) Ana Carolina Vieira (1/1)	(Brazil) Nathiely de Jesus (1/3)	(Brazil) Claudia Doval (1/2)	(Brazil) Tayane Porfírio (1/4)	(Brazil) Tayane Porfírio (2/4)
2018	(Portugal)	(Italy) Serena Gabrielli (2/2)	(United Kingdom) Vanessa English (1/1)	(Brazil) Amanda Monteiro (1/1)	(Brazil) Beatriz Mesquita (4/4)	(Brazil) Danielle Alvarez (1/1)	(Brazil) Claudia Doval (2/2)	(Brazil) Carina Santi (1/2)	(Brazil) Tayane Porfírio (3/4)	(Brazil) Tayane Porfírio (4/4)
2019	(Portugal)	(Brazil) Mayssa Bastos (1/5)	(Belgium) Amal Amjahid (1/2)	(United Kingdom) Ffion Davies (1/3)	(Germany) Charlotte von Baumgarten (1/1)	(United Kingdom) Samantha Cook (1/1)	(Brazil) Luiza Monteiro (2/3)	(Brazil) Nathiely de Jesus (2/3)	(Brazil) Carina Santi (2/2)	(Brazil) Nathiely de Jesus (3/3)
2020	(Portugal)	(Brazil) Mayssa Bastos (2/5)	(Brazil) Ana Rodrigues (1/3)	(Belgium) Amal Amjahid (2/2)	(United Kingdom) Ffion Davies (2/3)	(Brazil) Thamara Silva (1/1)	(Brazil) Sabatha Dos Santos (1/1)	(United Kingdom) Laura Barker (1/1)	(Brazil) Jéssica Flowers (1/1)	(United Kingdom) Ffion Davies (3/3)
2022	(Italy)	(Brazil) Thaís Loureiro Felipe (1/2)	(Brazil) Mayssa Bastos (3/5)	(Brazil) Ana Rodrigues (2/3)	(Brazil) Nathalie Ribeiro (1/1)	(Brazil) Thalyta Silva (1/3)	(United States) Maggie Grindatti (1/1)		(Brazil) Gabrieli Pessanha (1/8)	(Brazil) Gabrieli Pessanha (2/8)
2023	(France)	(Brazil) Jessica Caroline Dantas (1/2)	(Brazil) Mayssa Bastos (4/5)	(Brazil) Ana Rodrigues (3/3)	(Brazil) Luiza Monteiro (3/3)	(Brazil) Thalyta Silva (2/3)	(Poland) Maria Malyjasiak (1/1)	Amanda de Oliveira (1/1)	(Brazil) Gabrieli Pessanha (3/8)	(Brazil) Gabrieli Pessanha (4/8)
2024	(France)	(United States) Shelby Murphey (1/1)	(Brazil) Jessica Caroline Dantas (2/2)	(Italy) Margot Ciccarelli (1/1)	(Brazil) Julia De Jesus Alves (1/1)	(Brazil) Thalyta Silva (3/3)	(France) Aurelie Le Vern (1/1)	(Brazil) Melissa Stricker Cueto (1/2)	(Brazil) Gabrieli Pessanha (5/8)	(Brazil) Gabrieli Pessanha (6/8)
2025	(Portugal)	(Brazil) Thaís Loureiro Felipe (2/2)	(Brazil) Mayssa Bastos (5/5)	(Brazil) Larissa Campos (1/1)	(Brazil) Janaina Lebre (1/1)	(United States) Vannessa Griffin (1/1)	(Brazil) Ingridd Alves (1/1)	(Brazil) Melissa Stricker Cueto (2/2)	(Brazil) Gabrieli Pessanha (7/8)	(Brazil) Gabrieli Pessanha (8/8)

== See also ==
- IBJJF
- Brazilian Jiu-Jitsu weight classes
- World IBJJF Jiu-Jitsu Championship
- World IBJJF Jiu-Jitsu No-Gi Championship
- European IBJJF Jiu-Jitsu No-Gi Championship
- Pan IBJJF Jiu-Jitsu Championship
- Pan IBJJF Jiu-Jitsu No-Gi Championship
- Brazilian National Jiu-Jitsu Championship
- Brazilian Nationals Jiu-Jitsu No-Gi Championship
- Asian IBJJF Jiu Jitsu Championship
