= Megaton Dias =

Brazilian Jiu-Jitsu practitioner and instructor

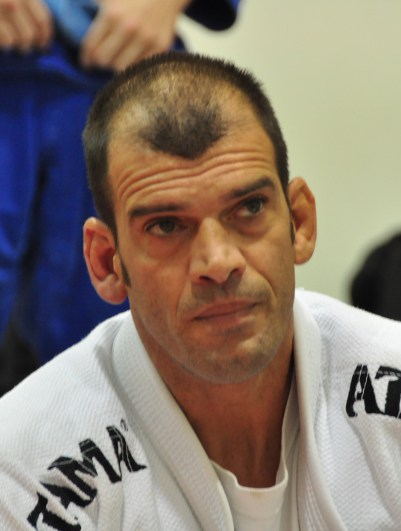
- Megaton Dias teaching a Gracie Jiu-Jitsu seminar in November 2011
- Born: Wellington Leal Dias Santos; October 2, 1967 (age 59); Rio de Janeiro, Brazil
- Style: Brazilian Jiu-Jitsu, Judo
- Teachers: Royler Gracie, Rickson Gracie, Helio Gracie
- Rank: 7th Degree Coral Belt in Brazilian Jiu-Jitsu in Gracie Jiu-Jitsu; 3rd Degree Black Belt in Judo

Other information
- Notable students: Kyle Watson, Mackenzie Dern, Evan Dunham
- Website: http://www.teammegaton.net/

Wellington Leal Dias Santos (born October 2, 1967), known as Megaton Dias, is a Brazilian Jiu-Jitsu (BJJ) practitioner and instructor. He holds a 7th-degree coral belt under the Gracie Humaitá lineage, led by Royler Gracie. Dias began his training in Rio de Janeiro, Brazil, and studied under Royler Gracie, Rickson Gracie, and Helio Gracie. He earned his BJJ black belt at the age of 18 and later achieved the coral belt rank.

Dias earned his nickname "Megaton" due to his judo-inspired techniques, particularly his ability to throw opponents high into the air. SubFighter named this the top-ranked nickname in mixed martial arts (MMA) in 2007.

== Early life and training ==
Dias began training in martial arts at a young age, initially focusing on judo before transitioning to Brazilian jiu-jitsu. He was influenced by the growing Gracie Jiu-Jitsu movement in Rio de Janeiro and trained under several renowned instructors, including Rogerio Camoes, before joining Gracie Humaitá under Royler Gracie.

=== Competitive longevity and legacy ===
Dias is notable for his remarkable longevity in competitive Brazilian jiu-jitsu. He has consistently competed at the highest levels across multiple generations, facing elite athletes spanning several decades. He has participated in every IBJJF Championship since 1996.

Dias has also competed in various international tournaments, including the ADCC Submission Wrestling World Championship.

=== Influence and teaching career ===
In addition to his competitive achievements, Dias has had a significant impact as an instructor. His Megaton Brazilian Jiu-Jitsu Academy in Phoenix, Arizona, has produced high-level black belts, including his daughter, Mackenzie Dern, who has become a top competitor in both BJJ and MMA.

Dias is widely respected for his aggressive and dynamic style, which has influenced many practitioners. He continues to conduct seminars worldwide, sharing his extensive knowledge and experience with students of all levels.

=== Recent achievements ===
Despite being in his fifties, Dias continues to compete at the highest levels. In 2024, he won double gold at the IBJJF Master World Championship, securing victories in both his weight division and the absolute category.

Dias remains an active competitor and coach, continuing to inspire both new and experienced Brazilian jiu-jitsu practitioners worldwide.

== Grappling career ==
Dias has established himself as a decorated competitor across multiple prestigious BJJ tournaments. His accolades include medals at the Pan-American Championship, European Championship, World Jiu-Jitsu Championship, U.S. National Championship, Rickson Gracie International Championship, and Rio de Janeiro State Championship. He is also a veteran of the ADCC Submission Wrestling World Championship, showcasing his versatility in submission grappling.

A standout achievement in Dias's career is his participation in every World Jiu-Jitsu Championship since its inception in 1996, making him the only competitor to achieve this feat. His longevity is further highlighted by his continued success in adult black belt divisions well into his 50s, including gold-medal victories against younger competitors as recently as 2023. In 2023, Dias made history at the IBJJF World Championship by becoming the first coral belt to compete in the lightweight division, further cementing his legacy.

=== Master career ===
As a master-level competitor, Dias has continued to dominate. On May 31, 2023, he competed at the IBJJF Master International - North America Championship, securing gold medals in both the Master 6 lightweight and absolute divisions. Later that year, on September 2, 2023, he won the Master 6 lightweight division at the IBJJF Master World Championship, reinforcing his status as a BJJ legend.

== Personal life ==
Dias lived in Phoenix, Arizona, with his family. His wife, Luciana, and daughter, Mackenzie Dern, are both BJJ black belts.

== See also ==
- Andre Galvao – Brazilian submission grappler and mixed martial arts fighter
- Gabi Pessanha – Brazilian jiu-jitsu grappler (born 2000)
- Gracie Barra – Brazilian jiu-jitsu academy and competition team
- Helio Gracie – Brazilian co-inventor of Brazilian jiu-jitsu (1913–2009)
- Paulo Miyao – Brazilian martial artist
- Tainan Dalpra – Brazilian jiu-jitsu practitioner
