= Melissa Cueto =

Brazilian jiu-jitsu competitor from brazil (born 1990)

- Born: 21 June 1990 (age 36); Pelotas, Brazil
- Other names: Melissa Stricker Cueto
- Division: Medium Heavy −74 kg Heavy −79.3 kg
- Fighting out of: Alliance San Diego
- Team: Alliance
- Rank: BJJ black belt (Note: Under Leonardo Morosetti)

Melissa Cueto (born 21 June 1990) is a Brazilian Jiu Jitsu (BJJ) black belt competitor from Brazil. Cueto is a two-time IBJJF jiu-jitsu world champion and the 2022 Pan Jiu-Jitsu Medium Heavy Champion.

== Early career ==
Melissa Cueto was born on 21 June 1990, in Pelotas, Brazil. During her early adolescence, Cueto practiced taekwondo for three years, then at the age of 17, her parents enrolled her in Brazilian jiu-jitsu (BJJ). Her first instructor was Antônio Pedro Dias (Kapincho), who awarded her all her belts from white to brown belt. After her relationship with Kapincho deteriorated she switched coach to Leonardo Morosetti of Thork Jiu-Jitsu.

Throughout her time as a purple belt, she became two-time South American champion, two-time Brazilian Champion, and earning two silver medals at the Brasileiros competition. Upon reaching the brown belt level, she won gold at both the Brasileiros and the World Championships, which led to her promotion to black belt in December 2018 under the guidance of her then-coach, Leonardo Morosetti. In 2019, she teamed up with Diego Unfer, a representative of the RMNU Association (Robson Moura Association) then in 2021, she joined Alliance Association, becoming a member of their team for international competitions.

== Black belt career ==
=== 2021-2022 ===
As a black belt, she won her first IBJJF World Championship title in 2021, winning silver competing at the World IBJJF No-Gi. the following year she dominated the heavyweight division at the 2022 Pan Jiu-Jitsu Championship where she won gold and bronze in the Openweight.

=== 2023 ===
In 2023 she became world champion for the second time winning the heavyweight and bronze in the openweight at the 2023 World Jiu-Jitsu Championship. Cueto was invited to compete in a women's heavyweight grand prix at BJJ Stars 11 on September 9, 2023. She submitted Tamiris Silva in the opening round but lost on points to the eventual winner, Gabi Pessanha, in the semifinal.

=== 2024 ===
Cueto won a gold medal in the heavyweight division and a bronze medal in the absolute division of the IBJJF European Championship on January 27, 2024.

Cueto competed in a four-woman openweight tournament at Arte Suave Elite 32 on February 26, 2024. She won her opening round match against Brittney Johnson by decision before losing to Thamara Ferreira by decision in the final.

Cueto then won a gold medal in the absolute division and a silver medal in the heavyweight division of the IBJJF Orange County Open on April 21, 2024.

Cueto won a bronze medal in the heavyweight division of the IBJJF World Championship 2024 on June 1, 2024. She then won a gold medal in the heavyweight division and a silver medal in the absolute division at the IBJJF American National Championship 2024 on June 28, 2024. She then also won the heavyweight and absolute divisions at the IBJJF Sacramento Fall Open on September 29, 2024.

Cueto then competed in the super-heavyweight division at the second edition of The Crown on November 17, 2024. She beat Isabely Lemos and Nathiely De Jesus, before losing to Gabi Pessanha in the final and finishing with a silver medal.

=== 2025 ===
Cueto won a gold medal in the heavyweight division and a bronze medal in the absolute division of the IBJJF European Championship 2025.
