= Mayara Custódio =

Mayara Custódio (born February 17, 1987, in Londrina, Paraná) is a Brazilian jiu-jitsu multi-time world champion from Brazil. She has trained at Gracie Barra and Checkmat International.

== Grappling career ==
Custodio won the 2021 World No Gi champion in the 65.5 kg division.

On September 23rd and 24th, 2023, Custodio competed at the IBJJF Kansas City Open 2023 and won the gi and no gi super-heavyweight, and absolute divisions.

Custodio then competed in the super-heavyweight division at the second edition of The Crown on November 17, 2024. She lost to Gabi Pessanha in the opening round.

== See also ==
- 2022 World Jiu-Jitsu Championship
- 2021 World Jiu-Jitsu Championship
- 2022 Pan Jiu-Jitsu Championship
