= Alexandre Paiva =

Brazilian Jiu-Jitsu practitioner

- Born: March 4, 1967 (age 59)
- Other names: “Gigi” (short for Genovesi)
- Nationality: Brazilian
- Team: Alliance Jiu Jitsu
- Teacher: Romero "Jacare" Cavalcanti
- Rank: Coral belt in Brazilian Jiu-Jitsu

Other information
- Notable students: Tayane Porfirio, Fernando Augusto
- Website: www.allianceriodejaneiro.com.br

Alexandre Paiva
Medal record

Representing Brazil

Brazilian Jiu-Jitsu

World Championship
Gold medal – first place	1999 Rio de Janeiro, Brazil	-82g

Pan American Championship
Gold medal – first place	1996 California, USA	-82kg

Alexandre "Gigi" Paiva (born March 4, 1967, Rio de Janeiro, Brazil) is a long standing figure, having been involved in Jiu Jitsu since the early 1980s, in the Brazilian jiu-jitsu community who has made a number of important contributions to the sport which are referenced below.

He began training when he was 15 years old in Romero "Jacare" Cavalcanti's school, where he was considered to be one of the academy's most technically gifted students, and received his Black Belt in 1993.

He won the World Jiu-Jitsu Championship 1x at Adult level and 4x at Masters level and, alongside Romero "Jacare" Cavalcanti and Fabio Gurgel, co-founded the Alliance Jiu Jitsu Team which has gone on to become the most successful competitive Brazilian Jiu-Jitsu team of all time.

The following athletes are included in the list of IBJJF World Champions he has trained - Fernando Augusto, Leo Leite, his son Victor Genovesi and Tayane Porfirio.

He is currently head coach at Alliance Jiu Jitsu Eagle Academy located in Eagle, Idaho USA.

== Instructor lineage ==
Mitsuyo "Count Koma" Maeda → Carlos Gracie, Sr. → Helio Gracie → Rolls Gracie → Romero "Jacare" Cavalcanti → Alexandre "Gigi" Paiva
