= Lucas Lepri =

Brazilian jiu-jitsu practitioner from Brazil

- Born: Lucas Alves Lepri; September 19, 1984 (age 42); Uberlândia, Minas Gerais, Brazil
- Division: Lightweight -76 kg (168 lb)
- Team: Alliance Jiu Jitsu; Top Team Academy; Elan Santiago
- Teachers: Elan Santiago; Fernando Terrere; Elan Santiago
- Rank: BJJ black belt (under Elan Santiago)

Other information
- Occupation: BJJ coach
- Website: https://lepribjjonline.com https://lepribjj.com

Lucas Alves Lepri (born September 19, 1984) is a Brazilian jiu-jitsu black belt practitioner.

A 9-time black belt IBJJF World Champion in both gi and no gi, Lepri has won every major jiu-jitsu tournament at black belt including the World Jiu-Jitsu Championship (Gi and No-Gi), Pan American Championship (Gi and No-Gi), European Championship and the Brazilian National Jiu-Jitsu Championship. Lepri is a member of the IBJJF Hall of Fame.

== Career ==
Lepri was born on September 19, 1984, in the state of Minas Gerais, Brazil. Lepri earned his black belt at the end of 2006 under Elan Santiago. After Santiago closed his academy Lepri moved to Top Team academy under Fernando Terere, after that academy also closed Lepri then joined Santiago at the Alliance team. In 2008 he moved to the US after being invited to coach at Alliance New York Academy.

He is currently based in Charlotte, North Carolina.

In 2017 Lucas Lepri launched his online academy with exclusive techniques and content for subscribers.

== Instructor lineage ==
Carlos Gracie > Carlson Gracie> Sergio Bolão > Mauro Chueng > Elan Santiago > Lucas Lepri
