= Kaline Medeiros =

Brazilian mixed martial artist (born 1979)

- Born: January 5, 1979 (age 47); João Pessoa, Paraíba, Brazil
- Other names: Dark Angel
- Height: 5 ft 3 in (1.60 m)
- Weight: 115 lb (52 kg; 8.2 st)
- Division: Strawweight

Mixed martial arts record
- Total: 15
- Wins: 9
- By knockout: 2
- By submission: 1
- By decision: 6
- Losses: 6
- By submission: 3
- By decision: 3

Other information
- Mixed martial arts record from Sherdog

Kaline Medeiros (born January 5, 1979) is a Brazilian mixed martial artist who competes in the Flyweight and Strawweight division. She has fought in Bellator and Invicta FC.

== Mixed martial arts record ==
Professional record breakdown
15 matches	9 wins	6 losses
By knockout	2	0
By submission	1	3
By decision	6	3
No contests	0	

Res.	Record	Opponent	Method	Event	Date	Round	Time	Location	Notes
Win	9–6	Jenna Serio	Decision (unanimous)	CES 49	April 6, 2018	3	5:00	Lincoln, Rhode Island	
Loss	8–6	Mackenzie Dern	Submission (armbar)	Invicta FC 26: Maia vs. Niedzwiedz	December 8, 2017	3	4:45	Kansas City, Missouri	
Loss	8–5	Angela Hill	Decision (unanimous)	Invicta FC 20: Evinger vs Kunitskaya	November 18, 2016	3	5:00	Kansas City, Missouri	For the Invicta FC Strawweight Championship.
Win	8–4	Manjit Kolekar	Decision (unanimous)	Invicta FC 19: Maia vs. Modafferi	September 23, 2016	3	5:00	Kansas City, Missouri	
Win	7–4	Aline Serio	TKO (punches)	Invicta FC 17: Evinger vs. Schneider	May 7, 2016	2	4:04	Costa Mesa, California	
Win	6–4	Kathina Catron	Decision (unanimous)	Legacy Fighting Championships 45	September 11, 2015	3	5:00	Tulsa, Oklahoma	
Win	5–4	Sarah Payant	Submission (kimura)	Bellator 140	July 17, 2015	1	3:24	Uncasville, Connecticut	
Win	4–4	Calie Cutler	Decision (unanimous)	NEF Fight Night 17	April 11, 2015	3	5:00	Lewiston, Maine	
Loss	3–4	Chel-c Bailey	Decision (unanimous)	Big John's MMA: Ogchidaa Spirit	February 21, 2015	3	5:00	Sault Ste Marie, Michigan	
Win	3–3	Brigitte Narcise	Decision (unanimous)	CES MMA 24	June 27, 2014	3	5:00	Lincoln, Rhode Island	
Win	2–3	Rachel Sazoff	Decision (unanimous)	CES MMA: Rise or Fall	October 4, 2013	3	5:00	Lincoln, Rhode Island	
Loss	1–3	Peggy Morgan	Decision (majority)	Reality Fighting: Mohegan Sun	June 2, 2012	3	5:00	Uncasville, Connecticut	
Win	1–2	Stephanie Eggink	KO (punch)	EB: Beatdown at 4 Bears 10	March 31, 2012	1	0:07	New Town, North Dakota	
Loss	0–2	Katie Merrill	Submission (armbar)	Victory Promotions: Clementi vs. Rogers	November 12, 2011	2	1:40	Lowell, Massachusetts	
Loss	0–1	Marianna Kheyfets	Submission (triangle choke)	Reality Fighting: Mohegan Sun	May 21, 2011	3	1:14	Uncasville, Connecticut	
