= Michael Langhi =

Brazilian Jiu-Jitsu practitioner

- Born: 2 April 1985 (age 40); Sao Carlos, Sao Paulo, Brazil
- Team: Alliance Jiu Jitsu
- Rank: 4th degree black belt in Brazilian Jiu-Jitsu

Michael Langhi
Medal record

Representing Brazil

Brazilian Jiu-Jitsu

World Championship
Gold medal – first place	2009 California, USA	-76kg
Gold medal – first place	2010 California, USA	-76kg
Gold medal – first place	2015 California, USA	-76kg

Pan American Championship
Gold medal – first place	2010 California, USA	-76kg
Gold medal – first place	2013 California, USA	-76kg

European Championship
Gold medal – first place	2009 Lisbon, Portugal	-76kg
Gold medal – first place	2011 Lisbon, Portugal	-76kg
Gold medal – first place	2013 Lisbon, Portugal	-76kg
Gold medal – first place	2014 Lisbon, Portugal	-76kg
Gold medal – first place	2015 Lisbon, Portugal	-76kg
Gold medal – first place	2018 Lisbon, Portugal	-76kg

Brazilian National Championship
Gold medal – first place	2008 Rio de Janeiro, Brazil	-76kg
Gold medal – first place	2009 Rio de Janeiro, Brazil	-76kg
Gold medal – first place	2016 Rio de Janeiro, Brazil	-76kg
Gold medal – first place	2017 Rio de Janeiro, Brazil	-76kg

World No Gi Championship
Gold medal – first place	2015 California, USA	-76kg

European Nogi Championship
Gold medal – first place	2012 London, England	-79.5kg

Brazilian Nationals Nogi Championship
Gold medal – first place	2009 Rio de Janeiro, Brazil	-76g

Michael Langhi (born 2 April 1985) is a Brazilian Jiu Jitsu (BJJ) World Championship Champion and World No-Gi Championship Champion. Langhi is one of a select group of fighters to have won all 4 major Gi Championships more than once – World Championship x3, European Open Championship x6, Pan Jiu-Jitsu Championship x2 and Brazilian Nationals Championship x4.

Langhi began training in 2002 under Rubens Charles at his academy in Sao Carlos. Prior to receiving his Black Belt Langhi was also a multiple World Champion at Blue, Purple and Brown Belt level. In 2009 Langhi was awarded the best Jiu Jitsu Competitor of the year award. Jiu Jitsu talent runs in the family as his brother Michel Langhi is also a multiple IBJJF World Champion.

Langhi retired from competition during the 2019 IBJJF World Championships.

He is the CEO at the 13x World Champions Alliance Jiu Jitsu Club in Sao Paulo where he teaches alongside 7th degree Red and Black Belt Mestre Fabio Gurgel and trains alongside numerous multiple world champions. He has also given seminars throughout Brazil and around the World in countries like Finland the UK and Croatia.
