= Alliance Jiu Jitsu =

Brazilian jiu-jitsu association

Alliance Jiu-Jitsu
- Date founded: 1993
- Country of origin: Brazil
- Founder: Romero "Jacare" Cavalcanti; Fabio Gurgel; Alexandre Paiva
- Current head: Romero "Jacare" Cavalcanti, Fabio Gurgel, Alexandre Paivas, Bruno Malfacine
- Arts taught: Brazilian jiu-jitsu Mixed martial arts
- Official website: alliancebjj.com

Alliance Jiu Jitsu
Medal record

Representing Brazil

IBJJF World Championship – Team Results
Gold medal – first place	2024 California, USA	Male Adult
Gold medal – first place	2022 California, USA	Male Adult
Gold medal – first place	2019 California, USA	Male Adult
Silver medal – second place	2021 California, USA	Male Adult
Gold medal – first place	2016 California, USA	Male Adult
Gold medal – first place	2015 California, USA	Male Adult
Gold medal – first place	2014 California, USA	Male Adult
Gold medal – first place	2013 California, USA	Male Adult
Gold medal – first place	2012 California, USA	Male Adult
Gold medal – first place	2011 California, USA	Male Adult
Gold medal – first place	2010 California, USA	Male Adult
Gold medal – first place	2009 California, USA	Male Adult
Gold medal – first place	2008 California, USA	Male Adult
Gold medal – first place	1999 Rio de Janeiro, Brazil	Male Adult
Gold medal – first place	1998 Rio de Janeiro, Brazil	Male Adult

World Master Jiu-Jitsu IBJJF Championship – Team Results
Gold medal – first place	2023 Las Vegas, USA	Male Master
Gold medal – first place	2022 Las Vegas, USA	Male Master

European Jiu-Jitsu IBJJF Championship – Team Results
Gold medal – first place	2013 Lisbon, Portugal	Male Adult
Gold medal – first place	2011 Lisbon, Portugal	Male Adult
Gold medal – first place	2010 Lisbon, Portugal	Male Adult

Brazilian National Jiu-Jitsu Championship – Team Results
Gold medal – first place	2011 São Paulo, Brazil	Male Adult
Gold medal – first place	2009 São Paulo, Brazil	Male Adult

Pan IBJJF Jiu-Jitsu Championship – Team Results
Gold medal – first place	2010 California, USA	Male Adult
Silver medal – second place	2021 Florida, USA	Male Adult
Bronze medal – third place	2023 Florida, USA	Male Adult

Alliance is a Brazilian jiu-jitsu association. Alliance was founded by Romero "Jacare" Cavalcanti and his students: Fabio Gurgel, Alexandre Paiva, and Fernando Gurgel. Alliance Global headquarters is in Atlanta, Georgia, at the Alliance Martial Arts Academy, where "Jacare" is the head instructor. Fabio Gurgel is the co-leader of Alliance and the head instructor at Alliance São Paulo (São Paulo, Brazil). Alexandre "Gigi" Paiva heads the third main Alliance academy in Rio de Janeiro, Brazil.

In 2010, Alliance won all major competitions: European Championship, Pan American Championship, and the World Jiu-Jitsu Championship; an accomplishment which has never been achieved by any other team in history.

== History ==
Alliance was founded in 1993, by Romero Jacaré Cavalcanti, Fabio Gurgel, Alexandre Paiva and Fernando Gurgel. During the 1980s, Romero "Jacaré" Cavalcanti and his black belt students Fabio Gurgel and Alexandre "Gigi" Paiva followed independent paths, each establishing their own Brazilian jiu-jitsu academies. Despite their separate journeys, their teams frequently competed against each other in tournaments, leading to internal rivalries stemming from their shared lineage.

In 1993, recognizing the potential for greater success through unity, the three practitioners founded the Alliance team, intending to combine their efforts and present a united front in national and international competitions.

As their individual academies grew and began to establish affiliates, a need arose for standardized instruction and organizational consistency. In 2014, the founders formalized the creation of the Alliance Association to unify their teaching methodology and implement administrative practices that had proven successful, particularly under Fabio Gurgel's leadership.

Alliance has expanded into a global association with over 300 affiliated academies across multiple continents. The team is widely recognized for its structured instructional system and competitive achievements, including 14 titles in the adult division of the IBJJF World Jiu-Jitsu Championship. Alliance has produced numerous notable athletes such as Sergio Moraes, Bruno Malfacine, Rubens "Cobrinha" Charles, Leonardo Leite, Leo Nogueira, Tarsis Humphreys, Bernardo Faria, Michael Langhi, Marcelo Garcia, Lucas Lepri, Daniela Genovesi, Gabi Garcia, Monique Elias, Fernando "Tererê" Augusto, and Andresa Corrêa.

== Competition results ==
- Fourteen times World champions - 1998, 1999, 2008, 2009, 2010, 2011, 2012, 2013, 2014, 2015, 2016, 2019, 2022, 2024
- Two Times World Master Champions - 2022, 2023
- National Brazilian champion in 2011
- National Brazilian champion in 2009
- Two times champion Rio Open in 2008 and 2009
- European champion 2010, 2011 and 2013

== Notable black belts ==
- Romero "Jacare" Cavalcanti - Founders - 8th Degree Red / White Coral Belt & one of six Rolls Gracie black belts & Head Coach of Alliance in Atlanta
- Fabio "General" Gurgel - Founder & 4x IBJJF World Heavyweight Champion - 7th Degree Black Belt & Head Coach of Alliance in São Paulo
- Alexandre "Gigi" Paiva - Founder - IBJJF World Champion - 7th Degree Black Belt & Head Coach of Alliance in Rio de Janeiro
- Fernando "Terere" Augusto - 2x IBJJF World Middleweight Champion
- Rubens "Cobrinha" Charles Maciel - 4x IBJJF World Featherweight Champion/2x No Gi World Champ - 3X ADCC Submission Wrestling World Championship Winner
- Marcelo "Marcelinho" Garcia - 5x IBJJF World Middleweight Champion - 4X ADCC Submission Wrestling World Championship Winner
- Gabrielle Garcia - MMA Fighter - 6x IBJJF World Winner - 4x World Nogi Brazilian Jiu-Jitsu Championship Winner - 3X ADCC Submission Wrestling World Championship Winner
- Nei Seda - Multiple IBJJF Tournaments Medalist and Alexandre "Gigi" Paiva first Black Belt - 6th Degree Black Belt & Head Coach of Alliance Coral Springs - FL - Winner
- Sergio "Serginho" Moraes - UFC Fighter and 2x IBJJF World Champion
- Felipe "Zicró" Neto - 2x Rio de Janeiro State Champion, Florida State Champion
- Luana Alzuguir 5x IBJJF World 1x ADCC Submission Wrestling World Championship Winner
- Rodrigo Damm - Ex UFC Fighter and Ultimate Fighter Brasil participant
- Tarsis Humphreys - 1x IBJJF World Medium/Heavy Champion
- Andresa Correa - 3x IBJJF World Winner - 3x World Nogi Brazilian Jiu-Jitsu Championship Winner
- Lucas Lepri - 6x IBJJF World Lightweight Champion/3x World Nogi Brazilian Jiu-Jitsu Championship Winner
- Mário Reis - 2x IBJJF World Featherweight Champion
- Michael Langhi - 3X IBJJF World Winner 1x World Nogi Brazilian Jiu-Jitsu Championship Winner
- Monique Elias 1x IBJJF World Winner
- Dominyka Obelenyte - 4x IBJJF World Winner
- Bruno Malfacine - 10x IBJJF World Roosterweight Champion
- Demian Maia - UFC Fighter, 2x UFC Title Challenger, 5X IBJJF World Winner and 1X ADCC Submission Wrestling World Championship Winner
- Bernardo Faria - 4x IBJJF World Champion
- Leo Nogueira - 3x IBJJF World Winner / Bronze ADCC Submission Wrestling World Championship Champion
- Polyana Lago Barbosa - 3x IBJJF World Middleweight Champion
- Tayane Porfírio - First Female "Grand Slam" black belt champion, 4x IBJJF World Winner
- Isaque Bahiense - 1x IBJJF World Winner, 1x IBJJF Europeans Winner
- Nicholas Meregali - 1x IBJJF World Winner, 1x Brazilian National Championship Winner
- Dimitrius Souza - 3x Brazilian National Championship Winner, 1x European Championship (Brazilian jiu-jitsu) Winner
- Fernando Di Piero “Soluço” - Multiple-time international medalist
- Matias Simonelli Multiple IBJJF Event Medallist and first Argentinian Black Belt under Mestre Fabio Gurgel
- Leo Leite
- Vicente Cavalcanti- Asian Open champion, Rome Open champion, 3x Pan Pacific champion, 3x Australian champion.
- Andre Cury IBJJF Medallist-1st degree BJJ Black Belt under Luciano ( Casquinha ) Nucci one of the most remarkable BJJ black belt in Brazil
- Paulo Sergio Silva Dos Santos - 6th Degree BJJ Black belt, 2nd degree Judo blackbelt, 6x IBJJF World champion, 5x Brazilian National Championship Winner, 5x IBJJF Europeans winner
- Allen Mohler-5th degree BJJ Black Belt
- Paul Walker - awarded posthumously by Ricardo "Franjinha" Miller at Paragon Jiu-Jitsu.
- Alexandre Barros ( Xandão )-5th degree BJJ Black Belt

== Official Alliance Affiliates ==
Alliance BJJ Houston is an official affiliate located in Houston, Texas, offering training programs for adults and children under the Alliance Jiu-Jitsu association.

Alliance Jiu-Jitsu Keller is an official affiliate located in Keller, Texas, offering training programs for adults and children under the Alliance Jiu-Jitsu association.

== See also ==
- Gracie Barra
- Atos Jiu-Jitsu
- Checkmat
