= Bernardo Faria =

Brazilian martial artist

- Born: 20 January 1987 (age 39); Juiz de Fora, Minas Gerais, Brazil
- Team: Alliance Jiu Jitsu
- Rank: Black belt in Brazilian jiu-jitsu

Bernardo Augusto Rocha de Faria is a Brazilian submission grappler and instructor. He is multi-time IBJJF World Jiu-Jitsu Champion, European Champion, Pan-American Champion and Brazilian National Champion. In February and March 2013, Faria was ranked first in the IBJJF World Ranking of all divisions, and was chosen as the best jiu-jitsu athlete of 2015. Faria received his black belt from instructor Ricardo Marques in 2008, and moved to the Alliance Jiu Jitsu Sao Paulo team to train with Fábio Gurgel in 2009. In June 2022, Faria was inducted in the IBJJF Hall of Fame.

Bernardo Faria currently runs his own jiu-jitsu academy in Bedford, Massachusetts. He is a member of Alliance Jiu Jitsu team and Marcelo Garcia Association.

Faria is the co-founder of BJJ Fanatics, an online platform that provides educational content for grapplers.

== See also ==
- Erberth Santos
