= Maria Malyjasiak =

Brazilian jiu-jitsu practitioner from Poland (born 1989)

- Born: 2 March 1989 (age 37); Gdańsk, Poland
- Nickname: Marysia
- Division: Gi weight classes; Heavyweight; −79.3 kg (174.8 lb); Medium Heavyweight; −74 kg (163.1 lb)
- Team: Abmar Barbosa JJ Association; Zenith BJJ
- Trainer: Abmar Barbosa
- Rank: BJJ black belt (Note: under Abmar Barbosa)

Other information
- Occupation: BJJ instructor
- Website: Grumpy BJJ Girl

Maria Malyjasiak is a Polish Judoka, submission grappler and Brazilian jiu-jitsu (BJJ) black belt competitor.

A former Poland National Judo Team and Poland National Grappling Team member, Malyjasiak is a BJJ black belt Pan-American (gi and no-gi) Champion, European Open Champion and a World IBJJF and ADCC Submission Fighting World Championship medallist. Malyjasiak is ranked No. 4 in the heavyweight 2022-2023 IBJJF Gi Ranking.

== Career ==
Maria Malyjasiak was born on 2 March 1989 in Gdańsk, Poland. In 2002 she started learning Judo while at school, her training took her to the Poland National Judo Team and Poland National Grappling Team, ultimately competing for the Judo team as a U17 and U20 athlete. In 2011 she won a Brazilian jiu-jitsu (BJJ) tournament, the UAEJJF Abu Dhabi Pro Trials, with only two months of training. Malyjasiak then left Judo to focus on BJJ. In 2013 while competing in the US she met BJJ black belt Abmar Barbosa with who she started training, receiving both brown and black belts from him. She was promoted to black belt in 2017.

=== Black belt career ===
==== 2020−2022 ====
Malyjasiak competed at Fight 2 Win 154 on October 17, 2020 and won the promotion's welterweight gi title by defeating Nathiely de Jesus. She returned to the promotion at Fight 2 Win 165 on February 27, 2021 to defend her title against Elisabeth Clay in the main event. Malyjasiak was submitted with a kneebar and lost the belt. Malyjasiak returned against ADCC world champion Hannette Staack at Fight 2 Win 168 on March 27, 2021 and defeated her by decision. She then fought Kendall Reusing in the co-main event of Fight 2 Win 177 on July 18, 2021 and won the match by submission.

==== 2023 ====
Malyjasiak competed in the IBJJF European Championship 2023 where she won gold at medium-heavyweight and a bronze medal in the absolute division. On March 26, 2023 she competed in the IBJJF Pan Championship 2023 and won a bronze medal in the absolute division. Malyjasiak then competed in the Campeonato Brasileiro de Jiu-Jitsu on May 7, 2023 and won gold in the medium-heavyweight division.

Malyjasiak competed in the 2023 World Jiu-Jitsu Championship on June 3 and 4, winning a silver medal at medium-heavyweight. Malyjasiak competed at the IBJJF Master World Championship on September 2, 2023, where she won the master 1 heavyweight division. She then competed at the IBJJF No-Gi World Championship 2023, where she won bronze medals in both the heavyweight and absolute divisions.

Malyjasiak was ranked No. 4 in the heavyweight 2022-2023 IBJJF Gi Ranking and No. 9 in the overall Gi Ranking.

==== 2024-2025 ====
Malyjasiak won a bronze medal in the medium-heavyweight division of the IBJJF European Championship on January 27, 2024.

Malyjasiak competed in the Over 65 kg division of the ADCC European, Middle-Eastern, and African Trials 2024. She won a bronze medal.

Malyjasiak won a bronze medal in the absolute division of the IBJJF World Championship 2024 on June 1, 2024.

She then won a silver medal in the heavyweight division of the IBJJF Pan Championship 2025 and a bronze medal in the absolute division.

== Championships and accomplishments ==
Main Achievements (as black belt):

- IBJJF Pan Champion (2018 / 2022)
- IBJJF Pan No-Gi Champion (2018 (Note: Weight and absolute) / 2021)
- IBJJF European Open Champion (2023)
- F2W Middleweight Champion (2021)
- F2W Welterweight Champion (2020)
- 2nd place IBJJF World Championship (2018)
- 2nd place IBJJF World No-Gi Championship (2018 / 2021)
- 2nd place ADCC World Championship +60 kg (2013)
- 2nd place UAEJJF grand Slam Miami (2020)
- 3rd place IBJJF World Championship (2021)
- 3rd place IBJJF World No-Gi Championship (2017 / 2021 (Note: Absolute))
- 3rd place IBJJF World Championship (2023)
- 3rd place IBJJF Pan No-Gi Championship (2021)
- 3rd place UAEJJF NA Continental Pro Championship (2018)

Main Achievements (in coloured Belts):

- IBJJF Pan Champion (2015 brown)
- IBJJF World No-Gi Champion (2016 brown, 2013 purple)
- IBJJF European Open Champion (2012 blue)
- 2nd place IBJJF World Championship (2017/2015/2014 brown)
- 2nd place IBJJF World Championship No-Gi (2016 brown)
- 3rd place IBJJF Pans Championship (2017 brown, 2014 purple)
- 3rd place IBJJF World Championship (2015 brown)
- 3rd place IBJJF European Championship (2012 blue)

Main Achievements (in Judo):

- U20 Poland National Championship Champion (2007)
- U20 International A class Champion (2007)
- U17 Poland National Judo Champion (2005)
- 5th place Olympic Hopes U17 International (2005)

== Instructor lineage ==
Carlos Gracie > Helio Gracie > Rolls Gracie > Romero Cavalcanti > Leo Vieira > Robert Drysdale > Abmar Barbosa > Maria Malyjasiak
