= Lúcio Rodrigues =

Brazilian Brazilian jiu-jitsu practitioner

Lucio Rodrigues
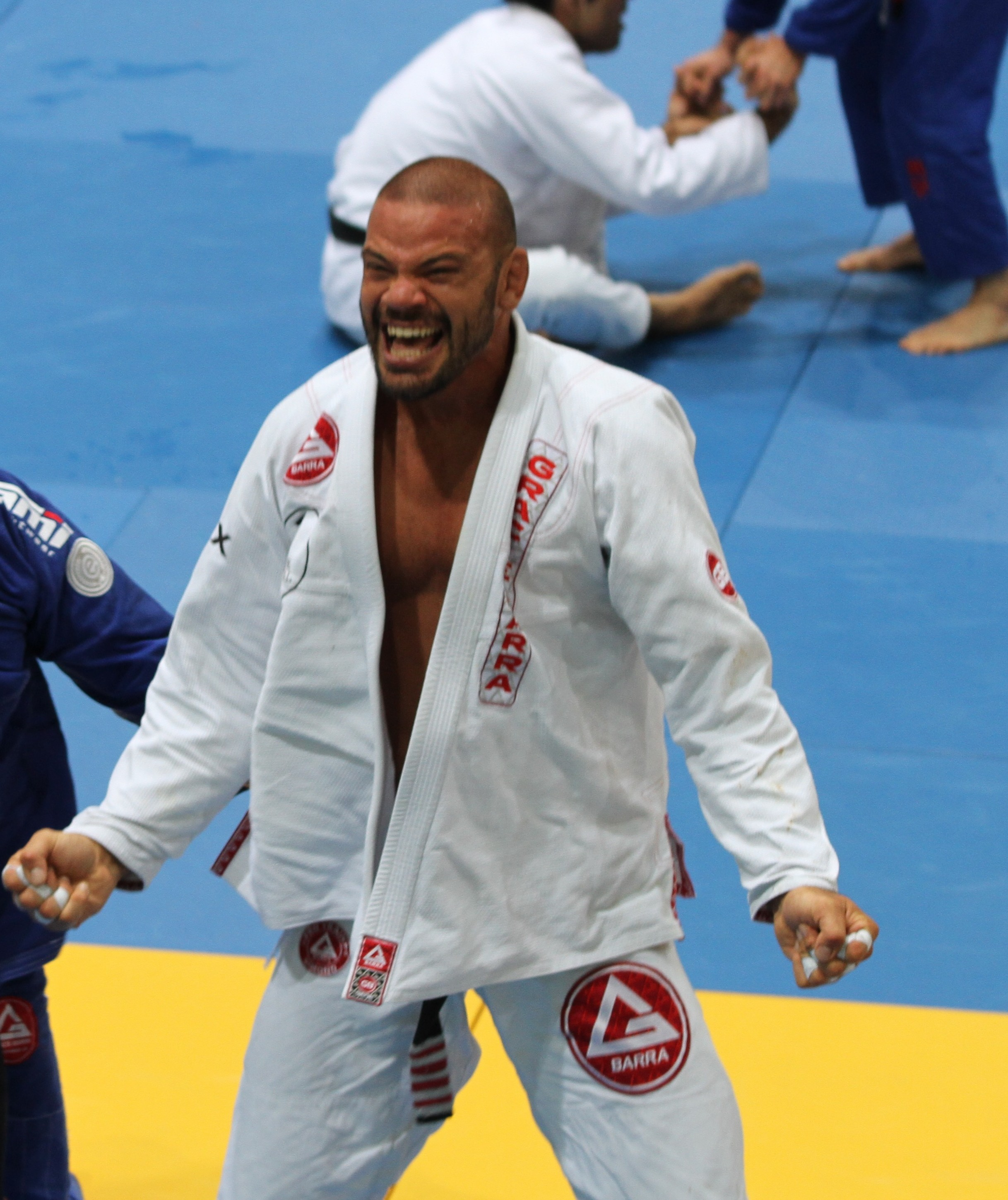
- Rodrigues at the IBJJF European championship

Personal information
- Nickname: "Lagarto"
- Born: October 26, 1980 (age 45) Rio de Janeiro, Brazil
- Height: 6 ft 4 in (193 cm)
- Weight: 220 lb (100 kg)
- Website: gbfulham.co.uk

Sport
- Sport: Brazilian Jiu-Jitsu
- Weight class: Super Heavyweight
- Updated on 3 February 2016

Lucio Rodrigues (born October 26, 1980), aka "Lagarto" (lizard in Portuguese), regarded as the IBJJF Europeans King, is a 3rd degree Black Belt in Brazilian Jiu-Jitsu. He is also a fighter (MMA and BJJ) and a teacher. He currently lives and coach in London, UK. Lucio was nicknamed "Lagarto" by Marcio Feitosa, as a joke due to Lucio's resemblance to the reptile. People now use it as a comparison with his abilities on the mat and his regeneration capacities after his cancer.

== Early life ==
Rodrigues was born in Rio de Janeiro. His life as Martial Artist started very early, at the age of 5, where he started training with Anselmo Rodrigues(his father). He then joined the Carlos Augusto's ( 4th degree black belt under Reyson Gracie) academy at the age of 13 where he focused completely on training hard.

At the age of 17 years, after receiving his blue belt, Lagarto opened his own academy with a friend and then moved to the Gracie Barra Academy in Barra da Tijuca to train with Carlos Gracie, Jr. Rodrigues received all his belts, from purple to black, from Carlos Gracie, Jr.. In 2004, after receiving his black belt at the age of 24, Carlos Gracie, Jr. asked Rodrigues to move to Portugal to promote BJJ in Europe.

After a period of 6 months Rodrigues moved back to Brazil, where he had his first experience as a MMA fighter in Top Fighter MMA. He won his fight against Roberto Albuquerque in the 1st round by submission (armbar).

== Overcoming cancer ==
In 2007, Rodrigues was diagnosed with Hodgkin's lymphoma, a cancer of the lymphatic system at only 27 years old. He had to undergo a tough chemotherapeutic treatment and doctors told him he would never be able to train or compete again. Despite the doctors opinion, and just a month after the start of his treatment, Rodrigues restarted both training and teaching. Rodrigues believes that his healthy lifestyle (no drinks, no drugs, no cigarettes or red meat and plenty of rest) has helped him endured the chemotherapy.

In 2008, after the end of his treatment, Rodrigues restarted the competition. He successfully competed in both the Rio de Janeiro State Championship and the Jordan Capital Challenge. It is only after winning Gold in both these competitions that Rodrigues revealed to everyone that he had cancer. According to one of his student, Simon McGovern (one of the few who knew about Lagarto's disease), Rodrigues made them promise to never talk about his cancer to anyone because he did not want to have any sympathy from other competitors.

== New life in the UK ==
In 2006, Rodrigues gave a seminar in England where he met John Paul Hartley(Bjj Head teacher), who invited him to come and teach in his school. Rodrigues and John Paul then created the Gracie Barra Preston Academy.

Rodrigues have now opened numerous Gracie Barra Academies (Gracie Barra Preston; Gracie Barra Glasgow; Gracie Barra Knightsbridge and recently Gracie Barra Fulham) with the objective of preparing students to become future instructors to open their own school or become Gracie Barra affiliates.

== Achievements ==
2018

- World Pro Cup: Silver

2017

- IBJJF Europeans: Silver (superheavy division)

2016

- IBJJF Europeans: Silver (superheavy division)
- IBJJF Europeans NoGi: Gold (absolute division) and Silver (superheavy division, closing the division with his student Arya Esfandmaz)

2015

- IBJJF Europeans: Gold (superheavy division) and Bronze (absolute division)

2014

- IBJJF Europeans: Gold (weight division)and Bronze (absolute division)

2013

- Amsterdam Grapplers Quest: Gold No-Gi (absolute division)
- IBJJF Europeans: Silver (superheavy division)

2012

- IBJJF Europeans: Silver (weight division)and Bronze Medal (absolute division)

2011

- AJP World Pro Cup: Gold
- AJP World Pro Cup Lisbon Trials: Gold (absolute weight and absolute division)
- IBJJF Europeans: Gold (superheavy division)

2009

- IBJJF Europeans: Silver

2008

- Rio de Janeiro State: Champion (weight & absolute division)
- Jordan Capital Challenge: Champion
- AJP World Pro Cup: Bronze (absolute division)

2007

- IBJJF Europeans: Silver and Bronze (absolute division )

2005

- IBJJF Europeans: Gold and Bronze (absolute division)
- IBJJF World Championship: Bronze
- IBJJF Brazilian National: Silver (absolute division)

2004

- IBJJF Europeans: Champion (weight & absolute division)
- IBJJF World Championship: Bronze

2003

- IBJJF World Championship: Silver and bronze(as brown belt)

2002

- IBJJF Brazilian National: Champion (as a brown belt)
- IBJJF World Championship: Gold Medalist (as purple belt, absolute division) and Bronze
