= Paulo Miyao =

Brazilian martial artist

- Born: May 11, 1991 (age 34); Andirá, Paraná
- Other names: xino
- Nationality: Brazilian
- Division: Super featherweight Featherweight
- Style: Brazilian Jiu Jitsu
- Rank: Black belt in Brazilian Jiu Jitsu under Cicero Costha

Paulo Miyao
Medal record

Submission Wrestling

ADCC South American Championships
Gold medal – first place	2017 Rio de Janeiro	-66kg

Brazilian Jiu-Jitsu

World Jiu-Jitsu Championship
Gold medal – first place	2015	Super-featherweight (black)
Silver medal – second place	2014	Super-featherweight (black)
Gold medal – first place	2013	Super-featherweight (brown)
Gold medal – first place	2013	Absolute (brown)
Gold medal – first place	2012	Super-featherweight (purple)
Silver medal – second place	2012	Absolute (purple)

Pan-American Championship
Gold medal – first place	2014	Super-featherweight (black)
Gold medal – first place	2013	Super-featherweight (brown)
Silver medal – second place	2013	Absolute (brown)
Gold medal – first place	2012	Super-featherweight (purple)
Bronze medal – third place	2012	Absolute (purple)

European Open Championships
Gold medal – first place	2013	Featherweight (brown)
Bronze medal – third place	2013	Absolute (brown)

Brazilian National Jiu-Jitsu Championship
Gold medal – first place	2013	Featherweight (brown)
Gold medal – first place	2013	Absolute (brown)
Silver medal – second place	2012	Super-featherweight (purple)
Gold medal – first place	2011	Super-featherweight (purple)

Paulo Henrique Bordignon Miyao (born May 11, 1991) is a Brazilian BJJ black belt with a notable competitive record. He and his brother João Miyao have a competitive rivalry with Keenan Cornelius: after several defeats to Cornelius in 2012, Paulo would go on to defeat Keenan at the 2013 World Jiu-Jitsu Championship in the brown belt absolute division, a remarkable feat for his given weight-class. Paulo trains under Cicero Costha alongside his brother João and the pair previously trained alongside world champion Leandro Lo.

== Black belt career ==
In 2012, Paulo won his first black belt tournament while still a brown belt at the ADCC tryouts in Natal, Brazil. He and his brother were promoted to black belt on June 25, 2013.

Paulo was invited to a submission-only, no-gi, super-fight match against UFC veteran Jon Fitch at the 2013 World Jiu-Jitsu Expo. Although Paulo was able to keep Fitch on the defensive for the majority of the 20-minute round, the match ended in a draw. Miyao competed against Geo Martinez at Who's Number One on October 2, 2020, and lost a split decision.

Miyao returned to competition against Lucas Pinheiro in the main event of Fight 2 Win 173 on June 11, 2021, winning a unanimous decision. Later that year he shared the final of the IBJJF Pan Championship in the master's division with his brother João, taking home the silver medal. He then fought in the main event of Polaris 18 on November 17, 2021, against Ashley Williams, losing a split decision.

Miyao returned to competition in 2022 when he was invited to compete in a superfight against Alexandre Vieira at BJJ Stars 9 on October 21, 2022. He submitted Vieira with a heelhook early in the match.

Miyao competed at the IBJJF Master World Championship on September 2, 2023, where he won a silver medal in the master 1 light-featherweight division.

Miyao competed against Pablo Mantovani at Pit Submission Series 8 on October 11, 2024. He won the match by decision.

Miyao competed against Junior Righetti in the main event of ADXC 7 on November 17, 2024. He won the match by decision.

== Coaching career ==
Miyao decided to slow down his competitive career in 2021 and pour more timing into coaching other competitors instead. He then became the head coach for Dream Art Jiu-Jitsu in July, 2022. After a few months working with that team Miyao announced in March, 2023 that he would be opening his own academy, Studio 1908, with his brother João.

== Doping ==
Paulo Miyao tested positive for clomiphene, a Specified Substance in the class of Hormone and Metabolic Modulators on the WADA Prohibited List and prohibited at all times under the World Anti-Doping Code and the USADA Protocol, which applied to the 2016 IBJJF World Jiu-Jitsu Championship. Miyao had challenged the validity of the test via an arbitrator, leading to an extensive process that could have negated the positive result. The crux of Miyao's argument was centered on the fact that the IBJJF has two waiver forms as part of the registration for Worlds, one in English and another in Portuguese. His claim was that as a non-native English speaker who used the Portuguese waiver, he was not aware of the anti-doping rules and therefore not subject to USADA jurisdiction. The USADA doping sanction has resulted in Miyao being suspended from WADA Code Signatory events for a period of two years, with the period of ineligibility beginning on September 29, 2016.

Miyao forfeited his gold medal from the IBJJF 2016 World Championships. He was eligible to compete in WADA Code Signatory events effective September 2018.
