= Tayane Porfírio =

Brazilian jiu-jitsu practitioner from Brazil

Tayane Porfirio
- Born: 11 December 1994 (age 31); Sobral, Ceará, Ceará, Brazil
- Division: super-heavyweight 79.3 kilograms (175 lb)
- Team: Gracie Barra; Alliance
- Rank: BJJ black belt

Other information
- Occupation: BJJ instructor

Tayane Porfírio de Araújo (born 11 December 1994 in Sobral, Ceará, Brazil) is a Brazilian Jiu Jitsu (BJJ) 4x World Championship black belt champion. In 2017 Porfirio realized the IBJJF Grand Slam after winning her weight category and the absolute category at all 4 major Gi Championships: World Championship, European Open Championship, Pan Jiu-Jitsu Championship and Brazilian Nationals Championship.

== Career ==
Tayane Porfírio de Araújo was born on 11 December 1994 in Sobral, Ceará, Brazil. She began training in 2010 at Mestre Márcio Rodrigues academy. In 2014 she moved to train with Mestre Alexandre Paiva at Alliance Jiu Jitsu in Rio de Janeiro. She started 2018 winning the 2018 European Open Championship in both her weight category and the absolute category. Porfirio missed the 2018 Pan Ams but came back after a slight injury to win her category and the absolute at the 2018 Brazilian Nationals. Porfírio then won her category and the absolute at the 2018 World Championships. (Note: Disqualified from those results see Doping ban) Porfirio ended 2018 as the number one black belt female competitor in the International Brazilian Jiu-Jitsu Federation rankings.

In October 2019 Porfirio won a bronze medal at the 2019 ADCC Submission Wrestling World Championship. In 2019 Porfirio announced leaving team Alliance In Brazil, with whom she had been since blue belt, to join Gracie Barra In The UK. Porfirio also competed at BJJ Bet 2 on 1 August 2021, where she defeated Gabrieli Pessanha 2-0 on points.

=== Doping ban ===
In May 2019, Porfirio received a four-year competition ban from the USADA (United States Anti-Doping Agency) after she tested positive for Nandrolone, a prohibited substance found in samples, collected on 3 June 2018, during the 2018 IBJJF World Jiu-Jitsu Championship. Porfirio’s four-year period of ineligibility began on 22 June 2018, in addition, Porfirio has been disqualified from all competitive results subsequent to 30 May 2018. Porfirio accepted the sanction while maintaining her innocence and the innocence of her team.

=== 2023 ===
Porfirio returned to IBJJF competition for the first time since being suspended in 2018 at the London Open on 19 February 2023, where she won the absolute division after submitting all her opponents, and default gold (Note: Single competitor in that weight class) in the super heavyweight division. She then competed at the ADCC UK National Championships on 12 August 2023, where she won a gold medal in the over 70 kg division.

Porfirio was invited to compete in a women's heavyweight grand prix at BJJ Stars 11 on 9 September 2023. She won her first match against Welma Moreira but lost in the semi-final to Yara Soares.

Porfirio competed against Giovanna Jara in a superfight at ADXC 1 on 20 October 2023. She won the match by unanimous decision.

Porfirio replaced Nathiely de Jesus in the super-heavyweight division of The Crown on 19 November 2023. She won a silver medal in the division, losing to Gabi Pessanha in the final. Porfirio then won the under 95 kg division of the Mother of the Nation Jiu-Jitsu Cup 2023 on 17 December 2023.

=== 2024 - 2025 ===
Porfirio won a gold medal in the super-heavyweight division of the Abu Dhabi Grand Slam Tokyo on 14 January 2024. She then won a silver medal in the super-heavyweight division of the IBJJF European Championship on 27 January 2024. Porfirio won a gold medal in the absolute division and a silver medal at super-heavyweight in the IBJJF Jiu-Jitsu Con No Gi International Championship 2024 on 30 August 2024. She then won the master 1 super-heavyweight division of the IBJJF Master World Championship 2024 on 31 August 2024.

Porfirio then announced that she was leaving Gracie Barra to return to Alliance Jiu Jitsu. In her first appearance since the change, she faced Giovanna Jara at BJJ Stars 14 on 7 December 2024. Porfirio won the match on points.

Porfirio then challenged Gabi Pessanha for the absolute title at BJJ Stars 15 on April 26, 2025. She lost the match by submission.

== Brazilian Jiu-Jitsu competitive summary ==
Main Achievements at black belt level:

- ~~IBJJF World champion (2018 (Note: Weight and absolute))~~ (disqualified)
- IBJJF World Championship (2017)
- IBJJF European Open (2018) / 2017))
- IBJJF Pan American Championship (2017)
- CBJJ Brazilian Nationals (2018) / 2017))

Main Achievements (Coloured Belts):

- IBJJF World Championship (2015) purple, 2016 brown)
- UAEJJF Abu Dhabi World Pro (2016) brown)
- IBJJF Pan American (2017, 2015) purple)
- IBJJF European Open (2015) purple, 2016) brown)
- CBJJ Brazilian Nationals (2014)/2015) purple)
- UAEJJF Grand Slam – London (2016) brown)
- UAEJJF Grand Slam – Rio de Janeiro (2016) brown)
- 3rd Place IBJJF World Championship (2016 (Note: Absolute)) brown)

== Instructor lineage ==
Mitsuyo Maeda > Carlos Gracie > Helio Gracie > Rolls Gracie > Romero Cavalcanti > Alexandre Paiva > Tayane Porfirio
