= Andresa Correa =

Brazilian Jiu Jitsu

- Born: 19 April 1980 (age 46)
- Nationality: Brazilian
- Team: Alliance Jiu Jitsu
- Rank: Black belt in Brazilian Jiu-Jitsu

Andresa Correa
Medal record

Representing Brazil

Brazilian Jiu-Jitsu

World Championship
Gold medal – first place	2013 California, USA	+74kg
Gold medal – first place	2014 California, USA	+74kg
Gold medal – first place	2016 California, USA	+74kg

Pan American Championship
Gold medal – first place	2016 California, USA	Absolute
Gold medal – first place	2016 California, USA	+74kg

European Championship
Gold medal – first place	2016 Lisbon, Portugal	Absolute
Gold medal – first place	2016 Lisbon, Portugal	+74kg

Brazilian National Championship
Gold medal – first place	2014 Rio de Janeiro, Brazil	+80kg
Gold medal – first place	2015 Rio de Janeiro, Brazil	+74kg
Gold medal – first place	2016 Rio de Janeiro, Brazil	Absolute
Gold medal – first place	2016 Rio de Janeiro, Brazil	+74kg

Worlds Nogi Championship
Gold medal – first place	2014 California, USA	+76.5kg
Gold medal – first place	2015 California, USA	+71.5kg
Gold medal – first place	2016 California, USA	+76.5kg

Brazilian Nationals Nogi Championship
Gold medal – first place	2015 Rio de Janeiro, Brazil	Absolute
Gold medal – first place	2015 Rio de Janeiro, Brazil	+76.5kg

Andresa Corrêa is a Brazilian Jiu Jitsu (BJJ) 3x black belt Brazilian Jiu Jitsu World Championship champion and 3x black belt World Nogi Brazilian Jiu-Jitsu Championship champion. She is one of a select few athletes to have won each of the major Gi Championships on more than one occasion: World Championship x3, European Open Championship x2, Pan Jiu-Jitsu Championship x2 and Brazilian Nationals Championship x4.

In the 2016 season, Corrêa won her category and came third in the absolute at the 2016 World Championship. That year she also won a gold medal in the World Nogi championship.

Andresa began training in 1996 at Mestre Carlos Rollyson's academy in Bragança Paulista. She moved to the Alliance Jiu Jitsu academy in São Paulo in 2010 to train under Mestre Fabio Gurgel.
