= Dominyka Obelenyte =

Brazilian jiu-jitsu practitioner from Lithuania

- Born: 30 July 1995 (age 31)
- Nationality: Lithuanian/American
- Division: Gi Weight Classes; Heavy/Super-Heavy
- Style: Brazilian Jiu-Jitsu
- Team: Alliance Jiu Jitsu
- Trainer: Marcelo Garcia (Note: until September 2016); Fabio Clemente
- Rank: BJJ black belt

Dominyka Obelenyte (born 30 July 1995) is a Lithuanian and American submission grappler and Brazilian jiu-jitsu black belt competitor. Obelenyte is a multiple Brazilian jiu-jitsu world champion in coloured belt and a four times black belt world champion in both her weight class and in the open division accomplished by the age of 20.

== Career ==
Dominyka Obelenyte was born on 30 July 1995 in Kaunas, Lithuania. When Obelenyte was 6 her family moved to the United States. Obelenyte started training Jiu-Jitsu at 9 years old in a Gracie Humaitá Affiliate in New Jersey after being bullied in elementary school. After receiving her orange belt she trained under legendary jiu-jitsu pioneer and world champion Emily Kwok in Maryland who then took her to the Marcelo Garcia Academy in New York.

Obelenyte began competing under Marcelo Garcia; as a blue belt Obelenyte became world champion for the first time competing in the adult division at the age of 14. As a purple belt she won the absolute division at age 15 followed by two brown belt world championship titles at ages 17 and 18. She was the first woman to receive her black belt under Garcia on 15 January 2015 at the age of 19. As a black belt she won double gold in her weight and in the open class division at the 2016 IBJJF World Championship, the first rookie black belt and the first European to win double gold at that tournament. In 2017 following a shoulder injury, Obelenyte announced that she was taking some time off from competing to focus on her studies at Columbia University.

== Brazilian Jiu-Jitsu competitive summary ==
Main Achievements at black belt level:

- 4 x IBJJF World Champion (2015, (Note: Weight and absolute) 2016)
- 2 x Pan American Champion (2016–2015)
- IBJFF European Championship (2015 (Note: Absolute))
- 2nd place Pan American Championship (2016)
- 3rd place IBJFF European Championship (2015)

Main Achievements (Coloured Belts):

- 4x IBJJF World Champion (2014 & 2013 brown, 2011 purple, 2010 blue)
- 2x Pan American Champion (2014 brown, 2013 purple)
- IBJFF European Champion (2012 purple)
- 2nd place Pan American Championship (2014 brown, 2013 purple, 2010 blue)
- 3rd place IBJJF World NoGi Championship (2010 blue/purple)

== Instructor lineage ==
Helio Gracie > Rolls Gracie > Romero Cavalcanti > Fabio Gurgel > Marcelo Garcia > Dominyka Obelenyte
