= Gabi Pessanha =

Brazilian jiu-jitsu grappler (born 2000)

Gabrieli Pessanha
- Born: Gabrieli Pessanha; August 8, 2000 (age 26); Rio de Janeiro, Brazil
- Other names: Gabi Pessanha
- Nationality: Brazilian
- Height: 5 ft 9 in (1.75 m)
- Weight: 198 lb (90 kg; 14.1 st)
- Division: Super-Heavyweight
- Style: Brazilian jiu-jitsu
- Fighting out of: Rio de Janeiro, Brazil
- Team: Infight
- Rank: BJJ black belt under Márcio de Deus

Gabrieli 'Gabi' Pessanha is a professional Brazilian jiu-jitsu grappler from Brazil.

== Early career ==
At 17 years old, she was the only athlete to win a double grand slam at purple belt in 2018, winning Mundials, Euros, Pans and Brasileiros.

== Black belt career ==
At the age of 18, Pessanha was promoted to black belt in June 2019 by Marcio de Deus.

Pessanha competed at BJJ Bet 2 on August 1, 2021 where she fought multiple-time world champion Tayane Porfirio in the co-main event, narrowly losing by two points. On September 6, 2021, Pessanha won gold in the super-heavyweight division of the IBJJF Pan Championship. She finished the year by winning gold medals in both the super-heavyweight and the absolute division at the IBJJF World Championship on December 12, 2021. Pessanha went 31-5 throughout the course of the year and was awarded "Female Grappler of the Year" at the JitsMagazine 2021 BJJ Awards as a result.

=== 2022 - First double grand slam ===
Pessanha experienced an unprecedented year of success in 2022, which she started by winning gold medals in the super-heavyweight and absolute divisions at the IBJJF European Championship on February 20, 2022. She then repeated that feat at the IBJJF Pan Championship on April 10, 2022, winning gold in the super-heavyweight and absolute divisions once again. In her third major IBJJF tournament of the year, she won gold in the super-heavyweight and absolute divisions once again at the Campeonato Brasileiro de Jiu-Jitsu. To finish off the year, Pessanha won another pair of gold medals in the super-heavyweight and absolute divisions at the IBJJF World Championship on June 5, 2022 and completed a double grand slam. She finished the year with over 50 wins in competition and not a single loss, earning her "Female Grappler of the Year (Gi)" at the Jitsmagazine 2022 BJJ Awards.

=== 2023 - Second double grand slam ===
Pessanha started out 2023 in the exact same fashion, winning gold medals in the super-heavyweight and absolute divisions at the IBJJF European Championship on January 29, 2023. She continued her success at the IBJJF Pan Championship on March 26, 2023, by winning both the super-heavyweight and absolute divisions once again. Pessanha then competed at the IBJJF Rio Fall Open on April 1, 2023 where she won five matches in a row and took gold medals in the super-heavyweight and absolute divisions. On May 7, 2023, Pessanha returned to the Campeonato Brasileiro de Jiu-Jitsu and once again won both the super-heavyweight and absolute divisions at the event. Pessanha returned to the IBJJF World Championship 2023 on June 3 and 4, winning both the super-heavyweight and the absolute division once again.

Pessanha competed in the IBJJF Vitoria Open 2023 on August 5, 2023 and won gold medals in both the super-heavyweight and absolute divisions. She then competed at the IBJJF Jiu-Jitsu Con International on September 1, 2023 and won gold medals in both the super-heavyweight and absolute divisions.

Pessanha then competed in a women's heavyweight grand prix at BJJ Stars 11 on September 9, 2023. She defeated three opponents on the same night and won the title. She returned to IBJJF competition at the IBJJF Curitiba Spring Open 2023 on October 8, 2023, winning gold medals in the super-heavyweight and absolute division.

Pessanha won a gold medal in the heavyweight division of the Abu Dhabi World Professional Jiu-Jitsu Championship 2023 on November 10, 2023.

Pessanha competed in the women's super-heavyweight division of The Crown alongside Melissa Stricker, Tayane Porfírio, and Amy Campo on November 19, 2023. She beat both opponents and won the division.

Pessanha won "Female Grappler of the Year (Gi)" at the JitsMagazine BJJ Awards 2023.

=== 2024 - Third double grand slam ===
Pessanha's coach Marcio de Deus announced that she would be making her no gi debut at some point during 2024.

Pessanha started the competitive year by winning gold medals in both the super-heavyweight and the absolute divisions at the IBJJF Rio Summer Open on January 14, 2024. She then won gold medals in both the super-heavyweight and absolute divisions of the IBJJF European Championship on January 27, 2024. She also won gold medals in both the super-heavyweight and absolute divisions of the IBJJF Pan Championship 2024 on March 24, 2024.

Pessanha won gold medals in both the super-heavyweight and absolute divisions of the IBJJF World Championship 2024 on June 1, 2024. She then won both the super-heavyweight and absolute divisions at the IBJJF São Paulo Open on September 15, 2024. Pessanha also won the super-heavyweight and absolute divisions at the IBJJF Rio Spring Open 2024 on October 19, 2024.

Pessanha then competed in the super-heavyweight division at the second edition of The Crown on November 17, 2024. She defeated Mayara Custódio, Tamiris Silva, and Melissa Cueto to win the title for the second time.

Pessanha then made her no gi debut at the IBJJF No Gi World Championship 2024. she won gold medals in the super-heavyweight and absolute divisions.

Pessanha won "Female Grappler of the Year (Gi)" at the Jits Magazine BJJ Awards 2024.

=== 2025 ===
Pessanha won gold medals in both the super-heavyweight and absolute divisions of the IBJJF European Championship 2025. She then won gold medals in both the super-heavyweight and absolute divisions of the IBJJF Pan Championship 2025.

She then defended her absolute title against Tayane Porfirio at BJJ Stars 15 on April 26, 2025. Pessanha won the match by submission.

Pessanha then won gold medals in both the super-heavyweight and absolute divisions at the IBJJF No Gi Brazilian National Championship 2025.
