= Diego Oliveira =

Diego Oliveira may refer to:

- Diego Oliveira (footballer, born 1987), Brazilian footballer
- Diego Oliveira (footballer, born 1990), Brazilian footballer
- Diego Ângelo de Oliveira (born 1986), Brazilian footballer
- Diego Gama de Oliveira (born 1983), Brazilian footballer
