= Bruno Malfacine =

Brazilian Jiu-Jitsu practitioner and mixed martial artist from Brazil

- Born: 28 August 1986 (age 40); Duque de Caxias, Rio de Janeiro, Brazil
- Nationality: (Brazil) Brazilian
- Height: 5 ft 4 in (163 cm)
- Weight: 125 lb (57 kg; 8 st 13 lb)
- Division: Flyweight
- Team: Alliance Jiu Jitsu
- Rank: Black belt in BJJ

Mixed martial arts record
- Total: 3
- Wins: 3
- By submission: 3
- Losses: 0

Other information
- Mixed martial arts record from Sherdog

Bruno Malfacine (born 28 August 1986 in Duque de Caxias, Rio de Janeiro, Brazil) is a Brazilian Jiu Jitsu (BJJ) competitor. Malfacine, a winner of 10 World Championships, was inducted into the International Brazilian Jiu-Jitsu Federation Hall of Fame and is widely considered to be the best roosterweight of all time.

== Biography ==
Bruno Malfacine was born on 28 August 1986 in Duque de Caxias, Rio de Janeiro, Brazil. He began training in Brazilian Jiu-Jitsu in 1998 at the age of eleven under Carlos Santana. After Santana stopped coaching, Malfacine moved to the Gama Filho team and was awarded his black belt there. In 2008, he moved to São Paulo, to train with Fabio Gurgel, at the Alliance team, where he has achieved ten world titles.

In 2020, Malfacine opened up his own branch of Alliance Jiu-Jitsu in Orlando, Florida, where he currently teaches.

Bruno "Bad Boy" Malfacine has also competed in MMA and has a professional record of 3–0.

== Mixed martial arts record ==
Professional record breakdown
3 matches	3 wins	0 losses
By knockout	0	0
By submission	3	0
By decision	0	0
Draws	0	
No contests	0	

Res.	Record	Opponent	Method	Event	Date	Round	Time	Location	Notes
Win	3–0	Cristian Rodriguez	Submission	Brave CF 16: Abu Dhabi	September 21, 2018	1	4:20	Abu Dhabi, United Arab Emirates	
Win	2–0	Rafael Vinicius Pereira Costa	Submission (armbar)	Brave CF 11: Mineiro vs. Santiago	April 13, 2018	1	3:18	Belo Horizonte, Brazil	
Win	1–0	Romario Garcia	Submission (armbar)	Shooto Brazil 74	August 27, 2017	1	1:34	Rio de Janeiro, Brazil	
