= Luanna Alzuguir =

Brazilian Jiu Jitsu practitioner

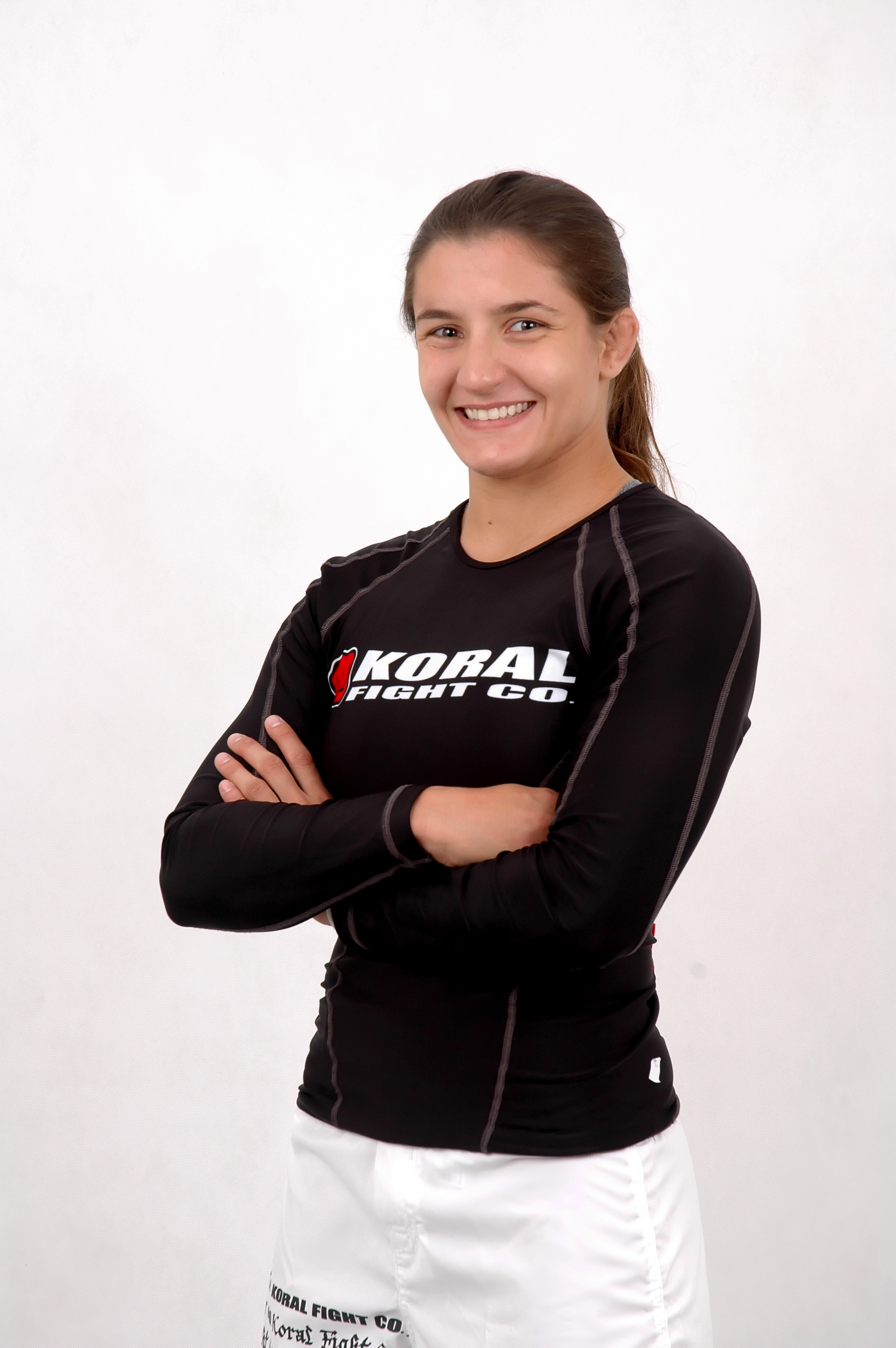
- Born: August 16, 1985 (age 41); São Paulo, Brazil
- Fighting out of: Missouri, United States
- Team: Alliance Jiu Jitsu
- Rank: 4th deg. BJJ black belt

Luanna Alzuguir (born 16 August 1985) is a Brazilian submission grappler and black belt Brazilian jiu-jitsu practitioner and coach. Alzuguir is a 5x world jiu-jitsu champion, an ADCC submission fighting world champion and a member of the IBJJF hall of fame, she is known as one of the main figures in women's jiu-jitsu history.

== Biography ==
Luanna Alzuguir Marton Moraes was born on 16 August 1985 in São Paulo, Brazil. Alzuguir started training Brazilian jiu-jitsu (BJJ) at age 9, competing for the first time in 1994. Alzuguir was awarded her black belt from Marco Barbosa in December 2007.

== Brazilian Jiu-Jitsu competitive summary ==
Main Achievements (Black Belt):

- IBJJF Hall of fame Athlete
- IBJJF #1 Ranked Athlete (2013)
- ADCC World Champion (2009)
- 5 x IBJJF World Champion (2009 / 2010 (Note: Absolute) / 2011 / 2012 / 2013)
- IBJJF World No-Gi Champion (2018)
- 5 x IBJJF European Open Champion (2011 / 2013 (Note: Weight and absolute) / 2014)
- 4 x IBJJF Pan Champion (2010 / 2011 / 2012)
- 3 x CBJJ Brazilian Nationals Champion (2009 / 2013)
- 3 x UAEJJF Abu Dhabi Pro Champion (2010 / 2011 / 2012)
- 2 x CBJJE World Cup Champion (2007)

== Personal life ==
Alzuguir is married to five-time black belt IBJJF World champion Ana Carolina Vieira.
