= World IBJJF Jiu-Jitsu No-Gi Championship =

Brazilian Jiu-Jitsu competitions

World No-Gi Brazilian Jiu-Jitsu Championship
Competition details
- Location: Long Beach, California
- Local name(s): Sem Kimono Mundials, No-Gi Worlds
- Discipline: Brazilian Jiu-Jitsu
- Organiser: International Brazilian Jiu-Jitsu Federation

History
- First edition: 2007
- Editions: 15
- Most wins: Caio Terra (10)

The World IBJJF Jiu-Jitsu No-Gi Championship is a no-gi Brazilian jiu-jitsu (BJJ) tournament hosted annually by the IBJJF commonly held at California State University in Long Beach, California. It was most recently held December 11-14, 2024 in Las Vegas at the Las Vegas Convention Center.

== History ==
Since its creation in 2007, Caio Terra has won 10 Men's IBJJF No-Gi World Championships, the highest in history. As of 2024, Bia Mesquita, Tammi Musumeci and Mayssa Bastos have won 5 Women's IBJJF No-Gi World Championships, the highest numbers in history.

== Weight classes ==
IBJJF No Gi weight classes
Weight divisions	Adults/Masters Men	Juvenile No Gi – Men	Adults/Masters No Gi Women	Juvenile No Gi – Women
Rooster	55.5 kg (122.4 lb)	51.50 kg (113.5 lb)	46.5 kg (102.5 lb)	42.50 kg (93.7 lb)
Light or Super Feather	61.5 kg (135.6 lb)	56.50 kg (124.6 lb)	51.5 kg (113.5 lb)	46.50 kg (102.5 lb)
Feather	67.5 kg (148.8 lb)	61.50 kg (135.6 lb)	56.5 kg (124.6 lb)	50.50 kg (111.3 lb)
Light	73.5 kg (162.0 lb)	66.50 kg (146.6 lb)	61.5 kg (135.6 lb)	54.50 kg (120.2 lb)
Middle	79.5 kg (175.3 lb)	71.50 kg (157.6 lb)	66.5 kg (146.6 lb)	58.50 kg (129.0 lb)
Medium Heavy	85.5 kg (188.5 lb)	76.50 kg (168.7 lb)	71.5 kg (157.6 lb)	62.50 kg (137.8 lb)
Heavy	91.5 kg (201.7 lb)	81.50 kg (179.7 lb)	76.5 kg (168.7 lb)	66.50 kg (146.6 lb)
Super Heavy	97.5 kg (215.0 lb)	86.50 kg (190.7 lb)	No weight limit	No weight limit
Ultra Heavy	No weight limit	No weight limit	n/a	n/a
Open Class	open to all divisions	depends on tournament	open to all divisions	depends on tournament

== Competitions by year ==
=== Men's black belt world champions ===
The results listed for 2022 are tentative. On 8 March 2023, the IBJJF announced that three 2022 adult black-belt gold medalists were disqualified due to use of performance-enhancing drugs. However, as of 10 March 2023, the IBJJF's official results still listed them as winners. This table assumes that the silver medalists were promoted to champion, although the IBJJF has not clearly stated that.

Year	55.5 kg	61.5 kg	67.5 kg	73.5 kg	79.5 kg	85.5 kg	91.5 kg	97.5 kg	+97.5 kg	Absolute
2007	(Japan) Takeo Tani (1/1)	(Brazil) Samuel Braga (1/1)	(Brazil) Rubens Charles (1/4)	(United States) Jeff Glover (1/1)	(Brazil) Pablo Popovitch (1/3)	(United States) Kim Johnson (1/1)	(Brazil) Roberto Camargo de Alencar (1/5)	(Brazil) Vinny Magalhaes (1/1)	(Brazil) Bruno Paulista (1/1)	(United States) Jeff Monson (1/1)
2008	(Brazil) Pablo Texeira (1/2)	(Brazil) Caio Terra (1/10)	(Brazil) Bruno Frazatto (1/1)	(Brazil) Rubens Charles (2/4)	(Brazil) Daniel Moraes (1/1)	(Brazil) Saulo Ribeiro (1/1)	(Brazil) Roberto Alencar (2/5)	(Brazil) Gabriel Vella (1/1)	(Brazil) Antonio Braga Neto (1/3)	(Brazil) Antonio Braga Neto (2/3)
2009	(Brazil) Pablo Texeira (2/2)	(Brazil) Caio Terra (2/10)	(United States) Baret Yoshida (1/1)	(Brazil) Lucas Lepri (1/3)	(Brazil) Lucas Leite (1/3)	(Brazil) Romulo Barral (1/1)	(Brazil) Roberto Alencar (3/5)	(Brazil) Antonio Braga Neto (3/3)	(United States) Josh Barnett (1/1)	(Brazil) Roberto Alencar (4/5)
2010	(United States) Brandon Mullins (1/2)	(Brazil) Caio Terra (3/10)	(United States) Justin Rader (1/2)	(Brazil) Lucas Lepri (2/3)	(Brazil) Gilbert Burns (1/2)	(Brazil) Pablo Popovitch (2/3)	(United States) Rafael Lovato Jr. (1/3)	(Brazil) João Assis (1/3)	(Brazil) Roberto Abreu (1/7)	(Brazil) Roberto Abreu (2/7)
2011	(United States) Brandon Mullins (2/2)	(Brazil) Caio Terra (4/10)	(Brazil) Rubens Charles (3/4)	(Brazil) Lucas Lepri (3/3)	(Brazil) Victor Estima (1/1)	(United States) Rafael Lovato Jr. (2/3)	(Brazil) Lucas Leite (2/3)	(Brazil) Marcus Almeida (1/2)	(Brazil) Roberto Abreu (3/7)	(Brazil) Marcus Almeida (2/2)
2012	(Brazil) Caio Terra (5/10)	(Brazil) Henrique Rezende (1/1)	(Brazil) Rubens Charles (4/4)	(Brazil) Augusto Mendes (1/2)	(United States) De'Alonzio Jackson (1/2)	(Brazil) Pablo Popovitch (3/3)	(Brazil) Roberto Alencar (5/5)	(Brazil) Alexandre Ribeiro (1/2)	(Brazil) Roberto Abreu (4/7)	(Brazil) Alexandre Ribeiro (2/2)
2013	(Brazil) Caio Terra (6/10)	(Brazil) Laercio Fernandes (1/1)	(United States) Justin Rader (2/2)	(United States) Jonathan Torres (1/1)	(Brazil) Gilbert Burns (2/2)	(Brazil) Eduardo Telles (1/1)	(Brazil) Jackson Sousa (1/1)	(United States) James Puopolo (1/1)	(United States) Rafael Lovato Jr. (3/3)	(Brazil) Murilo Santana (1/1)
2014	(Brazil) Caio Terra (7/10)	(Brazil) João Miyao (1/4)	(Brazil) Samir Chantre (1/1)	(United States) AJ Agazarm (1/1)	(Brazil) Marcelo Mafra (1/2)	(United States) Keenan Cornelius (1/2)	(Brazil) Lucas Leite (3/3)	(Brazil) João Assis (2/3)	(Brazil) Yuri Simões (1/4)	(Brazil) Yuri Simões (2/4)
2015	(Brazil) Caio Terra (8/10)	(Brazil) João Miyao (2/4)	(Brazil) Augusto Mendes (2/2)	(Brazil) Michael Langhi (1/1)	(United States) De'Alonzio Jackson (2/2)	(Brazil) Lucas Barbosa (1/4)	(Brazil) Felipe Pena (1/2)	(Brazil) João Assis (3/3)	(Brazil) Gabriel Lucas (1/1)	(Brazil) Felipe Pena (2/2)
2016	(Brazil) Caio Terra (9/10)	(United States) Michael Musumeci (1/1)	(Brazil) Osvaldo Moizinho (1/2)	(Brazil) Marcio Barbosa (1/1)	(Brazil) Marcelo Mafra (2/2)	(United States) Josh Hinger (1/3)	(Brazil) Lucas Barbosa (2/4)	(Brazil) Luis Panza (1/1)	(Brazil) Yuri Simões (3/4)	(Brazil) Yuri Simões (4/4)
2017	(Brazil) Caio Terra (10/10)	(Brazil) João Miyao (3/4)	(Brazil) Osvaldo Moizinho (2/2)	(Brazil) Renato Canuto (1/1)	(United States) Josh Hinger (2/3)	(United States) Keenan Cornelius (2/2)	(Brazil) Arnaldo Maidana (1/1)	(Brazil) Lucas Barbosa (3/4)	(Brazil) Roberto Abreu (5/7)	(Brazil) Lucas Barbosa (4/4)
2018	(Japan) Nobuhiro Sawada (1/1)	(Brazil) João Miyao (4/4)	(Brazil) Kennedy Maciel (1/1)	(United States) Gianni Grippo (1/3)	(Brazil) Hugo Marques (1/2)	(United States) Josh Hinger (3/3)	(United States) Tim Spriggs (1/1)	(Brazil) Kaynan Duarte (1/1)	(United States) Gordon Ryan (1/2)	(United States) Gordon Ryan (2/2)
2019	(Brazil) Thalison Soares (1/1)	(Brazil) Hiago George (1/1)	(Brazil) Alexssandro Sodré (1/1)	(Ecuador) Johnny Tama (1/1)	(Canada) Dante Leon (1/2)	(Brazil) Manuel Ribamar (1/1)	(Poland) Adam Wardziński (1/1)	(Brazil) Vinicius Gazola (1/1)	(Brazil) Roberto Abreu (6/7)	(Brazil) Victor Hugo (1/2)
2021	(United States) Estevan Martinez-Garcia (1/1)	(Brazil) Carlos 'Bebeto' Oliveira (1/1)	(Brazil) Diego Oliveira Batista (1/2)	(United States) Gianni Grippo (2/3)	(Brazil) Hugo Marques (2/2)	(Brazil) Jeferson Guaresi (1/1)	(Brazil) Pedro Marinho (1/2)	(United States) Devhonte Johnson (1/1)	(Brazil) Roberto Abreu (7/7)	(Brazil) Pedro Marinho (2/2)
2022	(Yemen) Osamah Almarwai (1/1)	(Brazil) Lucas Pinheiro (1/1)	(United States) Gianni Grippo (3/3)	(Canada) Dante Leon (2/2)	(Brazil) Andy Murasaki (1/1)	(Costa Rica) Sebastian Rodriguez (1/1)		(Brazil) Fellipe Trovo (1/1)	(Brazil) Victor Hugo (2/2)	
2023	(Brazil) Everton Souza (1/2)	(United States) Edwin 'Junny' Ocasio (1/1)	(Brazil) Diego Oliveira Batista (2/2)	(Brazil) Lucas Valente (1/2)	(Norway) Tommy Langaker (1/1)	(Brazil) Ronaldo Junior (1/1)	(Honduras) Elder Cruz (1/2)	(Uruguay) Javier Zaruski (1/1)	(Brazil) Roosevelt Souza (1/3)	(Ecuador) Roberto Jimenez (1/1)
2024	(Brazil) Everton Souza (2/2)	(United States) Zach Kaina (1/1)	(United States) Cole Abate (1/2)	(Brazil) Lucas Valente (2/2)	(Brazil) Alexandre de Jesus (1/1)	(Brazil) Wallisson Souza (1/1)	(United Kingdom) Faris Benlamkadem (1/1)	(Brazil) Marcos Carrozzino (1/1)	(Brazil) Lucas Montalvao (1/1)	(Honduras) Elder Cruz (2/2)
2025	(Scotland) Shay Montague (1/1)	(Brazil) Marcos Gomes (1/1)	(Brazil) Marco Mendes (1/1)	(United States) Cole Abate (2/2)	(Norway) Tarik Hopstock (1/1)	(Poland) Pawel Jaworski (1/1)	(Panama) Javier Barter (1/1)	(Australia) Nicholas Maglicic (1/1)	(Brazil) Roosevelt Souza (2/3)	(Brazil) Roosevelt Souza (3/3)

=== Women's black belt world champions ===
Prior to 2012, women's adult brown and black belts competed together at the "Adult / Brown Black" belt level.

Year	n/a	51.5 kg	56.5 kg	61.5 kg	66.5 kg	71.5 kg	+71.5 kg	n/a	Absolute
2007			(Brazil) Bianca Andrade Barreto (1/2)	(United States) Gazzy Parman (1/1)	(Brazil) Hannette Staack (1/1)	(South Africa) Penny Thomas (1/1)			
2008		(Brazil) Leticia Ribeiro (1/2)	(Brazil) Bianca Andrade Barreto (2/2)	(Brazil) Michele Nicolini (1/4)		(Brazil) Ana Laura Cordeiro (1/2)	(Brazil) Gabrielle Garcia (1/4)		(Brazil) Ana Laura Cordeiro (2/2)
2009		(Brazil) Sofia Amarante (1/2)		(Australia) Sophia McDermott Drysdale (1/2)	(United States) Hillary Williams (1/2)	(United States) Valerie Worthington (1/1)	(Brazil) Gabrielle Garcia (2/4)		(United States) Hillary Williams (2/2)
2010		(Brazil) Leticia Ribeiro (2/2)		(Brazil) Beatriz Mesquita (1/5)	(Canada) Emily Kwok (1/1)	(Brazil) Luiza Monteiro (1/4)	(United States) Katrina Weilbacher (1/1)		(Brazil) Michele Nicolini (2/4)
2011			(Brazil) Michele Nicolini (3/4)	(Brazil) Beatriz Mesquita (2/5)	(United States) Rachel Demara (1/1)	(Brazil) Fernanda Mazzelli (1/2)	(United States) Emily Wetzel (1/1)		(Brazil) Michelle Nicolini (4/4)
2012		(Brazil) Sofia Amarante (2/2)	(Brazil) Ana Carolina Vidal (1/2)	(Brazil) Beatriz Mesquita (3/5)	(Brazil) Luiza Monteiro (2/4)		(Brazil) Fernanda Mazzelli (2/2)		(United States) Tammy Griego (1/1)
2013			(United States) Tammi Musumeci (1/5)	(Brazil) Ana Carolina Vidal (2/2)		(Brazil) Luiza Monteiro (3/4)	(Brazil) Talita Nogueira (1/3)		(Brazil) Talita Nogueira (2/3)
Year	47.5 kg	51.5 kg	56.5 kg	61.5 kg	66.5 kg	71.5 kg	76.5 kg	+76.5 kg	Absolute
2014			(United States) Mackenzie Dern (1/2)	(Australia) Sophia McDermott Drysdale (2/2)	(Brazil) Luiza Monteiro (4/4)		(Brazil) Andresa Correa (1/3)	(Brazil) Gabrielle Garcia (3/4)	(Brazil) Gabrielle Garcia (4/4)
2015		(Brazil) Pati Fontes (1/3)	(United States) Tammi Musumeci (2/5)	(Brazil) Karen Antunes (1/1)	(Brazil) Angelica Galvao (1/1)	(Brazil) Andresa Correa (2/3)			(United States) Mackenzie Dern (2/2)
2016		(Brazil) Pati Fontes (2/3)	(Brazil) Talita Alencar (1/4)	(United States) Tammi Musumeci (3/5)	(United States) Amanda Alequin (1/1)	(Brazil) Nathiely de Jesus (1/3)	(Brazil) Andresa Correa (3/3)		(Brazil) Nathiely de Jesus (2/3)
2017		(Brazil) Pati Fontes (3/3)	(Brazil) Talita Alencar (2/4)	(United States) Jena Bishop (1/1)	(United States) Raquel Pa'aluhi (1/3)		(Brazil) Jéssica Flowers (1/4)		(Brazil) Jéssica Flowers (2/4)
2018		(Brazil) Mayssa Bastos (1/5)	(Wales) Ffion Davies (1/4)	(Brazil) Catherine Perret (1/1)	(Brazil) Beatriz Mesquita (4/5)	(Brazil) Luanna Alzuguir (1/1)	(Brazil) Nathiely de Jesus (3/3)	(Brazil) Jéssica Flowers (3/4)	(Brazil) Beatriz Mesquita (5/5)
2019	(Brazil) Mayssa Bastos (2/5)	(Brazil) Amanda Monteiro (1/1)	(Brazil) Talita Alencar (3/4)	(Brazil) Nathalie Ribeiro (1/1)	(United States) Raquel Pa'aluhi (2/3)	(United States) Vedha Toscano (1/1)	(Brazil) Talita Nogueira (3/3)	(United States) Kendall Reusing (1/2)	(Brazil) Jéssica Flowers (4/4)
2021		(Brazil) Mayssa Bastos (3/5)	(Brazil) Talita Alencar (4/4)	(Wales) Ffion Davies (2/4)	(United States) Raquel Pa'aluhi (3/3)	(United States) Elisabeth Clay (1/3)	(Brazil) Rafaela Guedes (1/2)	(Brazil) Mayara Custódio (1/1)	(Brazil) Rafaela Guedes (2/2)
2022	(Brazil) Jhenifer Aquino (1/2)	(Vietnam) Alex Nguyen (1/1)	(United States) Tammi Musumeci (4/5)	(Canada) Brianna Ste-Marie (1/1)	(United States) Elisabeth Clay (2/3)	(United States) Amy Campo (1/1)	(Brazil) Andressa Cintra (1/2)	(Brazil) Letícia Cardozo (1/1)	(United States) Elisabeth Clay (3/3)
2023	(Brazil) Mayssa Bastos (4/5)	(United States) Tammi Musumeci (5/5)	(United States) Alex Enriquez (1/1)	(Wales) Ffion Davies (3/4)	(Brazil) Gabrielle McComb (1/1)	(United States) Elizabeth Katherine Mitrović (1/1)	(Brazil) Andressa Cintra (2/2)	(United States) Kendall Reusing (2/2)	(Wales) Ffion Davies (4/4)
2024	(Brazil) Jhenifer Aquino (2/2)	(Brazil) Mayssa Bastos (5/5)	(Brazil) Cassia Moura (1/1)	(Canada) Brianna Ste-Marie (1/1)	(United States) Elisabeth Clay (1/1)	(Finland) Salla Simola (1/1)	(Spain) Anabel Lopez (1/1)	(Brazil) Gabi Pessanha (1/2)	(Brazil) Gabi Pessanha (2/2)

== List of winners by total titles ==
Rank	Winner	Total	Absolute	Weight Class	Winning years	Gender
1	(Brazil) Caio Terra	10	0	10	2008, 2009, 2010, 2011, 2012, 2013, 2014, 2015, 2016, 2017	M
2	(Brazil) Roberto Abreu	7	1	6	2010, 2011, 2012, 2017, 2019, 2021	M
3	(Brazil) Beatriz Mesquita	5	1	4	2010, 2011, 2012, 2018	F
3	(Brazil) Roberto Alencar	5	1	4	2007, 2008, 2009, 2012	M
5	(Brazil) Michelle Nicolini	4	2	2	2008, 2010, 2011	F
5	(Brazil) Jéssica Flowers	4	2	2	2017, 2018, 2019	F
5	(Brazil) Yuri Simões	4	2	2	2014, 2016	M
5	(Brazil) Gabrielle Garcia	4	1	3	2008, 2009, 2014	F
5	(Brazil) Lucas Barbosa	4	1	3	2015, 2016, 2017	M
5	(Brazil) Luiza Monteiro	4	0	4	2010, 2012, 2013, 2014	F
5	(Brazil) Talita Alencar	4	0	4	2016, 2017, 2019, 2021	F
5	(United States) Tammi Musumeci	4	0	4	2013, 2015, 2016, 2022	F
5	(Brazil) Rubens Charles	4	0	4	2007, 2008, 2011, 2012	M
5	(Brazil) João Miyao	4	0	4	2014, 2015, 2017, 2018	M
15	(Brazil) Nathiely de Jesus	3	1	2		F
15	(Brazil) Talita Nogueira	3	1	2		F
15	(United States) Elisabeth Clay	3	1	2		F
15	(Brazil) Antonio Braga Neto	3	1	2		M
15	(Brazil) Andresa Correa	3	0	3		F
15	(Brazil) Pati Fontes	3	0	3		F
15	(Brazil) Mayssa Bastos	3	0	3		F
15	(United States) Raquel Pa'aluhi	3	0	3		F
15	(Brazil) Lucas Lepri	3	0	3		M
15	(Brazil) Pablo Popovitch	3	0	3		M
15	(United States) Rafael Lovato Jr.	3	0	3		M
15	(Brazil) Lucas Leite	3	0	3		M
15	(Brazil) João Assis	3	0	3		M
15	(United States) Josh Hinger	3	0	3		M
15	(United States) Gianni Grippo	3	0	3		M

== See also ==
- International Brazilian Jiu-Jitsu Federation
- World IBJJF Jiu-Jitsu Championship
- Pan Jiu-Jitsu Championship
- Pan Jiu-Jitsu No-Gi Championship
- European Open Championship
- European Open Nogi Championship
- Brazilian National Jiu-Jitsu Championship
- Brazilian Nationals Jiu-Jitsu No-Gi Championship
- Asian Open Championship
- ADCC Submission Fighting World Championship
