= Pan IBJJF Jiu-Jitsu No-Gi Championship =

Brazilian Jiu-Jitsu competitions

Competition details
- Discipline: Brazilian Jiu-Jitsu
- Organiser: International Brazilian Jiu-Jitsu Federation

History
- First edition: 2007
- Editions: 16
- Most wins: Male: Joao Miyao (5), Lucas Lepri, Pablo Popovitch, Gianni Grippo (4) Female: Alison Tremblay (5)

Pan IBJJF Jiu-Jitsu No-Gi Championship is one of the main no-gi Brazilian jiu-jitsu competitions organized by the International Brazilian Jiu-Jitsu Federation (IBJJF). Held annually since 2007, the tournament is considered one of the most prestigious in the no-gi circuit, attracting elite athletes from around the world. Like the traditional Pan IBJJF (with gi), the Pan No-Gi follows IBJJF rules and is open to competitors of different age divisions and belt ranks.

The event is part of the IBJJF international competition calendar and is important both for ranking points and athlete exposure, especially for those who specialize in no-gi grappling. It is typically held in the United States, often in California, and welcomes both professional and amateur athletes.

== List of Pan Jiu-Jitsu No-Gi Champions in Adult Male Black Belt division, by Year and Weight ==
Year	55.5 kg	61.5 kg	67.5 kg	73.5 kg	79.5 kg	85.5 kg	91.5 kg	97.5 kg	+97.5 kg	Absolute
2007		(Brazil) Alex Taveira (1/1)		(Brazil) Marcio Feitosa (1/1)		(Brazil) Saulo Ribeiro (1/1)		(Brazil) Flavio Almeida (1/1)	(Brazil) Rodrigo Medeiros (1/1)	
2008	(United States) Jason Yang (1/1)	(Brazil) Samuel Braga (1/1)	(Brazil) Renan Borges (1/1)	(Brazil) Rubens Charles (1/1)	(Brazil) Marcel Azevedo (1/1)	(Brazil) Pablo Popovitch (1/4)	(Brazil) Braulio Estima (1/2)	(Canada) Misha Cirkunov (1/1)	(Brazil) Bruno Paulista (1/1)	(Brazil) Braulio Estima (2/2)
2009		(United States) Brandon Mullins (1/1)	(Brazil) Rodrigo Faria (1/1)	(Brazil) Lucas Lepri (1/4)	(Brazil) Daniel Moraes (1/1)	(Iceland) Gunnar Nelson (1/1)	(Brazil) Igor Gracie (1/1)	(Brazil) Andre Gusmao (1/1)	(Brazil) Rolles Gracie (1/1)	(Brazil) Rafael Franca (1/1)
2010		(Brazil) Caio Terra (1/2)	(Brazil) Henrique Rezende (1/2)	(United States) Jonathan Torres (1/1)	(Brazil) Lucas Lepri (2/4)	(Brazil) Pablo Popovitch (2/4)	(Brazil) Diego Nogueira (1/2)	(Brazil) Marcus Oliveira (1/1)	(Brazil) Victor Costa (1/1)	(Brazil) Pablo Popovitch (3/4)
2011		(Brazil) Caio Terra (2/2)	(Brazil) Andre Carvalho (1/1)	(Brazil) Lucas Lepri (3/4)	(Brazil) Davi Ramos (1/2)	(Brazil) Kayron Gracie (1/1)	(Brazil) Alexandre Moreira (1/1)	(Brazil) Francisco Tavares (1/1)	(Brazil) Petrus Melo (1/1)	(Brazil) Davi Ramos (2/2)
2012		(Brazil) Henrique Rezende (2/2)	(Brazil) Osvaldo Moizinho (1/1)	(Brazil) Lucas Lepri (4/4)	(Brazil) Vinicius Tavares (1/1)	(Brazil) Kleber Oliveira (1/1)	(Brazil) Roberto Alencar (1/1)	(Brazil) Diego Nogueira (2/2)	(Brazil) Diego Pereira de Santana (1/1)	(Brazil) Pablo Popovitch (4/4)
2013		(Brazil) Laercio Fernandes (1/1)	(Brazil) Samir Chantre (1/1)	(United States) AJ Agazarm (1/1)	(Brazil) Francisco Itturalde (1/1)	(Brazil) Murilo Santana (1/3)	(Brazil) Luiz Panza (1/1)	(United States) Ronnie Wuest Jr. (1/1)	(United States) Tom DeBlass (1/1)	(Brazil) Murilo Santana (2/3)
2014		(Brazil) João Miyao (1/5)	(Brazil) Osvaldo Moizinho (1/1)	(Brazil) Rodrigo Freitas (1/1)	(Brazil) Vitor Oliveira (1/1)	(Brazil) Claudio Cardoso (1/1)	(Brazil) Mauro Santiago (1/1)	(Brazil) Tiago Giussani (1/1)	(Brazil) Gabriel Lucas (1/1)	(Brazil) Jackson Sousa (1/3)
2015	(Brazil) Washington Lima (1/1)	(Brazil) João Miyao (2/5)	(Brazil) Paulo Miyao (1/2)	(United States) Garry Tonon (1/1)	(Brazil) Otávio Souza (1/1)	(Brazil) Marcos Tinoco (1/2)	(United States) Roberto Torralbas (1/1)	(Brazil) Guybson Sa (1/1)	(Brazil) Gustavo Dias Elias (1/1)	(Brazil) Matheus Diniz (1/1)
2016	(Brazil) Marcelo Cohen (1/1)	(Brazil) João Miyao (3/5)	(United States) Ian Sanders (1/1)	(United States) Gianni Grippo (1/5)	(United States) Jonathan Satava (1/2)	(United States) Dillon Danis (1/1)	(United States) Todd Mueckenheim (1/1)	(Brazil) Cassio Da Silva (1/1)	(United States) Aaron Johnson (1/3)	(United States) Jonathan Satava (2/2)
2017	(Brazil) Lucas Pinheiro (1/1)	(Brazil) João Miyao (4/5)	(United States) Gianni Grippo (2/5)	(Brazil) Renato Canuto (1/1)	(Canada) Dante Leon (1/3)	(Brazil) Lucas Rocha (1/1)	(France) Thomas Loubersanes (1/1)	(Brazil) Jackson Sousa (2/3)	(United States) Aaron Johnson (2/3)	(Brazil) Jackson Sousa (3/3)
2018	(United States) Kristian Woodmansee (1/1)	(Brazil) João Miyao (5/5)	(United States) Ian Sanders (1/1)	(United States) Gianni Grippo (3/5)	(Canada) Dante Leon (2/3)	(Brazil) Marcos Tinoco (2/2)	(Brazil) Romelu Souza (1/1)	(United States) Aaron Johnson (3/3)	(United States) Gordon Ryan (1/2)	(United States) Gordon Ryan (2/2)
2019	(Brazil) Marcelo Cohen (1/1)	(Brazil) Lucas Pinheiro (1/2)	(Brazil) Paulo Miyao (2/2)	(Brazil) Athos Miranda (1/1)	(Brazil) Jefferson Guaresi (1/1)	(Brazil) Jonnatas Gracie (1/1)	(Brazil) Murilo Santana (3/3)	(Brazil) Vinicius Gazola (1/1)	(Brazil) Max Gimenis (1/2)	(United States) Keenan Cornelius (1/1)
2020	(Brazil) Lucas Pinheiro (2/2)	(Brazil) Kennedy Maciel (1/1)	(Brazil) Alexandre Molinaro (1/1)	(Brazil) Johnatha Alves (1/1)	(Brazil) Jonnatas Gracie (1/1)	(United States) Andrew Wiltse (1/1)	(Brazil) Lucas Barbosa (1/2)	(Brazil) Kaynan Duarte (1/2)	(Brazil) Max Gimenis (2/2)	(Brazil) Kaynan Duarte (2/2)
2021	(United States) Estevan Martinez-Garcia (1/1)	(Brazil) Paulo Miyao (1/1)	(Brazil) Diego Oliveira (1/1)	(United States) Gianni Grippo (4/5)	(Brazil) Matheus Gabriel (1/1)	(Brazil) Jeferson Guaresi (1/1)	(United States) Giancarlo Bodoni (1/1)	(United States) Devonte Johnson (1/2)	(Brazil) Victor Hugo (1/1)	(Brazil) Lucas Barbosa (2/2)
2022	(Yemen) Osamah Almarwai (1/1)	(Brazil) Carlos 'Bebeto' Oliveira (1/1)	(United States) Gavin Corbe (1/1)	(United States) Deandre Corbe (1/1)	(Argentina) Francisco Cuneo (1/1)	(Brazil) Manuel Ribamar (1/1)	(Brazil) Pedro Rocha (1/2)	(Brazil) Fellipe Trovo (1/1)	(Brazil) Davi Cabral (1/1)	(Brazil) Henrique Ceconi (1/1)
2023	(United States) John Stapleton (1/1)	(United States) Edwin 'Junny' Ocasio (1/1)	(United States) Gianni Grippo (5/5)	(Brazil) Carlos Henrique (1/1)	(Canada) Oliver Taza (1/1)	(Brazil) Francisco Lo (1/1)	(Poland) Adam Wardzinski (1/1)	(Canada) Dante Leon (3/3)	(Brazil) Roosevelt Souza (1/1)	(Brazil) Pedro Rocha (2/2)
2024		(United States) Edwin Ocasio	(United States) Cole Anthony Abate	(Canada) Maximilian John Anthony Hanson	(Brazil) Natan Chueng Freitas	(Brazil) Alehander da Silva Mariano	(Brazil) Jose Jurema Nascimento de Carvalho	(Brazil) Rafael Lovato Jr.	(Brazil) Lucas Valentim Alves Montalvão	(United States) Devhonte M. Johnson

== List of Pan Jiu-Jitsu No-Gi Champions in Adult Female Black Belt Women's division, by Year and Weight ==
Year	-46.5 kg Rooster	-51.5 kg Light Feather	-56.5 kg Feather	-61.5 kg Light	-66.5 kg Middle	-71.5 kg Medium Heavy	-76.5 kg Heavy	+76.5 kg Super Heavy	Absolute
2007				(United States) Felicia Oh (1/1)					
2008			(Brazil) Fabiana Borges (1/1)						(Brazil) Thayse Nascimento (1/1)
2010			(Brazil) Sofia Amarante (1/2)		(Canada) Emily Kwok (1/4)				(Canada) Emily Kwok (2/4)
2011		(Brazil) Marcela Macedo (1/1)	(Brazil) Jennifer Petrina (1/1)		(Canada) Emily Kwok (3/4)		(United States) Cecilia Minshall (1/1)		(Canada) Emily Kwok (4/4)
2012			(Brazil) Sofia Amarante (2/2)			(Brazil) Thaysa da Silva (1/1)			(United States) Valerie Worthington (1/1)
2014			(Brazil) Bibiana Silva (1/1)		(Brazil) Luiza Monteiro (1/1)				(Brazil) Luiza Monteiro (1/1)
2015		(Brazil) Marcela Lawton (1/1)	(Brazil) Vianca Jager (1/1)	(Brazil) Karen Antunes (1/3)		(United States) Megan Nevill (1/1)		(Canada) Alison Tremblay (1/5)	(Canada) Alison Tremblay (2/5)
2016				(Brazil) Karen Antunes (2/3)	(Brazil) Carina Damm (1/1)	(Norway) Ida Fløisvik (1/1)		(Canada) Alison Tremblay (3/5)	(Brazil) Karen Antunes (3/3)
2017			(Brazil) Amanda Nogueira (1/1)	(Brazil) Michelle Nicolini (1/2)	(Brazil) Catherine Fuhro Perret (1/2)			(Canada) Alison Tremblay (4/5)	(Brazil) Michelle Nicolini (2/2)
2018		(Brazil) Mayssa Bastos (1/2)	(Brazil) Jessica Dos Santos (1/1)	(Brazil) Catherine Fuhro Perret (2/2)	(Brazil) Gabrielle McComb (1/3)	(Brazil) Monique Ricardo Carvalho (1/1)	(Poland) Maria Malyjasiak (1/3)	(Canada) Alison Tremblay (5/5)	(Poland) Maria Malyjasiak (3/3)
2019		(Brazil) Sofia Amarante (2/2)	(United States) Amanda Alequin (1/1)	(Brazil) Jaqueline Amorim (1/1)	(United States) Vedha Toscano (1/1)		(Poland) Maria Malyjasiak (3/3)		(United States) Laura Hallock (1/1)
2020			(Brazil) Gabrielle McComb (2/3)	(Brazil) Nathalie Ribeiro (1/2)		(United States) Vannessa Griffin (1/2)	(Brazil) Rafaela Guedes (1/2)	(United States) Tara White (1/1)	(Brazil) Rafaela Guedes (2/2)
2021		(Brazil) Mayssa Bastos (2/2)	(Brazil) Gabrielle McComb (3/3)	(Brazil) Nathalie Ribeiro (2/2)	(United States) Vanessa Griffin (2/2)	(United States) Elisabeth Clay (1/2)	(Poland) Maria Malyjasiak (1/2)	(United States) Kendall Reusing (1/1)	(United States) Elisabeth Clay (2/2)
2022	(Brazil) Jhenifer Aquino Gonzaga	(Vietnam) My Bao Nguyen	(United States) Alex Enriquez	(Brazil) Ana Cristina Araujo Rodrigues	(United States) Elisabeth Ann Clay	(Brazil) Thalyta Stefhane Lima Silva		(Brazil) Nathiely Karoline Melo de Jesus	(United States) Elisabeth Ann Clay
2023	(Brazil) Lavinia Francesconi Barbosa	(United States) Dorothy Dao	(Australia) Adele M. Fornarino	(Brazil) Jaine da Silva Fragoso	(Brazil) Deise dos Santos Leonanjo	(United States) Elizabeth Katherine Mitrovic	(Brazil) Maria Vitória Gonçalves Ruffatto	(Brazil) Roberta Pessoa Vieira Ribeiro	(Brazil) Roberta Pessoa Vieira Ribeiro
2024	(Brazil) Thaís Loureiro Felipe	(Brazil) Ana Carolina de Andrade Lima Soares da Silva	(Brazil) Ana Talita de Oliveira Alencar	(United States) Amanda Dean Bruse	(Australia) Nadia Frankland	(Philadelphia) Amanda Noel Leve	(United States) Elisabeth Ann Clay	(Brazil) Mayara Moreira Ribeiro	(United States) Elisabeth Ann Clay

== See also ==
- IBJJF
- World Championship
- World No-Gi Championship
- Pan Jiu-Jitsu Championship
- European Open Championship
- European Open Nogi Championship
- Brazilian National Jiu-Jitsu Championship
- Brazilian Nationals Jiu-Jitsu No-Gi Championship
- Asian Open Championship
- ADCC Submission Fighting World Championship
