= Pablo Popovitch =

Brazilian Jiu-Jitsu practitioner from Brazil

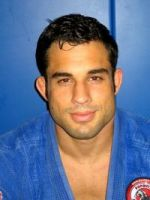
- Born: 9 September 1979 (age 47); Rio de Janeiro, Brazil
- Height: 5 ft 10 in (1.78 m)
- Weight: 188.8 lb (85.6 kg)
- Style: Brazilian Jiu-Jitsu
- Team: Team Popovitch
- Rank: 4th degree black belt in Brazilian Jiu-Jitsu

Mixed martial arts record
- Total: 1
- Wins: 1
- By submission: 1
- Losses: 0

Other information
- Mixed martial arts record from Sherdog
- Last updated on: 23/06/2012

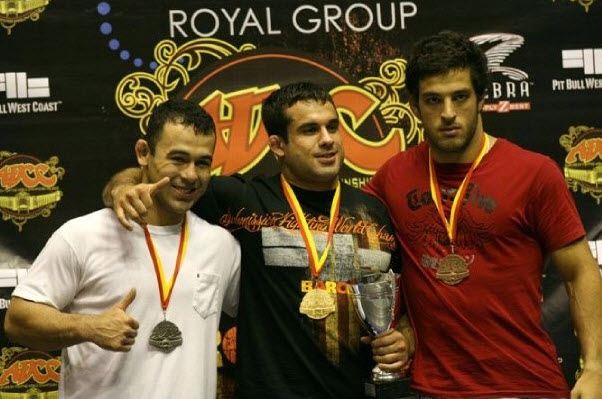
ADCC 2009, 1st place 76.9kg

Pablo Popovitch (born September 9, 1979) is a Brazilian jiu-jitsu practitioner, mixed martial artist and a 4th degree black belt under Jorge Popovitch.

== Biography ==
Pablo Popovitch became involved in BJJ as a 4-year-old. Born in Rio de Janeiro, Popovitch began instruction at Barra Gracie School, where his teachers were the Machado brothers, Rigan, Carlos and Jean Jaques.your brother Jairo, and sisters Krisla and Kyria, He and his family moved to Florida in 1995 when Pablo was 15. He continued to study BJJ under Grand Master Carlson Gracie. Popovitch entered the first ADCC North American trial in 2002, winning gold in the 77 kg division and earning an invite to ADCC 2003. His most notable achievement was winning the ADCC Submission Wrestling World Championship in 2009, taking first place in the 66–77 kg by defeating 4-time ADCC Champion Marcelo Garcia. He has also won the 2010 BJJ No-Gi World Jiu-Jitsu Championship 84 kg and absolute Championship(Closed Absolute with team Mates Roberto " Cyborg" Abreu and Buchecha). The 2007 BJJ No-Gi World Jiu-Jitsu Championship 84 kg, the 2010 Pan American No Gi Jiu-Jitsu 84 kg and absolute Championship. the 2008 Pan American No Gi Jiu-Jitsu 84 kg Championship., The Grapplers Quest 14 Times. He is a North American Grappling Association (N.A.G.A) superfight 10X champion and twice was an ADCC Finalist in the years of 2005 & 2007. Popovitch defeated Jeff Savoy in his Mixed Martial Arts debut by Submission due to strikes, in the 2nd round at the Rock and Rumble 3, June 4 in South Florida.

== Special awards ==
In recognition of his extraordinary contributions to the sport of grappling, Pablo Popovitch was inducted to the Grappling Hall Of Fame, February 13, 2010, by the North American Grappling Association. Also In 2010 he was awarded the "BJJ Fighter of the Year Award" by Gracie Mag – A magazine specialized in Brazilian Jiu Jitsu.

== Tournament results ==
=== ADCC World Submission Wrestling Championships ===
ADCC 2011

- Absolute: 2nd place
- -88 kg: 3rd place

ADCC 2009

- -77 kg: 1st place

ADCC 2007

- -77 kg: 2nd place

ADCC 2005

- -77 kg: 2nd place

=== CBJJ No-Gi World Championships ===
2012

- Black Belt 84 kg: Champion

2011

- Black Belt 84 kg: Finalist

2010

- Black Belt 84 kg: Champion
- Black Belt Absolute: Champion

2007

- Black Belt 79 kg: Champion

=== CBJJ No-Gi Pan American Championships ===
2012

- Black Belt 84 kg: 3rd Place
- Black Belt Absolute: Champion

2010

- Black Belt 84 kg: Champion
- Black Belt Absolute: Champion

2008

- Black Belt 84 kg: Champion

=== Grapplers Quest ===
2010

- Ufc expo Superfight : Champion

2009

- Pro All Star 84 kg: Champion
- South East Open Weight: Champion
- South East 84 kg: Champion

2007

- Pro All Star 84 kg: Champion

2004

- 5th Grapplers Quest West 84 kg: Champion
- Pro All Star 84 kg: Finalist

2003

- Pro All Star 84 kg: Champion

=== Copa América ===
2010

- No Gi Absolute: Champion
- Gi Absolute: Champion

=== VIC 3(Vivaceteam International Championship) ===
VIC 3-2010

- 74–84 kg: Champion
- Absolute: Champion

=== N.A.G.A ===
2007

- Advanced 84 kg: Champion

2005

- Superfight: Champion
- Superfight: champion

2004

- Superfight: Champion
- Superfight: Champion

2002

- Superfight: Champion

2001

- Superfight: Champion

2000

- Advanced 84 kg: champion

=== Pro Jiu-Jitsu Championship ===
2009

- Black Belt 84 kg: Champion

=== Atlantic Cup ===
- Superfight: Champion

=== NE Grappling Challenge III ===
- Pro Division 84 kg: Champion

=== Texas Submission Championship ===
- Pro Division 84 kg: Champion

=== Casca Grossa Championship ===
- Pro Division 84 kg: Champion

=== Music City Submission Championship ===
- Pro Division 84 kg: Champion

=== FFC Grappling Open ===
- Pro Division 84 kg: Champion

=== World Extreme Shoot Challenge ===
- XII Superfight: champion
- XI Superfight: Champion

=== Sport Combat championships II ===
- Pro Division 84 kg: Champion

== Submission grappling record ==
| Result | Opponent | Method | Event | Date | Round | Time | Notes |
|---|---|---|---|---|---|---|---|
| Win | Marcel Golcalves | Toe hold | MMA Expo (Absolute Division) | 2012 | | | Final round, wins the MMA Expo Absolute Division |
| Win | Ricardo Rezende | Foot Lock | MMA Expo (Absolute Division) | 2012 | | | Semi-finals |
| Win | Yury Villafort | Arm Bar | MMA Expo (Absolute Division) | 2012 | | | Opening round |
| Win | Romulo Barral | Points | World No-Gi Championship (-84 kg Division) | 2012 | | | Finals, 2012 World No gi Champion |
| Loss | Ezra Lenon | Points | World No-Gi Championship (-84 kg Division) | 2012 | | | Semi-finals |
| Win | Augusto Antunes | Points | World No-Gi Championship (-84 kg Division) | 2012 | | | Opening round |
| Win | Lucas Lepri | Points | Pan Jiu-Jitsu No-Gi Championship (Absolute Division) | 2012 | | | Finals, 2012 Pan Am No Gi Absolute Champion |
| Win | Diego Pereira de Santana | Points | Pan Jiu-Jitsu No-Gi Championship (Absolute Division) | 2012 | | | Semi-finals |
| Win | Oliver Geeddes | Submission | Pan Jiu-Jitsu No-Gi Championship (Absolute Division) | 2012 | | | Opening round |
| Loss | Andre Galvao | Toe Hold | ADCC 2011 (Absolute Division) | 2011 | | | Finals, 2011 ADCC Absolute Second Place |
| Win | Xande Ribeiro | Judges Decision | ADCC 2011 (Absolute Division) | 2011 | | | Semi-finals |
| Win | Victor Estima | Points | ADCC 2011 (Absolute Division) | 2011 | | | Quarter-finals |
| Win | Janne-Pekka | Points | ADCC 2011 (Absolute Division) | 2011 | | | Opening round |
| Win | Rafael Lovato Jr. | Points | ADCC 2011 (-88 kg Division) | 2011 | | | Bronze medal match |
| Loss | Andre Galvao | Points | ADCC 2011 (-88 kg Division) | 2011 | | | Semi-finals |
| Win | Sergio Moraes | Points | ADCC 2011 (-88 kg Division) | 2011 | | | Quarter-finals |
| Win | Zbigniew Tyszka | Points | ADCC 2011 (-88 kg Division) | 2011 | | | Opening round |
| Win | Flavio Almeida | Points | World No Gi championship (Absolute Division) | 2010 | | | Wins the 2010 World No Gi Absolute(Closed Division w Team Mate Roberto" Cyborg" Abreu and Marcus Buchecha) |
| Win | Ben Baxter | Submission Rear Naked Choke | World No Gi championship (Absolute Division) | 2010 | | | |
| Win | Daniel Moraes | Points(6-0) | World No Gi championship (Medium Heavyweight Division) | 2010 | | | Wins the 2010 World No Gi Championship |
| Win | Murilo Santana | Points | World No Gi championship | 2010 | | | |
| Win | Eduardo Milioli "Duda" | Points | World No Gi championship | 2010 | | | |
| Win | Steve Ramos | Submission Kimura | Copa América (No Gi Absolute Division) | 2010 | | | Wins the 2010 Copa América No Gi Absolute (Closed Division w Team Mate Vagner Rocha) |
| Win | Roger Kessler | Submission Kimura | Copa América (No Gi Absolute Division) | 2010 | | | |
| Win | Roger Kessler | Submission Kimura | Copa América (Gi Absolute Division) | 2010 | | | Wins the 2010 Copa América Gi Absolute (Closed Division w Team Mate Vagner Rocha) |
| Win | Caio Terra | Submission Rear Naked Choke | Pan American Jiu-Jitsu Championship (Absolute Division) | 2010 | | | Wins the 2010 Pan American Jiu-Jitsu |
| Win | Marcelo Pereira | Submission Kimura | Pan American Jiu-Jitsu Championship (Absolute Division) | 2010 | | | |
| Win | Leonardo Ferreira | Submission Kimura | Pan American Jiu-Jitsu Championship (Medium Heavyweight Division) | 2010 | | | Wins the 2010 Pan American Jiu-Jitsu |
| Win | Nakapan Phungephorn | Points(4-0) | Pan American Jiu-Jitsu Championship (Medium Heavyweight Division) | 2010 | | | |
| Win | Lucas Lepri | Points(2-0) | Grapplers Quest Ufc Superfight (Middleweight Division) | 2010 | | | Wins Superfight |
| Win | Baki Mir | Submission Kimura | Vic 3 (Middleweight Division) | 2010 | | | Wins Vic 3 84 kg |
| Win | Benaissa Au | Submission Kimura | Vic 3 (Middleweight Division) | 2010 | | | |
| Win | Thomas Loubersanes | | Vic 3 (Middleweight Division) | 2010 | | | |
| Win | N/A | Points | Vic 3 (Middleweight Division) | 2010 | | | |
| Win | Marcelo Garcia | Points (3-2) | ADCC Submission Wrestling World Championship (Middleweight Division) | 2009 | | | Wins the ADCC |
| Win | Gregor Gracie | Points (3-0) | ADCC Submission Wrestling World Championship (Middleweight Division) | 2009 | | | |
| Win | Ben Askren | Submission Footlock | ADCC Submission Wrestling World Championship (Middleweight Division) | 2009 | | | |
| Win | Don Ortega | Submission Rear naked Choke | ADCC Submission Wrestling World Championship (Middleweight Division) | 2009 | | | |
| Win | Sam Mccoy | Points (11-0) | Grapplers Quest (Open Division) | 2009 | | | Wins the Grapplers Quest |
| Win | Robby D'Onoforio | Submission Mount Choke | Grapplers Quest (Open Division) | 2009 | | | |
| Win | Tom Manelski | Points (8-0) | Grapplers Quest (Middleweight Division) | 2009 | | | Wins the Grapplers Quest |
| Win | Jorge Patino | Points (8-0) | Grapplers Quest (Middleweight Division) | 2009 | | | |
| Win | Jo Jo Guarin | Submission Rear Naked Choke | Grapplers Quest (Middleweight Division) | 2009 | | | |
| Win | Lucas Lepri | Advantage | Pro Jiu-Jitsu Championship (Middleweight Division) | 2009 | | | Wins the Pro Jiu-Jitsu |
| Win | Jorge Patino | Submission Rear naked Choke | Pro Jiu-Jitsu Championship (Middleweight Division) | 2009 | | | |
| Win | Derek Leyrer | Points | Pro Jiu-Jitsu Championship (Middleweight Division) | 2009 | | | |
| Win | Tarsis Humphries | Points (2-0) | Pan American Jiu-Jitsu Championship (Medium Heavyweight Division) | 2008 | | | Wins the 2008 Pan American Jiu-Jitsu |
| Win | Mike Jaramillo | Points (26-0) | Pan American Jiu-Jitsu Championship (Medium Heavyweight Division) | 2008 | | | |
| Win | Daniel Moraes | Points (2-0) | World Jiu-Jitsu Championship (Middleweight Division) | 2007 | | | Wins the 2007 World Jiu-Jitsu Championship |
| Win | Lucas Leite | Points (12-2) | World Jiu-Jitsu Championship (Middleweight Division) | 2007 | | | |
| Win | Eder Persiliano | Submission Rear naked Choke | World Jiu-Jitsu Championship (Middleweight Division) | 2007 | | | |
| Loss | Marcelo Garcia | North South Choke | ADCC Submission Wrestling World Championship (Middleweight Division) | 2007 | | | 2007 ADCC Finalist |
| Win | Andre Galvao | Points (6-1) | ADCC Submission Wrestling World Championship (Middleweight Division) | 2007 | | | |
| Win | Daisuke Sugie | Submission Mount Choke | ADCC Submission Wrestling World Championship (Middleweight Division) | 2007 | | | |
| Win | Eric Dahberg | Points (8-0) | ADCC Submission Wrestling World Championship (Middleweight Division) | 2007 | | | |
| Win | Saulo Ribeiro | Points (2-0) | Grapplers Quest (Middleweight Division) | 2007 | | | Wins The Grapplers Quest |
| Win | Sean Splanger | Points (2-0) | Grapplers Quest (Middleweight Division) | 2007 | | | |
| Win | Gary Grate | Points (5-0) | Grapplers Quest (Middleweight Division) | 2007 | | | |
| Win | Manoel Soares | Submission Rear Naked Choke | N.A.G.A (Middleweight Division) | 2007 | | | Wins the N.A.G.A |
| Win | Jason Keaton | Submission Mount Choke | Atlantic Cup Superfight (Middleweight Division) | 2007 | | | Wins the Superfight |
| Loss | Marcelo Garcia | Wrist Lock | ADCC Submission Wrestling World Championship (Middleweight Division) | 2005 | | | 2005 ADCC Finalist |
| Win | Jake Shields | Points (5-0) | ADCC Submission Wrestling World Championship (Middleweight Division) | 2005 | | | |
| Win | Roan Carneiro | Points (2-0) | ADCC Submission Wrestling World Championship (Middleweight Division) | 2005 | | | |
| Win | Renzo Gracie | Points (4-0) | ADCC Submission Wrestling World Championship (Middleweight Division) | 2005 | | | |
| Win | Luke Rineheart | Points (8-0) | Naga Superfight (Middleweight Division) | 2005 | | | Wins the Superfight |
| Win | Steven Haigh | Kimura | NE Grappling Challenge III (Middleweight Division) | 2005 | | | Wins NE Grappling Challenge III |
| Win | Andrew Smith | Kimura | NE Grappling Challenge III (Middleweight Division) | 2005 | | | |
| Win | Len Sonia | Points (10-0) | NE Grappling Challenge III (Middleweight Division) | 2005 | | | |
| Win | Marcus Avellan | Submission Rear naked Choke | Grapplers Quest (Middleweight Division) | 2004 | | | Wins The Grapplers Quest |
| Win | Jake Shields | Points (11-0) | Grapplers Quest (Middleweight Division) | 2004 | | | |
| Win | Alex Crispim | Points (4-0) | Grapplers Quest (Middleweight Division) | 2004 | | | |
| Win | Marcus Avellan | Points (14-0) | Naga Superfight (Middleweight Division) | 2004 | | | Wins the Superfight |
| Win | Tyrone Glover | Points (4-0) | Naga Superfight (Middleweight Division) | 2004 | | | Wins The Superfight |
| Win | Diego Sanchez | Points (6-0) | Texas Submission Open (Middleweight Division) | 2004 | | | Wins the Texas Submission Open |
| Loss | Diego Sanchez | Advantage | Grapplers Quest (Middleweight Division) | 2004 | | | Finalist of the 2004 Grapplers Quest |
| Win | Rob Kahn | Points (15-0) | Grapplers Quest (Middleweight Division) | 2004 | | | |
| Win | Tony Torres Aponte | Submission Kimura | Grapplers Quest (Middleweight Division) | 2004 | | | |
| Win | Efrain Ruiz | Points (4-0) | Casca Grossa Submission Championship (Middleweight Division) | 2004 | | | Wins The Casca Grossa |
| Win | Steve Headden | Points (4-0) | Casca Grossa Submission Championship (Middleweight Division) | 2004 | | | |
| Win | Nakapan Phungephorn | Points (5-0) | Grapplers Quest (Middleweight Division) | 2003 | | | Wins The Grapplers Quest |
| Win | Kenny Florian | Points (2-0) | Grapplers Quest (Middleweight Division) | 2003 | | | |
| Win | Anthony Tolone | Points (4-0) | Grapplers Quest (Middleweight Division) | 2003 | | | |
| Loss | Vítor Ribeiro | Advantage | ADCC Submission Wrestling World Championship (Middleweight Division) | 2003 | | | |
| Win | Marcio Feitosa | Points (4-0) | ADCC Submission Wrestling World Championship (Middleweight Division) | 2003 | | | |
| Win | Antonio McKee | Points (1-0) | North American ADCC Submission Wrestling World Championship (Middleweight Division) | 2003 | | | Wins The ADCC Trials |
| Win | Shawn Williams | Points (5-0) | North American ADCC Submission Wrestling World Championship (Middleweight Division) | 2003 | | | |
| Win | Sean Spangler | Submission Knee Bar | North American ADCC Submission Wrestling World Championship (Middleweight Division) | 2003 | | | |
| Win | Alex Crispim | Submission Kimura | Music City Submission Championship (Middleweight Division) | 2003 | | | Wins the Music City Championship |
| Win | Steve Headden | Points (8-0) | Music City Submission Championship (Middleweight Division) | 2003 | | | |
| Win | Nakapan Phungephorn | Points (5-0) | N.A.G.A Superfight (Middleweight Division) | 2003 | | | |
| Win | Shanne Dunn | Points (12-2) | FFBJJ Florida State Jiu-Jitsu Championship (Middleweight Division) | 2001 | | | Wins The FCC |
| Win | Hermes França | Submission Kimura | FFBJJ Florida State Jiu-Jitsu Championship (Middleweight Division) | 2001 | | | |
| Win | Mat Santos | Submission Arm Bar | N.A.G.A Superfight (Middleweight Division | 2000 | | | Wins the Superfight |
| Win | Efrain Ruiz | Submission Arm Bar | SPORT COMBAT CHAMPIONSHIPS II | 1999 | | | Wins the KWA |
| Win | Bernardo Magalhães | Submission Arm Bar | SPORT COMBAT CHAMPIONSHIPS II | 1999 | | | |

== Mixed martial arts record ==
Professional record breakdown
| 1 match | 1 win | 0 losses |
| By knockout | 0 | 0 |
| By submission | 1 | 0 |
| By decision | 0 | 0 |
| Draws | 0 | |
| No contests | 0 | |

| Date | Result | Record | Opponent | Event | Method | Round | Time | Location | Notes |
| 6/04/2010 | Win | 1-0 | Jeff Savoy | Rock and Rumble 3 | Submission (punches) | 2 | 3:32 | Hollywood, Florida | |
