= Marcelo Garcia (grappler) =

Brazilian martial artist

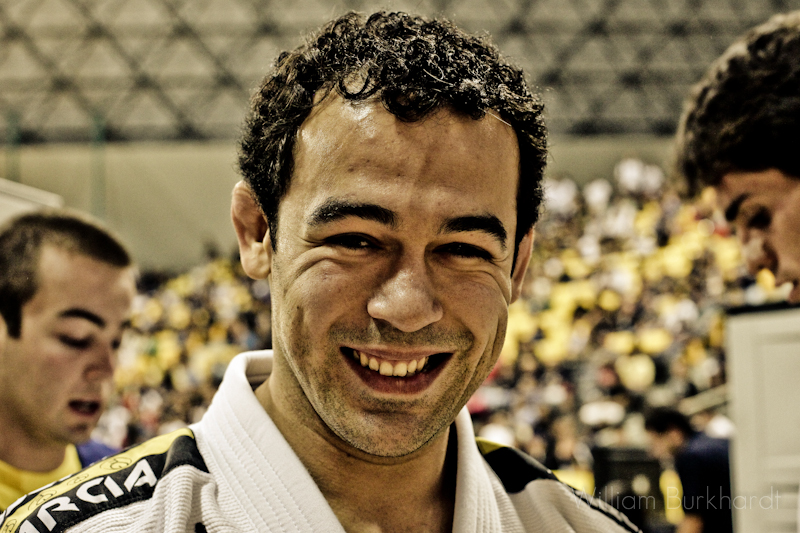
- Garcia at the 2011 World Jiu-Jitsu Championship
- Born: January 17, 1982 (age 44); Formiga, Minas Gerais, Brazil
- Other names: Marcelinho
- Team: Alliance Jiu Jitsu
- Rank: 5th deg. BJJ black belt (under Fabio Gurgel)

Other information
- Occupation: Brazilian jiu-jitsu instructor and coach
- Website: Marcelo Garcia Academy
- Mixed martial arts record from Sherdog

Marcelo Garcia (born January 17, 1983) is a Brazilian submission grappler, a 5th degree black belt Brazilian jiu-jitsu practitioner and coach. A highly decorated competitor, Garcia is widely considered to be one of the greatest submission grapplers of all time, and one of the pound for pound greatest of his era. Holding 5 World Jiu-Jitsu Championship and 4 ADCC Submission Fighting World Championship titles, Garcia is a member of the IBJJF Hall of Fame and the third BJJ athlete to be inducted into the ADCC Hall of Fame.

Marcelo is widely known for his innovation of various techniques such as X-Guard, arm-drags and high wrist guillotines which became popular following his success in high level completion, influencing the grappling world for the years following.

== Early life ==
Marcelo Garcia was born on 17 January 1983 in Formiga, Minas Gerais a small city in southeast Brazil. Garcia won the World Championships at all belt levels (blue, purple, brown) before receiving his black belt from Fabio Gurgel who he trained with in Sao Paulo, Brazil.

== Career ==
At K-1 HERO'S Korea 2007, Garcia made his MMA debut. He lost this against Dae Won Kim twenty seconds into the second round by doctor's stoppage, due to a cut above his eye. In September 2008, Garcia opened up a Brazilian Jiu-Jitsu school in Pembroke Pines, a city in South Florida located between Miami and Fort Lauderdale. In September 2009, Garcia opened an academy in Manhattan, New York City. In November 2011, Garcia retired from competition, that same year he became the third person to be inducted into the ADCC Hall of Fame as a result of his record-setting four gold medals in his own weight division and his performances in the absolute division.

Garcia later opened the first Marcelo Garcia academy in Hawaii in 2024.

=== Return ===
Garcia announced on November 11, 2024 that he had signed an exclusive contract with ONE Championship to make his return to professional grappling at one of their events.

Garcia competed against Masakazu Imanari at ONE 170 on January 24, 2025. He won the match by submission with a north-south choke.

== Health ==
On January 19, 2023, Garcia revealed that he had been diagnosed with stomach cancer and would undergo chemotherapy and surgery to remove the tumour. After months of treatment and a successful surgery, Garcia had made a recovery.

== Instructor lineage ==
Mitsuyo "Count Koma" Maeda → Carlos Gracie Sr. → Helio Gracie → Rolls Gracie → Romero "Jacare" Cavalcanti → Fabio Gurgel → Marcelo Garcia

== Championships and accomplishments ==
Garcia has won five world championship titles in Brazilian jiu-jitsu as a black belt in the middle-weight category. He has many submission grappling titles, including the ADCC Submission Wrestling World Championship. At ADCC, Garcia has won the 66–76 kg division four times (2003/2005/2007/2011), been awarded the most technical fighter twice (2003 and 2007) and won the best fight award in 2005. In 2005, he finished in third place in the absolute (open weight) division and in 2007 finished second in the absolute division. In ADCC 2009, Garcia finished second in his weight division, losing by points to Pablo Popovitch, whom he had defeated in the two previous finals.

=== Grappling ===
2011

- (gold) ADCC World Championship (-77 kg)
- (gold) IBJJF World Championship (-82 kg)

2010

- (gold) IBJJF World Championship (-82 kg)

2009

- (silver) ADCC World Championship (-77 kg)
- (gold) IBJJF World Championship (-82 kg)
- (bronze) ACBJJ World Cup (Absolute)
- (silver) ACBJJ World Cup (-75 kg)

2007

- (silver) ADCC World Championship (Absolute)
- (gold) ADCC World Championship (-77 kg)
- (gold) Grapplers Quest: Beast of the East (Superfight Tournament)
- (gold) IBJJF Pan American Championship (-82 kg)

2006

- (gold) PSL: X-Mission Superfight Winner
- (bronze) IBJJF World Championship (Absolute)
- (gold) IBJJF World Championship (-82 kg)
- (gold) PSL: LA-Sub Superfight Winner
- (gold) CBJJ Brazilian National Championship (Absolute)
- (gold) CBJJ Brazilian National Championship (-82 kg)

2005

- (gold) Arnold Gracie Pro
- (bronze) ADCC World Championship (Absolute)
- (gold) ADCC World Championship (-77 kg)

2004

- (gold) Arnold Gracie Pro
- (bronze) IBJJF World Championship (Absolute)
- (gold) IBJJF World Championship (-82 kg)
- (silver) CBJJ Brazilian National Championship (Absolute)
- (gold) CBJJ Brazilian National Championship (-82 kg)
- (gold) Campos Submission Wrestling 3 (Absolute)
- (gold) Campos Submission Wrestling 3 (-88 kg)

2003

- (gold) ADCC World Championship (-77 kg)
- (silver) IBJJF World Championship (-82 kg)

== Grappling record ==
91 Matches, 80 Wins (59 Submissions), 12 Losses (7 Submissions)
Result	Rec.	Opponent	Method	Event	Division	Type	Date	Location
Loss	81–12	(Australia) Lachlan Giles	Submission (kneebar)	ONE Fight Night 38		No-Gi	December 6, 2025	(Thailand) Bangkok
Win	81–11	(Japan) Masakazu Imanari	Submission (North-South Choke)	ONE 170		No-Gi	January 25, 2025	(Thailand) Bangkok
Win	80–11	(Brazil) Leo Vieira	Submission (triangle choke)	ADCC 2011	–77 kg	Nogi	September 25, 2011	(United Kingdom) Nottingham
Win	79–11	(Brazil) Kron Gracie	Points (2–0)	ADCC 2011	–77 kg	Nogi	September 25, 2011	(United Kingdom) Nottingham
Win	78–11	(Brazil) Victor Estima	Submission (guillotine choke)	ADCC 2011	–77 kg	Nogi	September 24, 2011	(United Kingdom) Nottingham
Win	77–11	(Australia) David Hart	Submission (guillotine choke)	ADCC 2011	–77 kg	Nogi	September 24, 2011	(United Kingdom) Nottingham
Win	76–11	(Brazil) Lucas Leite	Points (2–0)	World Jiu-Jitsu Championship	–82 kg	Gi	June 5, 2011	(United States) Long Beach, CA
Win	75–11	(Brazil) Gustavo Campos	Submission (armbar)	World Jiu-Jitsu Championship	–82 kg	Gi	June 5, 2011	(United States) Long Beach, CA
Win	74–11	(Brazil) Victor Estima	Points (3–0)	World Jiu-Jitsu Championship	–82 kg	Gi	June 5, 2011	(United States) Long Beach, CA
Win	73–11	(Brazil) Vitor Henrique	Injury	World Jiu-Jitsu Championship	–82 kg	Gi	June 4, 2011	(United States) Long Beach, CA
Win	72-11	(Brazil) Rylan Lizares	Points (5–0)	World Jiu-Jitsu Championship	–82 kg	Gi	June 4, 2011	(United States) Long Beach, CA
Win	71–11	(Brazil) Claudio Calasans	Points (2–0)	World Jiu-Jitsu Championship	–82 kg	Gi	June 6, 2010	(United States) Long Beach, CA
Win	70–11	(Brazil) Kayron Gracie	Points (5–0)	World Jiu-Jitsu Championship	–82 kg	Gi	June 6, 2010	(United States) Long Beach, CA
Win	69–11	(Brazil) Murilo Santana	Points (8–2)	World Jiu-Jitsu Championship	–82 kg	Gi	June 6, 2010	(United States) Long Beach, CA
Win	68-11	(Brazil) Bruno Alves	Submission (north/south choke)	World Jiu-Jitsu Championship	–82 kg	Gi	June 5, 2010	(United States) Long Beach, CA
Win	67-11	(Brazil) Chico Mendes	Submission (north/south choke)	World Jiu-Jitsu Championship	–82 kg	Gi	June 5, 2010	(United States) Long Beach, CA
Win	66–11	(Brazil) Lucas Leite	Points (6-0)	World Jiu-Jitsu Championship	–82 kg	Gi	June, 2009	(United States) Long Beach, CA
Loss	65–11	(Brazil) Braulio Estima	Submission (arm-in rear naked choke)	ADCC 2009	Absolute	Nogi	September 27, 2009	(Spain) Barcelona
Win	65–10	(Brazil) Bruno Bastos	Submission (rear naked choke)	ADCC 2009	Absolute	Nogi	September 27, 2009	(Spain) Barcelona
Loss	64–10	(Brazil) Pablo Popovitch	Points (1–3)	ADCC 2009	–77 kg	Nogi	September 27, 2009	(Spain) Barcelona
Win	64–9	(Japan) K-Taro Nakamura	Submission (guillotine choke)	ADCC 2009	–77 kg	Nogi	September 27, 2009	(Spain) Barcelona
Win	63–9	(Brazil) Kron Gracie	Submission (guillotine choke)	ADCC 2009	–77 kg	Nogi	September 26, 2009	(Spain) Barcelona
Win	62–9	(Australia) Rodney Ellis	Submission (guillotine choke)	ADCC 2009	–77 kg	Nogi	September 26, 2009	(Spain) Barcelona
Win	61–9	(Brazil) Lucas Leite	Points (6–0)	World Jiu-Jitsu Championship	–82 kg	Gi	May 31, 2009	(United States) Long Beach, CA
Win	60–9	(Brazil) Tiago Alves	Advantages (4–2)	World Jiu-Jitsu Championship	–82 kg	Gi	May 31, 2009	(United States) Long Beach, CA
Win	59–9	(Norway) Nik Ruben Nikolaisen	Submission (choke)	World Jiu-Jitsu Championship	–82 kg	Gi	May 30, 2009	(United States) Long Beach, CA
Loss	58–9	(Brazil) Braulio Estima	Submission (triangle choke)	World Professional Jiu-Jitsu Cup	Absolute	Gi	2009	(United Arab Emirates) Abu Dhabi
Win	58–8	(Brazil) Victor Estima	Submission (choke)	World Professional Jiu-Jitsu Cup	Absolute	Gi	2009	(United Arab Emirates) Abu Dhabi
Win	57–8	(Brazil) Eduardo Santoro	Points	World Professional Jiu-Jitsu Cup	Absolute	Gi	2009	(United Arab Emirates) Abu Dhabi
Win	56–8	(Brazil) Elmoutti Azedine	Submission (choke)	World Professional Jiu-Jitsu Cup	Absolute	Gi	2009	(United Arab Emirates) Abu Dhabi
Loss	55–8	(Brazil) Michael Langhi	Points (advantage)	World Professional Jiu-Jitsu Cup	–75 kg	Gi	2009	(United Arab Emirates) Abu Dhabi
Win	55–7	(Brazil) Michel Maia	Submission (rear naked choke)	World Professional Jiu-Jitsu Cup	–75 kg	Gi	2009	(United Arab Emirates) Abu Dhabi
Loss	54–7	(United States) Robert Drysdale	Submission (darce choke)	ADCC 2007	Absolute	Nogi	May 6, 2007	(United States) Trenton, NJ
Win	54–6	(Brazil) Alexandre Ferreira	Submission (rear naked choke)	ADCC 2007	Absolute	Nogi	May 6, 2007	(United States) Trenton, NJ
Win	53–6	(Brazil) Rolles Gracie	Verbal Submission (armlock)	ADCC 2007	Absolute	Nogi	May 6, 2007	(United States) Trenton, NJ
Win	52–6	(Brazil) Mario Miranda	Submission (north/south choke)	ADCC 2007	Absolute	Nogi	May 6, 2007	(United States) Trenton, NJ
Win	51–6	(Brazil) Pablo Popovitch	Submission (north/south choke)	ADCC 2007	–77 kg	Nogi	May 5, 2007	(United States) Trenton, NJ
Win	50–6	(United States) Mike Fowler	Submission (guillotine choke)	ADCC 2007	–77 kg	Nogi	May 5, 2007	(United States) Trenton, NJ
Win	49–6	(United States) Kurt Pellegrino	Submission (rear naked choke)	ADCC 2007	–77 kg	Nogi	May 4, 2007	(United States) Trenton, NJ
Win	48–6	(Australia) George Sotiropoulos	Submission (guillotine choke)	ADCC 2007	–77 kg	Nogi	May 4, 2007	(United States) Trenton, NJ
Win	47–6	(Brazil) Gregor Gracie	Submission (north/south choke)	Grapplers Quest	Superfight	Nogi	February 21, 2007	(United States) Trenton, NJ
Win	46–6	(United States) Marcos Avellan	Submission (rear naked choke)	Grapplers Quest	Superfight	Nogi	February 21, 2007	(United States) Trenton, NJ
Win	45–6	(Brazil) Edson Diniz	Submission (triangle armbar)	Grapplers Quest	Superfight	Nogi	February 21, 2007	(United States) Trenton, NJ
Win	44–6	(Brazil) Adriano Silva	Submission (armbar)	Pan American Championship	–82 kg	Gi	2007	(United States) Long Beach, CA
Win	43–6	(Brazil) Rodrigo Texieira	Submission (armlock)	Pan American Championship	–82 kg	Gi	2007	(United States) Long Beach, CA
Win	42–6	(United States) Jake Shields	Submission (guillotine choke)	PSL: X-Mission	Superfight	Nogi	November 17, 2006	(United States) Los Angeles, CA
Loss	41–6	(Brazil) Roger Gracie	Submission (choke)	World Jiu-Jitsu Championship	Absolute	Gi	2006	(Brazil) Rio de Janeiro
Win	41–5	(United States) Robert Drysdale	Points (3–0)	World Jiu-Jitsu Championship	Absolute	Gi	2006	(Brazil) Rio de Janeiro
Win	40–5	(Brazil) Thiago Gaia	Submission	World Jiu-Jitsu Championship	Absolute	Gi	2006	(Brazil) Rio de Janeiro
Win	39–5	(Brazil) Andre Galvao	Points (2–0)	World Jiu-Jitsu Championship	–82 kg	Gi	2006	(Brazil) Rio de Janeiro
Win	38–5	(Brazil) Daniel Moraes	Disqualification (stalling)	World Jiu-Jitsu Championship	–82 kg	Gi	2006	(Brazil) Rio de Janeiro
Win	37–5	(Brazil) Murilo Santana		World Jiu-Jitsu Championship	–82 kg	Gi	2006	(Brazil) Rio de Janeiro
Win	36–5	(United States) Cameron Earle	Submission (north/south choke)	PSL: LA Sub-X	Superfight	Nogi	May 26, 2006	(United States) Los Angeles, CA
Win	35–5	(Brazil) Demian Maia	Points	Brazilian National Championship	Absolute	Gi	2006	(Brazil) Rio de Janeiro
Win	34–5	(Brazil) Andre Galvao	Submission (Katahajime)	Brazilian National Championship	Absolute	Gi	2006	(Brazil) Rio de Janeiro
Win	33–5	(Brazil) Adriano Camolesi		Brazilian National Championship	Absolute	Gi	2006	(Brazil) Rio de Janeiro
Win	32–5	(Brazil) Roberto de Abreu		Brazilian National Championship	Absolute	Gi	2006	(Brazil) Rio de Janeiro
Win	31–5	(Brazil) Andre Galvao	Points (6–2)	Brazilian National Championship	–82 kg	Gi	2006	(Brazil) Rio de Janeiro
Win	30–5	(Brazil) Gustavo Campos		Brazilian National Championship	–82 kg	Gi	2006	(Brazil) Rio de Janeiro
Win	29–5	(Brazil) Alexandre Ribeiro	Submission (rear naked choke)	ADCC 2005	Absolute	Nogi	May 29, 2005	(United States) Long Beach, CA
Loss	28–5	(Brazil) Ronaldo Souza	Submission (kimura)	ADCC 2005	Absolute	Nogi	May 29, 2005	(United States) Long Beach, CA
Win	28–4	(United States) Diego Sanchez	Submission (armbar)	ADCC 2005	Absolute	Nogi	May 29, 2005	(United States) Long Beach, CA
Win	27–4	(United States) Ricco Rodriguez	Submission (heel hook)	ADCC 2005	Absolute	Nogi	May 29, 2005	(United States) Long Beach, CA
Win	26–4	(Brazil) Pablo Popovitch	Submission (wristlock)	ADCC 2005	–77 kg	Nogi	May 29, 2005	(United States) Long Beach, CA
Win	25–4	(Brazil) Leonardo Santos	Points	ADCC 2005	–77 kg	Nogi	May 29, 2005	(United States) Long Beach, CA
Win	24–4	(Japan) Shinya Aoki	Submission (rear naked choke)	ADCC 2005	–77 kg	Nogi	May 28, 2005	(United States) Long Beach, CA
Win	23–4	(United States) Chris Brennan	Technical Submission (injury)	ADCC 2005	–77 kg	Nogi	May 28, 2005	(United States) Long Beach, CA
Loss	22–4	(Brazil) Roger Gracie	Points (10–2)	World Jiu-Jitsu Championship	Absolute	Gi	2004	(Brazil) Rio de Janeiro
Win	22–3	(Brazil) Cássio Werneck	Points (9–0)	World Jiu-Jitsu Championship	Absolute	Gi	2004	(Brazil) Rio de Janeiro
Win	21–3	(Brazil) Flávio Serafim	Submission (choke)	World Jiu-Jitsu Championship	Absolute	Gi	2004	(Brazil) Rio de Janeiro
Loss	20–3	(Brazil) Alexandre Ribeiro	Points (6–0)	Brazilian National Championship	Absolute	Gi	2004	(Brazil) Rio de Janeiro
Win	20–2	(Brazil) Eric Vanderlei	Submission (rear naked choke)	Brazilian National Championship	Absolute	Gi	2004	(Brazil) Rio de Janeiro
Win	19–2	(Brazil) Marcio Corleta	Submission (choke)	Brazilian National Championship	Absolute	Gi	2004	(Brazil) Rio de Janeiro
Win	18–2	(Brazil) Flávio Serafim	Submission (armbar)	Brazilian National Championship	–82 kg	Gi	2004	(Brazil) Rio de Janeiro
Win	17–2	(Brazil) Felipe Simão		Brazilian National Championship	–82 kg	Gi	2004	(Brazil) Rio de Janeiro
Win	16–2	(Brazil) Fernando Paulon	Submission (choke)	Brazilian National Championship	–82 kg	Gi	2004	(Brazil) Rio de Janeiro
Win	15–2	(Brazil) Adriano Ribeiro	Submission (armbar)	Brazilian National Championship	–82 kg	Gi	2004	(Brazil) Rio de Janeiro
Win	14–2	(Brazil) Renato Sobral	Points (6–0)	Campos Submission Wrestling 3	Absolute	Nogi	2004	(Brazil) Campos
Win	13–2	(Brazil) Gabriel Gonzaga	Points (4–0)	Campos Submission Wrestling 3	Absolute	Nogi	2004	(Brazil) Campos
Win	12–2	(Brazil) Marcos Oliveira	Submission (rear naked choke)	Campos Submission Wrestling 3	Absolute	Nogi	2004	(Brazil) Campos
Win	11–2	(Brazil) Thales Leites	Submission (rear naked choke)	Campos Submission Wrestling 3	–88 kg	Nogi	2004	(Brazil) Campos
Win	10–2	(Brazil) Bruno Bastos	Submission (rear naked choke)	Campos Submission Wrestling 3	–88 kg	Nogi	2004	(Brazil) Campos
Win	9–2	(Brazil) Leonardo Nascimento	Submission (armbar)	Campos Submission Wrestling 3	–88 kg	Nogi	2004	(Brazil) Campos
Loss	8–2	(Brazil) Fernando Augusto	Submission (triangle choke)	World Jiu-Jitsu Championship	–82 kg	Gi	2003	(Brazil) Rio de Janeiro
Win	8–1	(Brazil) Garcia Brito	Submission (rear naked choke)	World Jiu-Jitsu Championship	–82 kg	Gi	2003	(Brazil) Rio de Janeiro
Loss	7–1	(Brazil) Marcio Pe De Pano	Points (6–0)	ADCC 2003	Absolute	Nogi	May 18, 2003	(Brazil) São Paulo
Win	7–0	(United States) Mike Van Arsdale	Submission (rear naked choke)	ADCC 2003	Absolute	Nogi	May 18, 2003	(Brazil) São Paulo
Win	6–0	(Norway) Otto Olsen	Submission (rear naked choke)	ADCC 2003	–77 kg	Nogi	May 18, 2003	(Brazil) São Paulo
Win	5–0	(Brazil) Vítor Ribeiro	Submission (rear naked choke)	ADCC 2003	–77 kg	Nogi	May 18, 2003	(Brazil) São Paulo
Win	4–0	(Brazil) Renzo Gracie	Points (9–0)	ADCC 2003	–77 kg	Nogi	May 17, 2003	(Brazil) São Paulo
Win	3–0	(Japan) Kiuma Kunioku	Submission (rear naked choke	ADCC 2003	–77 kg	Nogi	May 17, 2003	(Brazil) São Paulo
Win	2–0	(Brazil) Fábio Negão Nascimento	Submission (rear naked choke)	Ubatuba	–77 kg	Nogi	2002	(Brazil) Ubatuba
Win	1–0	(Brazil) Adriano Pires	Submission (rear naked choke)	Ubatuba	–77 kg	Nogi	2002	(Brazil) Ubatuba

== Mixed martial arts record ==
Professional record breakdown
1 match	0 wins	1 loss
By knockout	0	1

Res.	Record	Opponent	Method	Event	Date	Round	Time	Location	Notes
Loss	0–1	Kim Dae-Won	TKO (cut)	Hero's 2007	October 28, 2007	2	0:20	Seoul, South Korea	

== See also ==
- AJ Agazarm
- Herbert Burns
- Hannette Staack
