= Gordon Ryan =

American martial artist (born 1995)

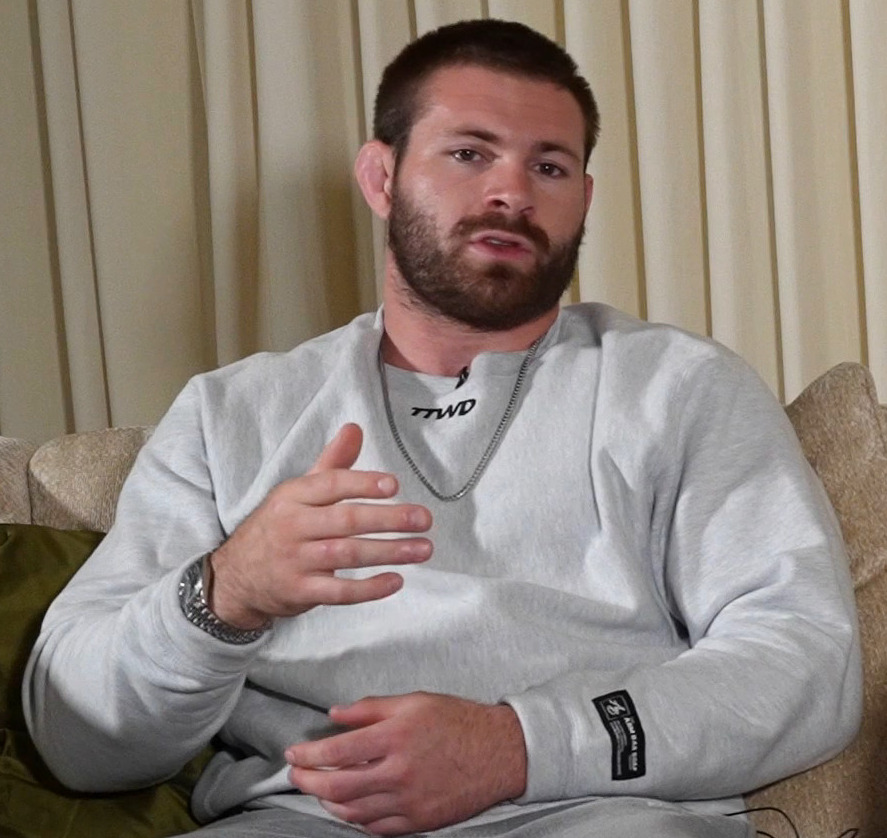
- Ryan in 2022
- Born: July 8, 1995 (age 31); Monroe Township, New Jersey, U.S.
- Other names: The King
- Height: 6 ft 2 in (1.88 m)
- Weight: 240 lb (110 kg)
- Division: Super-Heavyweight
- Reach: 77 in (196 cm)
- Team: New Wave Jiu Jitsu; Danaher Death Squad; Renzo Gracie Academy
- Rank: Black belt in Brazilian jiu-jitsu (Note: under Garry Tonon and John Danaher)

Gordon Ryan (born July 8, 1995) is a retired American submission wrestler and Brazilian jiu-jitsu black belt, considered by many to be the greatest no–gi grappler of all time due to his many accomplishments. Ryan is a seven-time ADCC Submission wrestling world champion, three-time IBJJF No-Gi World champion and a four-time Eddie Bravo Invitational champion.

== Early life ==
Gordon Ryan was born on July 8, 1995, in Monroe, New Jersey, U.S. He began grappling at the age of 15 under Miguel Benitez before switching to train under John Danaher, Tom DeBlass and Garry Tonon. He began competing and won the IBJJF World No-Gi Brazilian Jiu-Jitsu Championship as a brown belt. In 2015, he quit his job as a garbage collector to fully dedicate himself to his craft.

== Career ==
=== 2016 ===
After a 6-month brown belt run, where Ryan won notable tournaments such as the Newaza Challenge and the World Championship, Ryan was awarded his black belt by Garry Tonon in February 2016 in a ceremony supported by the presence of Tom deBlass, Ricardo Almeida and John Danaher – who shared the responsibility of the new belt rank.

On April 24, 2016, Ryan won the Eddie Bravo Invitational Championship, defeating world champion Yuri Simões and noted grappler Rustam Chsiev on the way. Ryan next faced top USA grappler Keenan Cornelius in a no time limit, submission only match where Ryan was able to upset Cornelius and submit him with a heel hook.

=== 2017 ===
In September 2017 Ryan competed at the ADCC World Championship. He took gold in the -88 kg weight category, defeating Dillon Danis, Romulo Barral, Xande Ribeiro and Keenan Cornelius. He also took 2nd place in the absolute division, submitting all his opponents on his way to losing to Felipe Pena in the final.

He would go on to win another EBI title and defeat Yuri Simões in a superfight at Kasai Pro to wrap up 2017.

=== 2018 ===
In September 2018, Ryan competed at the IBJJF Pan No-gi, winning both his weight class and the absolute division all by submission. Ryan led Team Alpha Male's victory in Quintet's 2018 Tournament, Quintet 3. Ryan's submission victories against Josh Barnett and Marcos Souza saw Team Alpha Male advance to the Finals. His submission victories against Craig Jones and Vítor Ribeiro earned his team's ultimate victory in the tournament. He also competed at the IBJJF Nogi Worlds in California, again taking gold in both his weight class and the absolute division.

=== 2019 ===
In 2019 Gordon Ryan competed in a superfight against Joao Gabriel Rocha at KASAI Super Series in Dallas, Texas. Gordon ultimately won the match, but during an exchange there was an entanglement where Gordon was attempting an entry for a heel hook and his knee popped multiple times and tore his LCL. This injury was expected to keep him out of competition for about 6 months.

In September 2019 it was reported that Gordon injured his hand in an accident with one of his motorized bikes, leaving him competing at ADCC with one hand heavily bandaged and injured. Despite the injury, he went on to win the -99 kg division. He beat Ben Hodgkinson, Tim Spriggs, Lucas Barbosa and Vinicius Ferreira. He would then move on the absolute division where he would claim gold following victories over Pedro Marinho, Garry Tonon, Lachlan Giles and Marcus Buchecha Almeida.

In a hybrid rules fight, Ryan submitted wrestler Bo Nickal via triangle choke.

=== 2020 ===
Ryan was forced to withdraw from a superfight set for July 31, 2020, after contracting COVID-19. On October 2, 2020, Ryan faced fellow ADCC 2019 World Champion Matheus Diniz and defeated him via heel hook approximately halfway through a thirty-minute submission-only match.

Ryan decided late in 2020 that he would leave the New Jersey area and move to Puerto Rico with his coach, John Danaher, and several members of his team to open up their own gym. He revealed in December 2020, that the new gym had a tentative opening date of March 2021.

=== 2021 ===
On March 22, 2021, ONE Championship Chairman and CEO Chatri Sityodtong confirmed that Ryan had signed a contract with the promotion to compete in grappling, as well as mixed martial arts if he wished to. He was scheduled to make his promotional debut in a grappling match against multiple–times ONE Lightweight World Champion (MMA) Shinya Aoki on August 27, 2021. Ryan announced on May 21 that he was at least momentarily retiring from competitive grappling due to his long–time gastroparesis condition, as it had worsened throughout the years, and looks forward to taking care of his health. As confirmed from sources, Gordon Ryan is no longer under One Championship contract.

In July 2021, it was announced that Danaher Death Squad had split up and Ryan will be opening his own academy in Austin, Texas.

=== 2022 ===
In September 2022, Gordon competed at ADCC both in the +99 kg division and in the superfight against André Galvão. It was the first time in the history of ADCC that a competitor that was scheduled to do the superfight also fought at a weight division. Gordon proceeded to clear his weight class with victories over Heikki Jussila, Victor Hugo, Roosevelt Sousa and Nick Rodriguez to win gold. He also had the fastest submission in the history of ADCC against Roosevelt Sousa, where he submitted Sousa via outside heel hook in 11 seconds. Later that weekend, Ryan faced Galvão in a highly anticipated match in grappling history and won via rear naked choke. Gordon became the first grappler in ADCC history to become champion in three different weight classes and he defeated André Galvão, who had not lost a match since 2017.

On December 15, 2022, Ryan was scheduled to compete against Vinny Magalhães in the main event of UFC Fight Pass Invitational 3. Magalhães withdrew from the event on short notice and was replaced by Ryan's former teammate Nick Rodriguez. Ryan went on to win the match by fastest escape time in EBI overtime.

Ryan published his first book "Top Game: Domination in the World of Jiu-Jitsu." His autobiography received mix reviews and was published by DartFrog Books.

=== 2023 ===
In January 2023, Ryan announced that he had signed a seven-figure multi-fight contract with FloSports.

The fourth bout between Ryan and Felipe Pena was originally scheduled on February 25, 2023, at Who's Number One. Just two days before the event, Ryan withdrew as a result of stomach issues that he suffered during the week leading up to the match and he was replaced by Nick Rodriguez. Ryan did not compete in the first half of 2023 and revealed on May 22 that this was because he suffered a serious case of strep throat that was resistant to penicillin and had to undergo a tonsillectomy.

Ryan announced that he would return to professional grappling competition on October 1, 2023 when he would defend his Who's Number One heavyweight title against Patrick Gaudio at WNO 20: Night of Champions. He won the match by submission via armbar, as predicted in his mystery box and retained his title.

Ryan was scheduled to defend his heavyweight title against Lucas Barbosa at Who's Number One 21: Ryan v Barbosa on November 30, 2023. Ryan withdrew from the match due to a rib injury and was replaced by his teammate Giancarlo Bodoni.

Ryan was also scheduled to compete against Mason Fowler in the main event of UFC Fight Pass Invitational 5 on December 9, 2023. He withdrew from this match due to rib injury too.

=== 2024 ===
Ryan competed against Josh Saunders in the main event of Who's Number One 24 on June 20, 2024. He won the match by submission.

Ryan competed against Yuri Simões in the traditional superfight at the 2024 ADCC World Championship, and also competed in a second superfight against Felipe Pena. Ryan won the first superfight against Pena 2–0 on points, and won the second superfight against Simoes 21–0 on points.

== Personal life ==
Ryan is the older brother of submission wrestler Nicky Ryan.

He is in a relationship with Nathalia Santoro, one of his training partners and a BJJ brown belt under John Danaher.

Ryan reported suffering from an undiagnosed stomach condition for several years until April 2019, when he was diagnosed with Gastroparesis. This diagnosis was later shown to be incorrect, and he was suffering from a Helicobacter Pylori infection, as well as a fungal growth in his small intestine and a bacterial imbalance. Minor illnesses that he suffered later in his life have caused this issue to reoccur.

Ryan has trained with multiple martial artists, most noticeably UFC star Jon Jones, the former UFC heavyweight champion. They trained for a week in the summer of 2023, ahead of Jon Jones's bout with former heavyweight champion Stipe Miocic at UFC 295. Ryan shared on The Joe Rogan Experience that he trained with Lethwei champion Dave Leduc in New York City in November 2019. He also trained with strongman Hafthor Björnsson in December 2022.

== Controversy ==
Ryan has engaged in numerous public spats with other competitive grapplers, including an incident on October 13, 2020, when he revealed private conversations between himself and Felipe Pena regarding a potential third match between the pair. Shortly after this, on November 29, 2020, he also accused fellow ADCC 2019 medalist Lachlan Giles of using PEDs after the latter shared his opinion that those who have won medals while using PEDs should relinquish those titles. In January, 2021, Ryan also clashed with several key members of ATOS on social media, including founder and head coach Andre Galvao, ahead of their potential match at ADCC 2022.

After his teammate Craig Jones defeated Atos Jiu-Jitsu representative Ronaldo Junior at Who's Number One on February 26, 2021, Ryan attempted to shake hands with André Galvão but was sworn at and given the middle finger in return by Galvão. Galvão then confronted Ryan backstage and footage emerged of the two exchanging heated words. Galvão shoved Ryan, in return Ryan slapped Galvão twice and several of the event's competitors and staff intervened to calm the situation down. The public statement issued by Ryan after the incident expressed no remorse for it and instead, he chose to use the opportunity to direct further criticism towards both André Galvão and several members of the ATOS team.

Another incident involved him making what appeared to be sexual comments towards the young daughter of Erbeth Santos, after Santos had made comments regarding both Ryan's father and suggestive sexual comments toward his girlfriend. He has also been known for publicly challenging other Brazilian jiu-jitsu competitors by criticizing their ability, like AJ Agazarm and Dillon Danis.

Gordon Ryan has generated controversy for his social media activity which included potentially insensitive commentary on homeless individuals; he has been subject to allegations of racism and xenophobia.

== Championships and accomplishments ==
2022

- (gold) Jitsmagazine BJJ Awards 'Male Grappler of the Year (No Gi)
- (gold) ADCC 2022 World Championship (+99 kg)
- (gold) Best Athlete at ADCC 2022 World Championship
- (gold) Fastest Submission at ADCC 2022 World Championship

2020

- (gold) Grappling Industries: Arnold Classic (Absolute)

2019

- (gold) ADCC 2019 World Championship (Absolute)
- (gold) ADCC 2019 World Championship (–99 kg)
- (gold) Kinektic 1 (with Team BJJ Fanatics)

2018

- (gold) IBJJF Nogi World Championships (Black Belt Absolute)
- (gold) IBJJF Nogi World Championships (Black Belt +97.5 kg)
- (gold) Quintet 3 (with Team Alpha Male)
- (gold) IBJJF Pan Nogi (Black Belt Absolute)
- (gold) IBJJF Pan Nogi (Black Belt +97.5 kg)

2017

- (gold) Eddie Bravo Invitational 14 (Absolute)
- (silver) ADCC 2017 World Championship (Absolute)
- (gold) ADCC 2017 World Championship (–88 kg)
- (gold) Grappling Industries (Absolute)
- (gold) Eddie Bravo Invitational 11 (–170 lbs)
- (gold) Sapteiro 6 (Absolute)

2016

- (gold) Eddie Bravo Invitational 8 (–185 lbs)
- (gold) Eddie Bravo Invitational 6 (Absolute)
- (gold) Portland Sunday Open (Absolute)
- (gold) Goodfight Pro 2 (–77 kg)
- (gold) Sapteiro 1 (Absolute)
- (gold) Grappling Industries Montreal (Absolute)

2015

- (gold) Goodfight All-Star (–170 lbs)
- (gold) IBJJF Nogi World Championships (Brown Belt –73.5 kg)
- (gold) Newaza Challenge (Absolute)
- (gold) Grapplers Quest: All-Star (–185 lbs)
- (gold) Kumite Classic (Absolute)
- (gold) Kumite Classic (–185 lbs)
- (silver) ADCC North American Championship (–88 kg)
- (gold) NAGA World Championship (Gi Purple Belt –170 lbs)
- (gold) NAGA World Championship (Expert Nogi –170 lbs)

2014

- (bronze) ADCC North American Championship (–88 kg)
- (gold) PGL IV (–155 lbs)

2013

- (silver) AGL 4 (Absolute)
- (gold) AGL 4 (–155 lbs)

2012

- (gold) Grapplers Quest: World Championship (Beginner –160 lbs)
- (gold) Grapplers Quest: Beast from the East (Teen Gi –170 lbs)
- (gold) Grapplers Quest: Beast from the East (Teen Nogi –170 lbs)

2011

- (gold) Grapplers Quest: World Championship (Teen –170 lbs)

== Submission grappling record ==
Professional record breakdown
169 matches	157 wins	9 losses
By submission	130	1
By decision	25	8
By disqualification	2	0
Draws	3	

Result	Record	Opponent	Method	Event	Division	Type	Date	Location
Win	157–9–3	(Brazil) Yuri Simões	Points (21–0)	ADCC 2024	Superfight	Nogi	August 18, 2024	(United States) Las Vegas, NV
Win	156–9–3	(Brazil) Felipe Pena	Points (2–0)	ADCC 2024	Superfight	Nogi	August 17, 2024	(United States) Las Vegas, NV
Win	155–9–3	(Australia) Josh Saunders	Submission (heel hook)	Who's Number One	Superfight	Nogi	June 20, 2024	(United States) Austin, TX
Win	154–9–3	(Brazil) Patrick Gaudio	Submission (armbar)	Who's Number One	Superfight	Nogi	October 1, 2023	(United States) Houston, TX
Win	153–9–3	(United States) Nick Rodriguez	Fastest Escape Time	UFC Fight Pass Invitational 3	Superfight	Nogi	December 15, 2022	(United States) Las Vegas, NV
Win	152–9–3	(Brazil) André Galvão	Submission (rear naked choke)	ADCC 2022	Superfight	Nogi	September 18, 2022	(United States) Las Vegas, NV
Win	151–9–3	(United States) Nick Rodriguez	Submission (heel hook)	ADCC 2022	+99 kg	Nogi	September 18, 2022	(United States) Las Vegas, NV
Win	150–9–3	(Brazil) Roosevelt Souza	Submission (heel hook)	ADCC 2022	+99 kg	Nogi	September 18, 2022	(United States) Las Vegas, NV
Win	149–9–3	(Brazil) Victor Hugo	Points (8–0)	ADCC 2022	+99 kg	Nogi	September 17, 2022	(United States) Las Vegas, NV
Win	148–9–3	(Finland) Heikki Jussila	Submission (rear naked choke)	ADCC 2022	+99 kg	Nogi	September 17, 2022	(United States) Las Vegas, NV
Win	147–9–3	(Brazil) Felipe Pena	Technical Submission (forfeit)	Who's Number One	Superfight	Nogi	August 7, 2022	(United States) Frisco, TX
Win	146–9–3	(Brazil) Pedro Marinho	Submission (rear naked choke)	Who's Number One	Superfight	Nogi	July 14, 2022	(United States) Austin, TX
Win	145–9–3	(United States) Jacob Couch	Submission (pressure)	Who's Number One	Superfight	Nogi	March 25, 2022	(United States) Frisco, TX
Win	144–9–3	(Brazil) Vagner Rocha	Submission (reverse triangle choke)	Who's Number One	Superfight	Nogi	March 26, 2021	(United States) Austin, TX
Win	143–9–3	(Ecuador) Roberto Jimenez	Submission (armbar)	Who's Number One	Superfight	Nogi	February 26, 2021	(United States) Austin, TX
Win	142–9–3	(Brazil) Matheus Diniz	Submission (heel hook)	Who's Number One	Superfight	Nogi	October 2, 2020	(United States) Austin, TX
Win	141–9–3	(United States) Brian Marvin	Submission (rear naked choke)	3rd Coast Grappling: Kumite IV	Superfight	Nogi	July 11, 2020	(United States) Dallas, TX
Win	140–9–3	(United States) Kyle Boehm	Submission (crooked armbar)	Who's Number One	Superfight	Nogi	June 5, 2020	(United States) Beverly, MA
Win	139–9–3	(United States) David Newton	Submission (rear naked choke)	Grappling Industries: Arnold Classic	Absolute	Nogi	March 7, 2020	(United States) Columbus, OH
Win	138–9–3	(United States) Abraham Hall	Submission (side triangle)	Grappling Industries: Arnold Classic	Absolute	Nogi	March 7, 2020	(United States) Columbus, OH
Win	137–9–3	(United States) Benjamin Dixon	Submission (rear naked choke)	Grappling Industries: Arnold Classic	Absolute	Nogi	March 7, 2020	(United States) Columbus, OH
Win	136–9–3	(United States) Chad Allen	Submission (arm-bar)	Grappling Industries: Arnold Classic	Absolute	Nogi	March 7, 2020	(United States) Columbus, OH
Win	135–9–3	(United States) Austin Tracy	Submission (rear naked choke)	Grappling Industries: Arnold Classic	Absolute	Nogi	March 7, 2020	(United States) Columbus, OH
Win	134–9–3	(United States) Pat Downey	Submission (power half nelson)	BJJ Fanatics	Superfight	Nogi	February 29, 2020	(United States) Beverly, MA
Win	133–9–3	(United States) Aaron Johnson	Submission (arm-triangle choke)	Sub Stars	Superfight	Nogi	February 21, 2020	(United States) Miami, FL
Win	132–9–3	(Brazil) Gabriel Gonzaga	Submission (heel hook)	Submission Underground 10	Superfight	Nogi	December 22, 2019	(United States) Portland, OR
Win	131–9–3	(Russia) Aleksei Oleinik	Submission (kneebar)	Quintet Ultra	Superfight	Nogi	December 12, 2019	(United States) Las Vegas, NV
Win	130–9–3	(United States) Bo Nickal	Submission (triangle choke)	3rd Coast Grappling 3	Superfight	Nogi	December 7, 2019	(United States) Houston, TX
Win	129–9–3	(Brazil) Rousimar Palhares	Referee Decision	World Jiu-Jitsu Festival	Superfight	Nogi	October 6, 2019	(United States) Long Beach, CA
Win	128–9–3	(Brazil) Marcus Almeida	Negative Points (0–1)	ADCC 2019	Absolute	Nogi	September 29, 2019	(United States) Anaheim, CA
Win	127–9–3	(Australia) Lachlan Giles	Submission (rear naked choke)	ADCC 2019	Absolute	Nogi	September 29, 2019	(United States) Anaheim, CA
Win	126–9–3	(United States) Garry Tonon	Submission (rear naked choke)	ADCC 2019	Absolute	Nogi	September 29, 2019	(United States) Anaheim, CA
Win	125–9–3	(Brazil) Pedro Marinho	Submission (heel hook)	ADCC 2019	Absolute	Nogi	September 29, 2019	(United States) Anaheim, CA
Win	124–9–3	(Brazil) Vinicius Gazola	Submission (rear naked choke)	ADCC 2019	–99 kg	Nogi	September 29, 2019	(United States) Anaheim, CA
Win	123–9–3	(Brazil) Lucas Barbosa	Points (3–0)	ADCC 2019	–99 kg	Nogi	September 29, 2019	(United States) Anaheim, CA
Win	122–9–3	(United States) Tim Spriggs	Submission (rear naked choke)	ADCC 2019	–99 kg	Nogi	September 28, 2019	(United States) Anaheim, CA
Win	121–9–3	(Australia) Ben Hodgkinson	Submission (rear naked choke)	ADCC 2019	–99 kg	Nogi	September 28, 2019	(United States) Anaheim, CA
Win	120–9–3	(Brazil) Guilherme Vasconcelos	Submission (guillotine choke)	Kinektic 1	Absolute	Nogi	August 16, 2019	(United States) Anaheim, CA
Win	119–9–3	(Brazil) Rafael Domingos	Submission (rear naked choke)	Kinektic 1	Absolute	Nogi	August 16, 2019	(United States) Anaheim, CA
Win	118–9–3	(Brazil) Gabriel Checco	Submission (kimura)	Kinektic 1	Absolute	Nogi	August 16, 2019	(United States) Anaheim, CA
Win	117–9–3	(Brazil) João Gabriel Rocha	Points (1–0)	Kasai Super Series 1	Superfight	Nogi	February 2, 2019	(United States) Dallas, TX
Win	116–9–3	(Brazil) Yuri Simões	Advantages	IBJJF Nogi World Championship (black belt)	Absolute	Nogi	December 16, 2018	(United States) Anaheim, CA
Win	115–9–3	(Brazil) Roberto Abreu	Disqualification	IBJJF Nogi World Championship (black belt)	+97.5 kg	Nogi	December 16, 2018	(United States) Anaheim, CA
Win	114–9–3	(Brazil) Yuri Simões	Points (11–0)	IBJJF Nogi World Championship (black belt)	+97.5 kg	Nogi	December 16, 2018	(United States) Anaheim, CA
Win	113–9–3	(Brazil) Jackson Sousa	Submission (rear naked choke)	IBJJF Nogi World Championship (black belt)	Absolute	Nogi	December 15, 2018	(United States) Anaheim, CA
Win	112–9–3	(Brazil) Patrick Gaudio	Referee Decision	IBJJF Nogi World Championship (black belt)	Absolute	Nogi	December 15, 2018	(United States) Anaheim, CA
Win	111–9–3	(Norway) Vegard Randeberg	Submission (rear naked choke)	IBJJF Nogi World Championship (black belt)	Absolute	Nogi	December 15, 2018	(United States) Anaheim, CA
Win	110–9–3	(United States) Khalil Fadlallah	Submission (rear naked choke)	IBJJF Nogi World Championship (black belt)	Absolute	Nogi	December 15, 2018	(United States) Anaheim, CA
Win	109–9–3	(Greece) Evaggelos Moumtzis	Submission (armbar)	IBJJF Nogi World Championship (black belt)	+97.5 kg	Nogi	December 15, 2018	(United States) Anaheim, CA
Draw	108–9–3	(Brazil) Gregor Gracie	Draw	Quintet 3	Absolute	Nogi	October 5, 2018	(United States) Las Vegas, NV
Win	108–9–2	(Brazil) Vítor Ribeiro	Submission (armbar)	Quintet 3	Absolute	Nogi	October 5, 2018	(United States) Las Vegas, NV
Win	107–9–2	(Australia) Craig Jones	Submission (rear naked choke)	Quintet 3	Absolute	Nogi	October 5, 2018	(United States) Las Vegas, NV
Draw	106–9–2	(Brazil) Roberto de Souza	Draw	Quintet 3	Absolute	Nogi	October 5, 2018	(United States) Las Vegas, NV
Win	106–9–1	(Brazil) Marcos Souza	Submission (rear naked choke)	Quintet 3	Absolute	Nogi	October 5, 2018	(United States) Las Vegas, NV
Win	105–9–1	(United States) Josh Barnett	Submission (triangle choke)	Quintet 3	Absolute	Nogi	October 5, 2018	(United States) Las Vegas, NV
Win	104–9–1	(Brazil) Kaynan Duarte	Submission (rear naked choke)	IBJJF Pan Nogi (black belt)	Absolute	Nogi	September 15, 2018	(United States) New York City, NY
Win	103–9–1	(Brazil) Max Gimenis	Submission (rear naked choke)	IBJJF Pan Nogi (black belt)	Absolute	Nogi	September 15, 2018	(United States) New York City, NY
Win	102–9–1	(Brazil) Max Gimenis	Submission (rear naked choke)	IBJJF Pan Nogi (black belt)	+97.5 kg	Nogi	September 15, 2018	(United States) New York City, NY
Win	101–9–1	(United States) Charles McGuire	Submission (kimuroplata)	IBJJF Pan Nogi (black belt)	+97.5 kg	Nogi	September 15, 2018	(United States) New York City, NY
Loss	100–9–1	(Brazil) Vinny Magalhães	Points (0–5)	ACB JJ 13	Superfight	Nogi	May 4, 2018	(United States) Long Beach, CA
Win	100–8–1	(Brazil) Yuri Simões	Submission (rear naked choke)	Kasai Pro 1	Superfight	Nogi	December 9, 2017	(United States) Brooklyn, NY
Win	99–8–1	(Australia) Craig Jones	Submission (rear naked choke)	EBI 14	Absolute	Nogi	December 3, 2017	(United States) Los Angeles, CA
Win	98–8–1	(United States) Casey Hellenberg	Submission (rear naked choke)	EBI 14	Absolute	Nogi	December 3, 2017	(United States) Los Angeles, CA
Win	97–8–1	(United States) Patrick Donabedian	Submission (armbar)	EBI 14	Absolute	Nogi	December 3, 2017	(United States) Los Angeles, CA
Win	96–8–1	(United States) Dan Borovic	Submission (heel hook)	EBI 14	Absolute	Nogi	December 3, 2017	(United States) Los Angeles, CA
Win	95–8–1	(United States) Ralek Gracie	Submission (reverse triangle choke)	Metamoris 8	Superfight	Nogi	November 26, 2017	(United States) Los Angeles, CA
Loss	94–8–1	(Brazil) Felipe Pena	Points (0–6)	ADCC 2017	Absolute	Nogi	September 24, 2017	(Finland) Espoo
Win	94–7–1	(Brazil) Mahamed Aly	Submission (heel hook)	ADCC 2017	Absolute	Nogi	September 24, 2017	(Finland) Espoo
Win	93–7–1	(Australia) Craig Jones	Submission (arm-triangle choke)	ADCC 2017	Absolute	Nogi	September 24, 2017	(Finland) Espoo
Win	92–7–1	(Brazil) Roberto Abreu	Submission (heel hook)	ADCC 2017	Absolute	Nogi	September 24, 2017	(Finland) Espoo
Win	91–7–1	(United States) Keenan Cornelius	Submission (guillotine choke)	ADCC 2017	–88 kg	Nogi	September 24, 2017	(Finland) Espoo
Win	90–7–1	(Brazil) Alexandre Ribeiro	Referee Decision	ADCC 2017	–88 kg	Nogi	September 24, 2017	(Finland) Espoo
Win	89–7–1	(Brazil) Romulo Barral	Submission (rear naked choke)	ADCC 2017	–88 kg	Nogi	September 23, 2017	(Finland) Espoo
Win	88–7–1	(United States) Dillon Danis	Referee Decision	ADCC 2017	–88 kg	Nogi	September 23, 2017	(Finland) Espoo
Win	87–7–1	(United States) Devhonte Johnson	Submission (rear naked choke)	Grappling Industries	Absolute	Nogi	August 19, 2017	(United States) New York City, NY
Win	86–7–1	(United States) Aaron Johnson	Submission (reverse triangle choke)	Grappling Industries	Absolute	Nogi	August 19, 2017	(United States) New York City, NY
Win	85–7–1	(Montenegro) Mladen Jokmanovic	Submission (kimura)	Grappling Industries	Absolute	Nogi	August 19, 2017	(United States) New York City, NY
Win	84–7–1	(United States) Elliot Kelly	Submission (triangle armbar)	Fight2Win Pro 34	Superfight	Nogi	May 12, 2017	(United States) Denver, CO
Loss	83–7–1	(Brazil) Leandro Lo	Points (0–4)	ADCC West Coast Trials	Superfight	Nogi	April 15, 2017	(United States) Los Angeles, CA
Win	83–6–1	(Brazil) Lucas Barbosa	Referee Decision	Fight2Win Pro 30	Superfight	Nogi	April 8, 2017	(United States) Berkeley Township, NJ
Win	82–6–1	(Brazil) Vagner Rocha	Submission (rear naked choke)	EBI 11	–170 lbs	Nogi	March 6, 2017	(United States) Los Angeles, CA
Win	81–6–1	(Brazil) Marcel Gonçalves	Submission (rear naked choke)	EBI 11	–170 lbs	Nogi	March 6, 2017	(United States) Los Angeles, CA
Win	80–6–1	(United States) Chris Mckarski	Submission (guillotine choke)	EBI 11	–170 lbs	Nogi	March 6, 2017	(United States) Los Angeles, CA
Win	79–6–1	(United States) Jean-Paul Lebosnoyani	Submission (rear naked choke)	EBI 11	–170 lbs	Nogi	March 6, 2017	(United States) Los Angeles, CA
Win	78–6–1	(United States) Joe Baize	Submission (reverse triangle choke)	Submission Underground 3	Superfight	Nogi	January 29, 2017	(United States) Portland, OR
Win	77–6–1	(United States) Matthew Tesla	Submission (reverse triangle choke)	Sapateiro 6	Absolute	Nogi	January 21, 2017	(United States) Tampa, FL
Win	76–6–1	(United States) Jesseray Childrey	Submission (rear naked choke)	Sapateiro 6	Absolute	Nogi	January 21, 2017	(United States) Tampa, FL
Win	75–6–1	(Brazil) Antonio Carlos	Submission (reverse triangle)	Sapateiro 6	Absolute	Nogi	January 21, 2017	(United States) Tampa, FL
Win	74–6–1	(United States) Bryan Brown	Submission (rear naked choke)	Sapateiro 6	Absolute	Nogi	January 21, 2017	(United States) Tampa, FL
Loss	73–6–1	(Brazil) Felipe Pena	Submission (rear naked choke)	Studio 540	Superfight	Nogi	December 17, 2016	(United States) Solana Beach, CA
Win	73–5–1	(United States) Todd Mueckenheim	Submission (kimura)	Grappling Industries Manhattan	Superfight	Nogi	October 22, 2016	(United States) New York City, NY
Win	72–5–1	(United States) Kyle Griffin	Submission (heel hook)	EBI 8	–185 lbs	Nogi	September 11, 2016	(United States) Los Angeles, CA
Win	71–5–1	(United States) Josh Hayden	Submission (rear naked choke)	EBI 8	–185 lbs	Nogi	September 11, 2016	(United States) Los Angeles, CA
Win	70–5–1	(United States) Mike Hillebrand	Submission (rear naked choke)	EBI 8	–185 lbs	Nogi	September 11, 2016	(United States) Los Angeles, CA
Win	69–5–1	(United States) Matt Arroyo	Submission (heel hook)	EBI 8	–185 lbs	Nogi	September 11, 2016	(United States) Los Angeles, CA
Win	68–5–1	(United States) Keenan Cornelius	Submission (heel hook)	Grappling Industries	Superfight	Nogi	August 13, 2016	(United States) New York City, NY
Draw	67–5–1	(Brazil) Vagner Rocha	Draw	Sapateiro 2	Superfight	Nogi	June 11, 2016	(United States) Bradenton, FL
Win	67–5	(Russia) Rustam Chsiev	Submission (rear naked choke)	EBI 6	Absolute	Nogi	April 24, 2016	(United States) Los Angeles, CA
Win	66–5	(Brazil) Yuri Simões	Submission (rear naked choke)	EBI 6	Absolute	Nogi	April 24, 2016	(United States) Los Angeles, CA
Win	65–5	(Brazil) Marcello Salazar	Submission (kneebar)	EBI 6	Absolute	Nogi	April 24, 2016	(United States) Los Angeles, CA
Win	64–5	(United States) Jacen Flynn	Submission (rear naked choke)	EBI 6	Absolute	Nogi	April 24, 2016	(United States) Los Angeles, CA
Win	63–5	(United States) Nathan Orchard	Submission (reverse triangle choke)	Portland Sunday Open	Absolute	Nogi	April 3, 2016	(United States) Portland, OR
Win	62–5	(United States) Joshua Bacallao	Submission (heel hook)	Portland Sunday Open	Absolute	Nogi	April 3, 2016	(United States) Portland, OR
Win	61–5	(United States) James Partridge	Submission (heel hook)	Onnit Invitational 2	Superfight	Nogi	March 24, 2016	(United States) Austin, TX
Loss	60–5	(United States) Todd Mueckenheim	Referee Decision	Grappling Industries Manhattan	Absolute	Nogi	March 13, 2016	(United States) New York City, NY
Win	60–4	(United States) Nick Panebianco	Submission (rear naked choke)	Grappling Industries Manhattan	Absolute	Nogi	March 13, 2016	(United States) New York City, NY
Win	59–4	(United States) Harley Davis	Submission (rear naked choke)	Grappling Industries Manhattan	Absolute	Nogi	March 13, 2016	(United States) New York City, NY
Win	58–4	(United States) Kevin Berbrich	Submission (rear naked choke)	Goodfight Pro 2	–77 kg	Nogi	March 12, 2016	(United States) Langhorne, PA
Win	57–4	(United States) Pat Sabatini	Submission (heel hook)	Goodfight Pro 2	–77 kg	Nogi	March 12, 2016	(United States) Langhorne, PA
Win	56–4	(United States) Enrico Cocco	Submission (heel hook)	Sapateiro 1	Absolute	Nogi	March 5, 2016	(United States) Bradenton, FL
Win	55–4	(United States) PJ Barch	Submission (kneebar)	Sapateiro 1	Absolute	Nogi	March 5, 2016	(United States) Bradenton, FL
Win	54–4	(United States) Elliot Kelly	Submission (reverse triangle armbar)	Sapateiro 1	Absolute	Nogi	March 5, 2016	(United States) Bradenton, FL
Win	53–4	(United States) Ian Murray	Submission (heel hook)	Sapateiro 1	Absolute	Nogi	March 5, 2016	(United States) Bradenton, FL
Win	52–4	(United States) Jordan Tabor	Submission (heel hook)	Interclub	Superfight	Nogi	February 13, 2016	(United States) Gaithersburg, MD
Loss	51–4	(United States) Aaron Johnson	Points	Grappling Industries Montreal	Absolute	Nogi	February 6, 2016	(Canada) Montreal, QC
Win	51–3	(Canada) Eric Chibuluzo	Submission (footlock)	Grappling Industries Montreal	Absolute	Nogi	February 6, 2016	(Canada) Montreal, QC
Win	50–3	(United States) David Porter	Submission (rear naked choke)	Good Fight All-Star	–170 lbs	Nogi	December 4, 2015	(United States) Brooklyn, NY
Win	49–3	(United States) David Porter	Submission (armbar)	Show the Art Finishers 1	–170 lbs	Nogi	November 15, 2015	(United States) Green Brook Township, NJ
Win	48–3	(United States) Jordan Stiner	Submission (triangle choke)	Show the Art Finishers 1	–170 lbs	Nogi	November 15, 2015	(United States) Green Brook Township, NJ
Win	47–3	(Brazil) Mattheus Lutes	Submission (heel hook)	Show the Art Finishers 1	–170 lbs	Nogi	November 15, 2015	(United States) Green Brook Township, NJ
Win	46–3	(Brazil) Jacob Ferreria	Submission (toe hold)	IBJJF Nogi World Championship (brown belt)	–73.5 kg	Nogi	November 8, 2015	(United States) Long Beach, CA
Win	45–3	(Brazil) Sylvio Duran	Submission (rear naked choke)	IBJJF Nogi World Championship (brown belt)	–73.5 kg	Nogi	November 8, 2015	(United States) Long Beach, CA
Win	44–3	(Brazil) Lucas Tobias	Points (8–6)	IBJJF Nogi World Championship (brown belt)	–73.5 kg	Nogi	November 8, 2015	(United States) Long Beach, CA
Win	43–3	(United States) Devhonte Johnson	Submission (heel hook)	UGA: Fall Open	Superfight	Nogi	October 24, 2015	(United States) Lakewood, NJ
Win	42–3	(United States) Stephen Martinez	Submission (reverse triangle choke)	Newaza Challenge	Absolute	Nogi	September 13, 2015	(United States) Pasadena, CA
Win	41–3	(Brazil) Gabriel Arges	Submission (heel hook)	Newaza Challenge	Absolute	Nogi	September 13, 2015	(United States) Pasadena, CA
Win	40–3	(United States) Noah Tillis	Submission (heel hook)	Newaza Challenge	Absolute	Nogi	September 13, 2015	(United States) Pasadena, CA
Win	39–3	(United States) Gio Vasquez	Submission (toe hold)	Newaza Challenge	Absolute	Nogi	September 13, 2015	(United States) Pasadena, CA
Win	38–3	(United States) Ivan Taylor	Submission (heel hook)	UGA: Summer Open	Superfight	Nogi	June 27, 2015	(United States) Lakewood, NJ
Win	37–3	(United States) Dan Martinez	Submission (heel hook)	Grapplers Quest: All Star Pro	–185 lbs	Nogi	June 6, 2015	(United States) Edison, NJ
Win	36–3	(United States) Matt Arroyo	Submission (heel hook)	Grapplers Quest: All Star Pro	–185 lbs	Nogi	June 6, 2015	(United States) Edison, NJ
Win	35–3	(United States) Sean Spangler	Submission (reverse triangle choke)	Grapplers Quest: All Star Pro	–185 lbs	Nogi	June 6, 2015	(United States) Edison, NJ
Win	34–3	(United States) Steve Mowry	Points (4–1)	Kumite Classic	Absolute	Nogi	May 23, 2015	(United States) Monroeville, PA
Win	33–3	(United States) Evan Mulgrave	Submission (heel hook)	Kumite Classic	–185 lbs	Nogi	May 23, 2015	(United States) Monroeville, PA
Win	32–3	(United States) Todd Bevan	Submission (reverse triangle choke)	Kumite Classic	–185 lbs	Nogi	May 23, 2015	(United States) Monroeville, PA
Win	31–3	(United States) Jon Correa	Submission (reverse triangle choke)	Kumite Classic	–185 lbs	Nogi	May 23, 2015	(United States) Monroeville, PA
Loss	30–3	(United States) Mike Perez	Points	ADCC North; American Championship	–88 kg	Nogi	May 9, 2015	(United States) Coconut Creek, FL
Win	30–2	(United States) James Brasco	Points (4–0)	ADCC North; American Championship	–88 kg	Nogi	May 9, 2015	(United States) Coconut Creek, FL
Win	29–2	(United States) Avery McPhatter	Submission (rear naked choke)	ADCC North; American Championship	–88 kg	Nogi	May 9, 2015	(United States) Coconut Creek, FL
Win	28–2	(United States) Damien Nitkin	Points (5–0)	ADCC North; American Championship	–88 kg	Nogi	May 9, 2015	(United States) Coconut Creek, FL
Win	27–2	(Dominican Republic) Stanley Rosa	Submission (choke)	Naga World Championship	–170 lbs	Gi	April 25, 2015	(United States) Wildwood, NJ
Win	26–2	(United States) Richard Semides	Submission (reverse triangle choke)	Naga World Championship	–170 lbs	Gi	April 25, 2015	(United States) Wildwood, NJ
Win	25–2	(United States) Elon Hodge	Submission (cloverleaf)	Naga World Championship	–170 lbs	Nogi	April 25, 2015	(United States) Wildwood, NJ
Win	24–2	(United States) Scott Clymer	Submission (heel hook)	Naga World Championship	–170 lbs	Nogi	April 25, 2015	(United States) Wildwood, NJ
Win	23–2	(United States) Mickey Gall	Points	Naga World Championship	–170 lbs	Nogi	April 25, 2015	(United States) Wildwood, NJ
Win	22–2	(United States) Jesse Stokes	Submission (heel hook)	UGA: Spring Open	Superfight	Nogi	March 28, 2015	(United States) West Windsor Township, NJ
Win	21–2	(United States) Jason Rau	Referee Decision	Gym Wars II	Superfight	Gi	March 14, 2015	(United States) Stratford, NJ
Loss	20–2	(United States) Josh Hayden	Points	ADCC North; American Championship	–88 kg	Nogi	December 13, 2014	(United States) Nitro, WV
Win	20–1	(United States) Jason Rau	Submission (rear naked choke)	PGL IX	Superfight	Nogi	November 29, 2014	(United States) Stratford, NJ
Win	19–1	(United States) James Gonzales	Submission (kimura)	PGL IV	–155 lbs	Nogi	May 17, 2014	(United States) Berlin, NJ
Win	18–1	(United States) John Battle	Points	PGL IV	–155 lbs	Nogi	May 17, 2014	(United States) Berlin, NJ
Win	17–1	(United States) Todd Levin	Submission (heel hook)	PGL IV	–155 lbs	Nogi	May 17, 2014	(United States) Berlin, NJ
Win	16–1	(United States) Jon Forsythe	Submission (bow & arrow choke)	AGL 4	Absolute	Gi	April 13, 2013	(United States) Berlin, NJ
Loss	15–1	(United States) Mark Tarmann	Points	AGL 4	Absolute	Nogi	April 13, 2013	(United States) Berlin, NJ
Win	15–0	(United States) Dan Watkins	Submission (triangle choke)	AGL 4	Absolute	Nogi	April 13, 2013	(United States) Berlin, NJ
Win	14–0	(United States) Ken Podgorsek	Submission (rear naked choke)	AGL 4	Absolute	Nogi	April 13, 2013	(United States) Berlin, NJ
Win	13–0	(United States) Humberto Perea	Submission (rear naked choke)	AGL 4	–155 lbs	Nogi	April 13, 2013	(United States) Berlin, NJ
Win	12–0	(United States) David Thies	Points	AGL 4	–155 lbs	Nogi	April 13, 2013	(United States) Berlin, NJ
Win	11–0	(United States) Kevin Gibbs	Points	AGL 4	–155 lbs	Nogi	April 13, 2013	(United States) Berlin, NJ
Win	10–0	(United States) Ryan Cafaro	Submission (rear naked choke)	AGL 3	Superfight	Nogi	January 19, 2013	(United States) Berlin, NJ
Win	9–0	(United States) Steven Calero	4-2 points	Grapplers Quest: World Championship	-160 lbs	Nogi	July 21, 2012	(United States) Morristown, NJ
Win	8–0	(United States) Joe Pyfer	Submission (rear naked choke)	Grapplers Quest: World Championship	-160 lbs	Nogi	July 21, 2012	(United States) Morristown, NJ
Win	7–0	(El Salvador) Alejandro Dominguez	Points	Grapplers Quest: Beast from the East	-170 lbs	Gi	March 25, 2012	(United States) Wayne, NJ
Win	6–0	(United States) Angelo Claiborne	Submission (arm-triangle choke)	Grapplers Quest: Beast from the East	-170 lbs	Gi	March 25, 2012	(United States) Wayne, NJ
Win	5–0	(El Salvador) Alejandro Dominguez	Submission (guillotine choke)	Grapplers Quest: Beast from the East	-170 lbs	Nogi	March 24, 2012	(United States) Wayne, NJ
Win	4–0	(United States) Sulaman Zafar	Points	Grapplers Quest: Beast from the East	-170 lbs	Nogi	March 24, 2012	(United States) Wayne, NJ
Win	3–0	(United States) Angelo Claiborne	Points	Grapplers Quest: Beast from the East	-170 lbs	Nogi	March 24, 2012	(United States) Wayne, NJ
Win	2–0	(United States) Angelo Claiborne	Points	Grapplers Quest: World Championships	-170 lbs	Nogi	December 10, 2011	(United States) Asbury Park, NJ
Win	1–0	(United States) Nick Salles	Disqualification (slam)	Grapplers Quest: World Championships	-170 lbs	Nogi	December 10, 2011	(United States) Asbury Park, NJ

== Freestyle wrestling results ==
Freestyle Matches
Res.	Record	Opponent	Score	Date	Event	Location
Loss	0–1	(United States) Pat Downey	TF 0–11	February 29, 2020	2020 BJJ Fanatics Grand Prix	(United States) Beverly, Massachusetts
