= Rafaela Guedes =

Brazilian jiu-jitsu practitioner from Brazil

- Born: May 23, 1992 (age 34); Manaus, Brazil
- Division: Heavy: Gi Weight Classes; Under 79.3 kilograms (175 lb); No-Gi Weight Classes; Under 76.5 kilograms (169 lb)
- Team: Atos Jiu-Jitsu; NS Brotherhood
- Trainer: André Galvão
- Rank: first degree BJJ black belt (Note: under André and Angelica Galvão)

Rafaela Guedes (born May 23, 1992) is a Brazilian submission grappler, and Brazilian jiu-jitsu (BJJ) black belt athlete. An IBJJF World champion at brown belt, Guedes is a two-time World No-Gi, Pan American (Gi and No-GI) black belt champion. Originally from Manaus, Brazil now fighting out of San Diego, California, Guedes is also the WNO women's heavyweight champion, a 2021 World jiu-jitsu double medallist and the 2022 ADCC Submission Fighting silver medallist.

== Biography ==
Rafaela Ribeiro Guedes was born on 23 May 1992, in Manaus, Brazil. She played handball from the age of 10 until she was forced to stop following an injury at the age of sixteen. After watching her cousin compete, she started Brazilian Jiu-Jitsu (BJJ) near her grandmother's house at a neighbourhood's social project before joining Academia Dailson Pinheiro de Jiu-Jitsu in Manaus where she earned her blue belt. At 22 she moved to São Paulo joining Leandro Lo’s New School Brotherhood academy. After moving to San Diego, California to join Atos Academy under André Galvão, Guedes earned her black belt in September 2020.

== Grappling career ==
Guedes attempted to defend her heavyweight title against Nathiely De Jesus at WNO 20: Night of Champions on October 1, 2023. She lost the match by unanimous decision.

Guedes then competed at the IBJJF No-Gi World Championship 2023, where she won a silver medal in the heavyweight division.

Guedes was invited to compete in the over 65 kg division at the 2024 ADCC World Championship. She defeated Nia Blackman, Kendall Reusing, and Nathiely De Jesus to win the division. She also entered the women's absolute division where she defeated Bianca Basilio on points and was submitted by Adele Fornarino, finishing fourth after she was unable to compete in the bronze medal match.

Guedes faced Paige Ivette at Who’s Number One 26 on February 7, 2025. Dhe won the match by decision.

== Competitive summary ==
Main achievements:

- IBJJF World No-Gi Champion (2021 (Note: Weight and Absolute))
- IBJJF Pan Champion (2020)
- IBJJF Pan Championship No-Gi Champion (2020 (Note: Absolute))
- WNO heavyweight champion (2021)
- 2022 ADCC Submission Fighting World Championship + 60 kg silver medallist
- 2nd place IBJJF World Championship (2022)
- 3rd place IBJJF World Championship (2022)

In coloured belts:

- IBJJF World Champion (2019 brown)
- UAFJJF Grand Slam, Miami (2020 brown & black)
- UAFJJF Grand Slam, L.A (2017 purple)
- 2nd Place IBJJF World Championship No-Gi (2019 brown)
- 2nd Place UAFJJF Grand Slam, Rio (2017 purple)
- 3rd Place IBJJF World Championship (2016 purple, 2019 brown)
- 3rd place IBJJF World Championship No-Gi (2019 brown)
- 3rd place CBJJ Brazilian Nationals (2016 / 2017 / 2018 purple)
- 3rd place UAFJJF Grand Slam, L.A (2019 brown + black)

== Awards ==
- Jitsmagazine BJJ Awards 'Female Breakout Grappler of the Year' (2020)
