= Osamah Al-Marwai =

Brazilian jiu-jitsu practitioner from Yemen

Osamah Almarwai
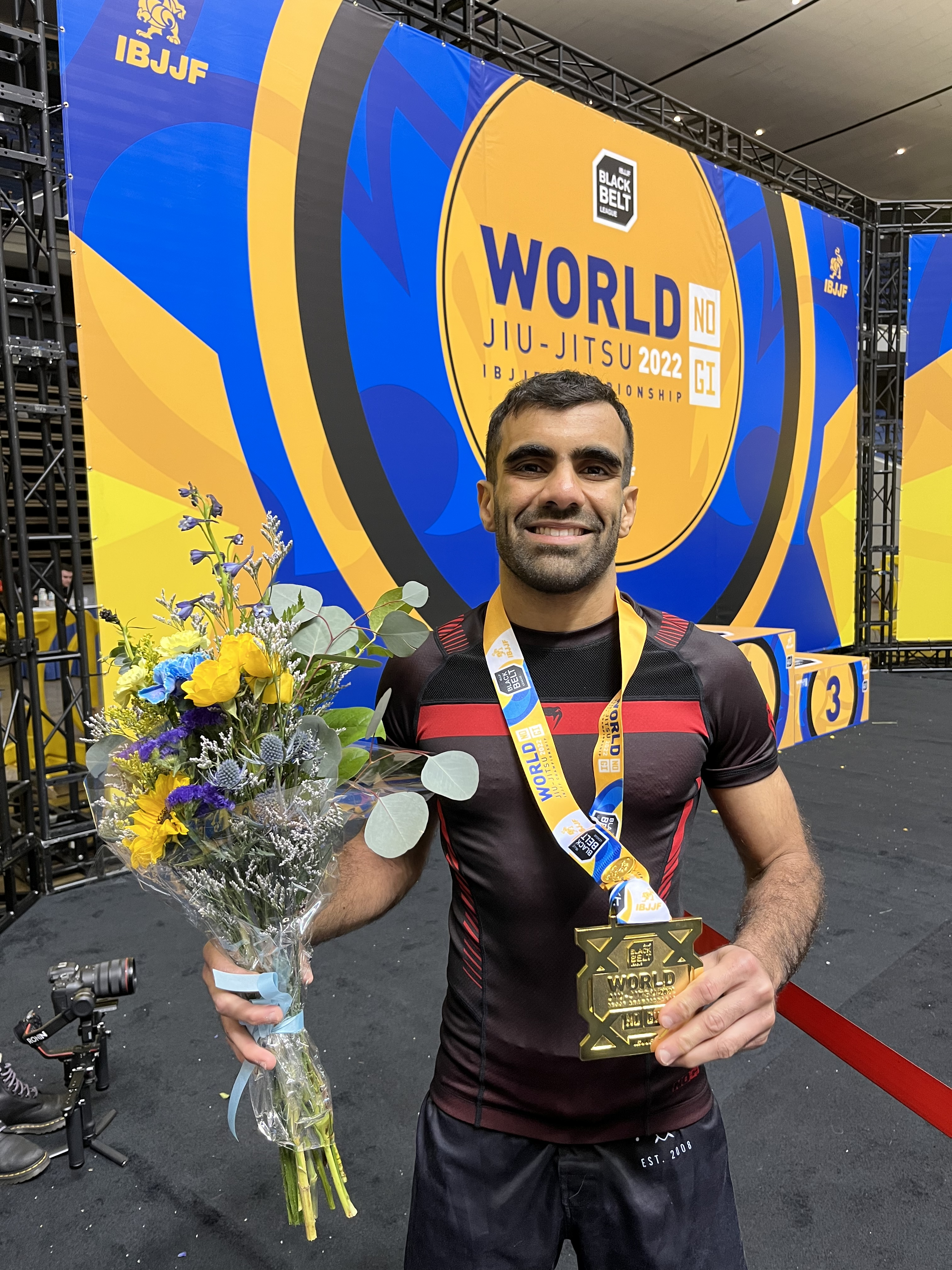
- Born: Osamah Ali Almarwai; 11 April 1992 (age 34); Jeddah, Saudi Arabia
- Other names: Osa
- Nationality: Yemen
- Division: Roosterweight -57.5 kg (126.8 lb)
- Team: Atos Jiu-Jitsu
- Trainer: Andre Galvao
- Rank: black belt in BJJ (Note: under Andre Galvao)

Osamah Ali Almarwai (Arabic: أسامة علي المروعي, born on April 11, 1992) is a Yemeni submission grappler and Brazilian jiu-jitsu black belt competitor.

An American National and World No-Gi champion in brown belt, Almarwai is the first black belt IBJJF World No-Gi and 2x Pan No-Gi champion from the Middle East. Almarwai is currently ranked No. 1 in the 2022-2023 IBJJF No-Gi Rooster division.

== Early life ==
Osamah Ali Almarwai was born on April 11, 1992, in Jeddah, Saudi Arabia. During Almarwai's early years he played football and taekwondo. During his teenage years he relocated to the United States where he had a brief experience training Brazilian jiu-jitsu (BJJ) at university.

== Career ==
At 19 he moved back to Saudi Arabia and continued training BJJ with coaches, Mohammed Al Dabbas, and Gerardo Dudamell, who awarded him his purple belt. Almarwai later trained with Karim Shah who promoted him to brown belt.

After 7 years of training in Saudi Arabia, Almarwai moved back to the US at the age of 26. He relocated to Florida and started training at Fight Sports. In 2019, Almarwai attended an ADCC Submission Grappling training camp which persuaded him to move to California and join Atos Jiu-Jitsu under BJJ legend André Galvão. In 2019, Almarwai started competing in IBJJF competitions in the brown belt division, winning silver in 2020 at the Pan No-Gi Championship. The following year he became World No-Gi Champion and American Nationals No-Gi Champion.

After receiving his black belt from Galvao, Almarwai competed in the 2022 World No-Gi Championship in Anaheim, California, where he defeated Henrique Rossi in a straight ankle lock; Coco Izutsu by points; and Roiter Silva Junior by points. In 2022, Almarwai competed in 16 competitions. As part of the Atos team, Almarwai trains with the Ruotolo brothers, Kade Ruotolo and Tye Ruotolo.

=== 2023 ===
Almarwai faced Mikey Musumeci for the ONE Flyweight Submission Grappling World Championship at ONE Fight Night 10 on May 5, 2023. Almarwai lost the fight via submission due to a rear naked choke at 8:03 of the first round.

=== 2024 ===
Almarwai competed against Cleber Sousa in a flyweight submission grappling match at ONE 166 on March 1, 2024. He lost the match by reverse triangle armbar.

Almarwai competed against Zayed Alkatheeri at Pit Submission Series 4 on April 20, 2024. He lost the match by unanimous decision. He then won a gold medal in the roosterweight division at the IBJJF No Gi American National Championship 2024 on June 29, 2024.

2025

Almarwai made a successful comeback from knee surgery, returning to competition just a few months after recovery. He went on to win his second IBJJF No-Gi Pan American Championship title in 2025, marking a strong return to form and reaffirming his position among the top athletes in his division.

== Championships and accomplishments ==
Main Achievements (Black Belt):

- Number 1 IBJJF Rooster Weight No-Gi Rankings (2022)
- IBJJF World No-Gi Champion (2022)
- IBJJF Pan No-Gi Champion (2022, 2025)
- IBJJF American Nationals No-Gi Champion (2022, 2024)
- IBJJF World Master Champion (2022)

Main Achievements (Colored Belts):

- Number 1 IBJJF Rooster Weight No-Gi Rankings (2021 brown)
- IBJJF World No-Gi Champion (2021 brown)
- IBJJF American Nationals No-Gi Champion (2021 brown)
- 2nd place IBJJF Pans No-Gi Championship (2020 brown)
- 2nd place IBJJF Pan Championship (2021 brown)
- 3rd place IBJJF World Championship (2021 brown)
