= Caio Terra =

Brazilian Jiu-Jitsu practitioner

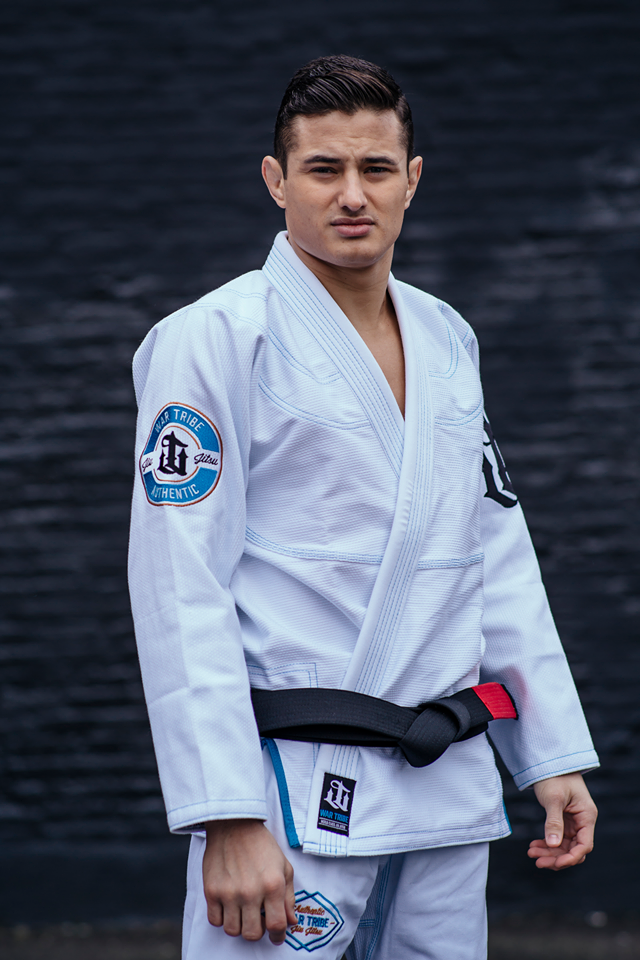
- Born: 8 February 1986 (age 39); Rio de Janeiro, Brazil
- Team: Caio Terra Association (BRASA CTA)
- Rank: 4th degree black belt in Brazilian Jiu-Jitsu

Caio Terra
Medal record

Representing Brazil

Brazilian Jiu-Jitsu

World Championship
Gold medal – first place	2008 California, USA	-57kg
Silver medal – second place	2009 California, USA	-57kg
Silver medal – second place	2010 California, USA	-57kg
Silver medal – second place	2011 California, USA	-57kg
Silver medal – second place	2012 California, USA	-57kg
Gold medal – first place	2013 California, USA	-57kg
Silver medal – second place	2016 California, USA	-57kg
Silver medal – second place	2017 California, USA	-57kg

No-Gi World Championship
Gold medal – first place	2008 California, USA	-61.5kg
Gold medal – first place	2009 California, USA	-61.5kg
Gold medal – first place	2010 California, USA	-61.5kg
Gold medal – first place	2011 California, USA	-61.5kg
Gold medal – first place	2012 California, USA	-54.5kg
Gold medal – first place	2013 California, USA	-54.5kg
Gold medal – first place	2014 California, USA	-54.5kg
Gold medal – first place	2015 California, USA	-54.5kg
Gold medal – first place	2016 California, USA	-54.5kg
Gold medal – first place	2017 California, USA	-54.5kg

Pan Championship
Silver medal – second place	2010 California, USA	-64kg
Gold medal – first place	2011 California, USA	-64kg
Gold medal – first place	2012 California, USA	-57kg
Gold medal – first place	2013 California, USA	-57kg
Silver medal – second place	2015 California, USA	-57kg

Nogi Pan Championship
Gold medal – first place	2010 New York, USA	-61.5kg
Gold medal – first place	2011 New York, USA	-61.5kg
Bronze medal – third place	2013 New York, USA	-61.5kg

European Nogi Championship
Gold medal – first place	2013 Rome, Italy	Absolute
Gold medal – first place	2013 Rome, Italy	-56.5kg

Caio Terra (born 8 February 1986) is a Brazilian Brazilian Jiu Jitsu (BJJ) competitor and world champion. Caio began training Brazilian Jiu-Jitsu in 2003 and received his black belt in 2006. His promotion to black belt is one of the quickest recorded in Brazilian Jiu Jitsu history.

== Career ==
Terra's promotion to black belt occurred in the same year in which the IBJJF set minimum time frames for each belt, making it mandatory for a brown belt to compete in the brown belt division for a minimum of 1 year before being promoted. As Caio had not hit the time frame outlined by the federation, he was blocked from competing at the 2007 Brazilian Nationals (Brasileiro). Later that year, and although the federation had plans to veto Caio from the World Championship, the IBJJF made a last-minute exception accepting his entry for competition. This was the last time someone with less than 1 year experience at brown belt was legally allowed to compete as a black belt in an IBJJF tournament.

Caio is known for his maxim "Technique Conquers All", an expression he has tested and proven through his successful victories in the open weight divisions. Caio Terra now trains and owns the Caio Terra Academy in San Jose, California. He also owns Caio Terra Online, an internet based instructional site where Caio and invited instructors, provide technical insight and instruction plans to subscribers and affiliate academies.

In 2017 Caio retired from No Gi competition and decided to focus his energy on his team. Since retiring, Caio has helped develop Mikey Musumeci (the only four-time Black Belt American World Champion), Mason Fowler, Yuri Simoes, Rudson Telles, Jeremy Jackson, Kaniela Kahuanui, and others.

The Caio Terra Academy was closed during the coronavirus pandemic; Terra revealed that his gym was threatened with $5,000 fines by local public health officials if he ran classes during the pandemic lockdown period. On 28 September 2020, Terra was awarded the 4th degree on his BJJ black belt from Master Paulo Mauricio Strauch.

== Instructor lineage ==
Mitsuyo Maeda → Carlos Gracie → Reylson Gracie → Paulo Maurício Strauch → Caio Terra

== Career highlights ==
- IBJJF World Champion 2008/2013
- IBJJF World No Gi Champion 2008-2017 (Ten Time World No Gi Champion)
- IBJJF Pan American Champion 2011/2012/2013
- USBJJF/ IBJJF American Nationals Champion 2010*/2011**/2012
- USBJJF/ IBJJF American Nationals No Gi Champion 2012*
- IBJJF European Open Champion 2014/2015/2016/2017/2018
- IBJJF European No Gi Open Champion 2013**
- IBJJF Las Vegas Open Champion 2010**/2011**/2012
- UKBJJF/IBJJF British National Champion 2015**
- UKBJJF/IBJJF British National No Gi Champion 2015**
- IBJJF World Championship Runner-Up 2009-2011, 2017
- USBJJF/IBJJF American National Championship Runner-Up 2010/2012/2014
- Metamoris 1 Super fight winner
- FTW Bantamweight GI and No Gi Title Holder

*Absolute **Weight and Absolute

== Personal life ==
Terra was involved in a car accident in 2021 that left him with a hip injury that required surgery in order for him to continue practicing Brazilian jiu-jitsu.

== See also ==
- World Jiu-Jitsu Championship
- World Nogi Brazilian Jiu-Jitsu Championship
- Pan-American Championship
- Pan Jiu-Jitsu No-Gi Championship
- European Brazilian Jiu-Jitsu Championship
- European Nogi Brazilian Jiu Jitsu Championship
