= Hillary Williams =

- Born: Hillary Williams; October 14, 1988 (age 38); Arkansas, United States
- Other names: "Killary"
- Nationality: (United States) American
- Height: 1.73 m (5 ft 8 in)
- Weight: 145 lb (66 kg) Middleweight
- Style: Brazilian Jiu-Jitsu, grappling
- Team: Westside MMA
- Rank: Black belt in Brazilian jiu-jitsu

Other information
- University: UCA Honors College
- Mixed martial arts record from Sherdog
- Last updated on: 2010-10-06

Hillary Williams (born October 14, 1988) is an American submission grappler and Brazilian jiu-jitsu practitioner.

== Career highlight ==
Williams began her Brazilian jiu-jitsu career in 2006. After four years of training, she became a World Champion. She is a four-time World Champion and a six-time Pan American Champion. Williams received her black belt from Rolando Delgado and Matt Hamilton on June 12, 2010. She only spent seven months and 14 days as a brown belt.

== Instructor lineage ==
- Jigoro Kano → Tsunejiro Tomita → Mitsuyo Maeda → Carlos Gracie Sr. → Carlson Gracie → André Pederneiras → Toni Emanuel → Matt Hamilton → Hillary Williams → Bethany Verkamp
- Jigoro Kano → Tsunejiro Tomita → Mitsuyo Maeda → Carlos Gracie Sr. → Carlos "Carlinhos" Gracie Jr. → Diojone Farias → Rolando Delgado → Hillary Williams → Bethany Verkamp

== Grappling Credentials ==
- 06/06/10 - First - World Championships IBJJF Women's Brown/Black Middleweight
- 09/26/09 - Third - ADCC World Championships Women's <60 kg
