= Emily Kwok =

Brazilian jiu-jitsu practitioner from Canada

- Born: Emiri Kwok; 5 October 1980 (age 46); Aomori, Japan
- Nationality: Canadian
- Division: Middleweight: Gi Weight Classes; -69 kilograms (152 lb); No-Gi Weight Classes; -66.5 kilograms (147 lb)
- Style: Brazilian jiu-jitsu
- Team: Princeton Brazilian Jiu-Jitsu; Princeton BJJ – Marcelo Garcia
- Trainer: Marcelo Garcia
- Rank: 3rd Deg. BJJ black belt

Mixed martial arts record
- Total: 1
- Wins: 1
- By decision: 1
- Losses: 0

Other information
- Occupation: BJJ instructor, consultant
- Website: emilykwok princetonbjj
- Mixed martial arts record from Sherdog

Emily Kwok (born 5 October 1980) is a Canadian submission grappler. A 3rd degree black belt Brazilian jiu-jitsu (BJJ) instructor and former mixed martial arts (MMA) competitor, Kwok is the first Canadian woman to receive a black belt in Brazilian jiu-jitsu and the first to become world champion. As one of the first women to rise to prominence, Kwok is widely regarded as an early pioneer of the BJJ scene in North America.

== Career ==
Emily R. Kwok was born on 5 October 1980, in Aomori, Japan, from a Japanese mother and a Chinese father, when she was a baby her family immigrated to Canada. During her late teens in Vancouver, Kwok discovered sambo then started training in Brazilian jiu-jitsu (BJJ) in 2001, complemented by Wing Chun and kickboxing, before moving to New York City. She received her blue belt from Renzo Gracie, purple from Takashi Ouchi, and brown and black belt from Ricardo Almeida. As a brown belt in the brown/black category, Kwok won the 2007 final defeating black belt Luciana Dias with a score of 17—0 becoming the middleweight world champion. Kwok became the first Canadian woman to receive a black belt in Brazilian jiu-jitsu and in 2007 the first to become Brazilian jiu-jitsu world champion. (Note: in the brown/black category)

Throughout her competitive career, Kwok also fought has an amateur and professional MMA fighter for the Smackgirl organisation in Korea and Japan. Affiliated with Marcelo Garcia, Kwok founded Princeton BJJ with Art Keintz in 2010 in Princeton, New Jersey where she trains and teaches. She has also been an early organizer of Women's Grappling Camp. Kwok has been called "a legend ahead of her time" and is widely regarded as a pioneer, paving the way for women in the sport. In 2018, she won the World Master Championship in Las Vegas. In April 2022, Kwok returned to competition winning gold at the 2022 Pan Championship in the Master 3 / middleweight division. Kwok won gold in January at the 2023 Brazilian Jiu-Jitsu European Championship competing in Master 3 / middleweight division.

== Brazilian jiu-jitsu competitive summary ==
Main Achievements:

- IBJJF World Champion (2007)
- IBJJF World No-GI Champion (2010)
- 2nd Place IBJJF World No-GI Championship (2007 / 2011)
- 2nd Place IBJJF American Nationals Championship (2009 (Note: Absolute))
- 3rd place IBJJF World Champion (2010)
- 3rd Place IBJJF Pans Championship (2008, 2012)

== Instructor lineage ==
Mitsuyo Maeda > Carlos Gracie > Helio Gracie > Carlos Gracie Jr. > Renzo Gracie > Ricardo Almeida > Emily Kwok

== See also ==
- Ana Carolina Schmitt
