= Lucas Leite =

Brazilian practitioner of Brazilian Jiu-Jitsu (born 1982)

- Born: November 3, 1982 (age 43); São Paulo, Brazil
- Team: Checkmat
- Rank: black belt in Brazilian Jiu-Jitsu

Lucas Leite
Medal record

Representing Brazil

Brazilian Jiu-Jitsu

World Jiu-Jitsu Championship
Gold medal – first place	2007 California, USA	-82 kg
Bronze medal – third place	2009 California, USA	-82 kg
Silver medal – second place	2011 California, USA	-82 kg
Bronze medal – third place	2012 California, USA	-82 kg
Silver medal – second place	2015 California, USA	-94 kg

Brazilian Jiu-Jitsu

Nogi World Jiu-Jitsu Championship
Gold medal – first place	2009 California, USA	-79.5 kg
Gold medal – first place	2011 California, USA	-91.5 kg
Silver medal – second place	2013 California, USA	-91.5 kg
Bronze medal – third place	2013 California, USA	Absolute
Gold medal – first place	2014 California, USA	-91.5 kg

Brazilian Jiu-Jitsu

World Cup
Silver medal – second place	2012 Abu Dhabi, UAE	-82kg

Brazilian Jiu-Jitsu

Pan American Jiu-Jitsu Championship
Gold medal – first place	2007 California, USA	-76 kg
Gold medal – first place	2009 California, USA	-82 kg
Silver medal – second place	2011 California, USA	-82 kg
Gold medal – first place	2012 California, USA	-94 kg
Silver medal – second place	2014 California, USA	-94 kg
Gold medal – first place	2015 California, USA	-94 kg

Lucas Joas Gomes Leite (born November 3, 1982) is a Brazilian grappler. He is a multi-time world champion with first-place finishes at the Gi, Nogi, and Grapplers Quest world championships. Leite started training Brazilian Jiu-jitsu when he was 12 years old under Ryan Gracie. He earned his black belt under Leo Vieira in 2006.

Lucas is noted for having a dynamic half guard game utilizing a twisting knee-hip pressure, stating that he believes it is effective both in gi and no-gi Brazilian Jiu Jitsu. Though a natural lightweight, Leite competes frequently at heavyweight or absolute . Leite moved from Brazil to California in 2007 and opened his own jiu-jitsu academy, where he currently teaches full-time. Leite's students include UFC fighter Jessica Penne. He is a member of Checkmat BJJ Academy. Leite won the Pan American Championships in the under 94 kg division in 2015.

== See also ==
- List of Brazilian Jiu-Jitsu practitioners
