= Victor Estima =

BJJ practitioner

Medal record

Representing Brazil

World Jiu-Jitsu Championship
Bronze medal – third place	2008 California, USA	-82 kg
Bronze medal – third place	2009 California, USA	-82 kg
Bronze medal – third place	2012 California, USA	-82 kg
Bronze medal – third place	2013 California, USA	-82 kg

Pan American Championships
Silver medal – second place	2012 California, USA	-82 kg

World Nogi Jiu-Jitsu Championship
Gold medal – first place	2011 California, USA	-79.5 kg

European Jiu-Jitsu Championship
Bronze medal – third place	2011 Lisbon, Portugal	-82 kg
Gold medal – first place	2012 Lisbon, Portugal	-82 kg

Victor Estima is a fourth degree Carlos Gracie, Jr. black belt who, along with his brother Braulio Estima, was coached under Ze Radiola in his native Brazil. He has competed and won at the highest level in Brazilian Jiu-Jitsu at European, Pan-American and World Championships.

== Early life and introduction to BJJ ==
Victor Estima began his martial arts journey in judo at age 8 alongside his brother Braulio. Around age 12, he transitioned to Brazilian Jiu-Jitsu under coach Charles dos Anjos, later training under Zé “Radiola” in Recife. Unable to find same-age training partners initially, he took a brief hiatus before fully committing to the sport.

== Gracie Barra Braço de Prata ==
Victor is based at the Gracie Barra Braço de Prata Brazilian Jiu Jitsu Academy in Lisbon Portugal. He was formally based at the Gracie Barra Nottingham Jiu Jitsu Academy in Nottingham England from 2011 until July 2021.

== Career ==
=== Instructor and team roles ===
Estima relocated to the UK and co-founded the Gracie Barra Nottingham academy in 2011. In 2021, he moved to Lisbon to lead the Gracie Barra Braço de Prata academy and now serves as Gracie Barra Regional Director for Europe.

=== Competitive highlights ===
Estima has been a dominant middleweight competitor, winning numerous medals both gi and no-gi, and is notably credited with co-creating the “Estima Lock” submission alongside his brother.

== Personal life ==
Victor Estima is the younger brother of BJJ legend Braulio Estima and lives in Lisbon, where he leads Gracie Barra Braço de Prata. He is known for his technical innovation and teaching philosophy—emphasizing discipline, respect, and community building in his academies.

== Tournament results ==
- 4 × State Champion
- 2002 World Mundials Absolute division (blue belt) – bronze medal
- 2003 World Mundials (adult division – blue belt) – silver medal
- 2005 World Mundials (adult division – purple belt) – silver medal
- 2006 Panams (brown belt adult middle) – silver medal
- 2008 European Championships (black belt adult middle) – bronze medal
- 2008 European Championships (absolute black belt) – bronze medal
- 2008 World Mundials (black belt adult middle) – bronze medal
- 2009 World Pro (black belt adult -85 kg) – silver medal
- 2010 World Mundials No Gi (black belt adult middle) – bronze medal
- 2011 European Championships (black belt adult middle) – bronze medal
- 2011 World Mundials No Gi (black belt adult middle) – gold medal
- 2012 European Championships (black belt adult middle) – gold medal
- 2012 Panams (black belt adult middle) – silver medal
- 2012 British Open (black belt adult middle) – gold medal
- 2012 World Mundials (black belt adult middle) – bronze medal
- 2013 IBJJF Pro League (black belt adult middle) – gold medal
- 2013 British Open (black belt adult middle) – gold medal
- 2013 British Open (absolute black belt) – gold medal
- 2013 World Pro (black belt adult -85 kg) – silver medal
- 2013 World Mundials (black belt adult middle) – bronze medal
- 2014 World Pro (black belt adult -85 kg) – silver medal
- 2014 World Mundials (black belt adult middle) – bronze medal
- 2015 World Pro (black belt adult -85 kg) – silver medal
- 2015 World Mundials (black belt adult middle) – bronze medal
- 2016 IBJJF British Nationals (black belt adult middle) – gold medal
- 2016 IBJJF British Nationals (absolute black belt) – gold medal
- 2022 Compnet UK National Championship (black belt master middle) – gold medal
- 2022 Compnet UK National Championship (black belt master absolute) – gold medal
