= Gabrielle McComb =

Brazilian jiu-jitsu practitioner from Brazil

- Born: Gabi McComb Lima; 3 October 1997 (age 29)
- Division: GI Weight Classes: Feather (-58.5 kg); Light (-64 kg); No-GI Weight Classes: Feather (-56.5 kg); Middle (-66.5 kg)
- Style: Brazilian Jiu-Jitsu
- Team: Atos Jiu-Jitsu USA
- Trainer: André Galvão
- Rank: BJJ black belt

Gabrielle McComb Lima (born 3 October 1997), also known as Gabi McComb, is a Brazilian submission grappler and black belt Brazilian jiu-jitsu competitor. McComb is a multiple times World and Pan-American champion, in both Gi and No-Gi. She is the 2021 Black Belt Featherweight World Champion.

== Career ==
Gabrielle McComb Lima was born on 3 October 1997 in Manaus, Brazil. From the age of 8, she started training Jiu-Jitsu alongside her sister Andrea. As a blue belt she won the 2014 World Jiu-Jitsu Championship in the Absolute division, winning silver in her weight class, followed by gold at the Pan-American Championship in 2015. That same year, she was promoted to purple belt by her sister Andrea McComb. As a purple belt, she won the 2015 Pan-American Championship followed by double gold at the CBJJ Brazilian Nationals and double gold at the 2015 South American Championship. The following year, she won double gold at the 2016 World Championship after defeating Andressa Cintra, the middleweight world champion. Subsequent wins included the Absolute division at the Pan Championship after beating Heloisa Ferreira in the final, and double gold at the American Nationals. She was then approached by legendary black belt Leticia Ribeiro and Fabrício Camões who offered her to join Gracie Humaitá South Bay academy. As a brown belt, she became the 2017 World No-Gi Champion also winning the Pans Championship in her weight division and in absolute.

=== Black belt career ===
==== 2018-2022 ====
In June 2018, McComb was promoted to black belt by her coaches. That same year, she won the Pan-American No-GI Championship and the AJP Grand Slam LA World Tour. In 2019, she came in third at the world championship and won the Pan-American two years in a row (2019, 2020). In 2021, McComb changed team and started training at Atos Jiu-Jitsu HQ in San Diego, California. That year, she won two medals at the 2021 World No-GI Championship, silver in the featherweight division and bronze in the Absolute. McComb then won silver at the 2021 Pans and gold at the 2021 World Jiu-Jitsu Championship after defeating Bianca Basilio in the featherweight final.

==== 2023-2024 ====
She then competed at the IBJJF No-Gi World Championship 2023, where she won a gold medal in the middleweight division and a silver medal in the absolute division. McComb competed at the second ADCC South American Trials 2024 on March 9, 2024, where she won a silver medal at under 65 kg.

McComb faced Raquel Pa'aluhi at UFC Fight Pass Invitational 8 on October 10, 2024. She lost the match by submission.

She was invited to compete in the lightweight division of IBJJF: The Crown 2024 on November 18, 2024. She beat Vitoria Vieira and lost to Brianna Ste-Marie, before defeating Cassia Moura to win a bronze medal.

== Brazilian Jiu-Jitsu competitive summary ==
Main Achievements (Black Belt)

- IBJJF World Champion (2021)
- IBJJF Pans Champion (2019 / 2020)
- IBJJF Pans Champion No-Gi (2018)
- IBJJF American Nationals Champion (2020)
- UAEJJF Grand Slam LA Champion (2018)
- IBJJF LA BJJ Pro Champion (2020)
- 2nd place IBJJF Pan Championship (2021)
- 2nd place IBJJF World Championship No-Gi (2021)
- 3rd place IBJJF World Championship No-Gi (2019 (Note: Weight and absolute))
- 3rd place IBJJF World Championship (2019)
- 3rd place IBJJF Pans Championship No-Gi (2018 (Note: Absolute))
- 3rd place IBJJF American Nationals (2020)

Main Achievements (Coloured Belts)

- IBJJF World Champion (2016) purple, 2014 blue)
- IBJJF World Champion No-Gi (2017 brown)
- IBJJF Juvenile World Champion (2013)
- IBJJF Pans Champion (2018/2017 brown, 2016 purple, 2015 blue)
- IBJJF South American Champion (2015 purple)
- CBJJ Brazilian Nationals Champion (2015 purple)
- CBJJ Juvenile Brazilian Nationals Champion (2014)
- UAEJJF Abu Dhabi Pro Champion (2016 purple)
- IBJJF American Nationals Champion (2016 purple)
- UAEJJF Grand Slam LA Champion (2016 purple)
- 2nd place IBJJF World Championship (2014 blue)
- 2nd place IBJJF Pans Championship (2016 purple, 2015 blue)
- 2nd place CBJJ Juvenile Brazilian Nationals (2013)
- 2nd place UAEJJF Grand Slam LA (2017)
- 2nd place EBI Flyweight Tournament (2017)
- 3rd place IBJJF Juvenile World Championship (2013)

== Instructor lineage ==
Carlos Gracie > Helio Gracie > Royler Gracie > Vinicius Aieta > Letícia Ribeiro > Gabi McComb

== Mixed martial arts record ==
Professional record breakdown
5 matches	5 wins	0 losses
By knockout	2	0
By submission	3	0

Res.	Record	Opponent	Method	Event	Date	Round	Time	Location	Notes
Win	5–0	Taylor Mauldin	Submission (face crank)	559 Fights 127	September 27, 2026	2	3:08	Porterville, California, United States	Won the vacant 559 Fights Women's Flyweight Championship.
Win	4–0	Odeth Realyvásquez	TKO (punches)	UWC Mexico 58	June 7, 2026	1	0:32	Tijuana, Mexico	Catchweight (120 lb) bout.
Win	3–0	Marcela Aparicio	TKO (punches and elbows)	UWC Mexico 57	March 22, 2026	1	1:20	Tijuana, Mexico	Catchweight (132 lb) bout.
Win	2–0	Cara Greenwell	Submission (armbar)	LFA 213	July 26, 2025	2	4:28	Lemoore, California, United States	Strawweight debut.
Win	1–0	Esmira Mammadova	Submission (rear-naked choke)	LFA 199	January 10, 2025	1	3:16	Lemoore, California, United States	Flyweight debut; Mammadova missed weight (126.6 lb).
