= World IBJJF Jiu-Jitsu Championship =

Brazilian Jiu-Jitsu competitions

World Brazilian Jiu-Jitsu Championship
- Current event or competition: 2023 World Jiu-Jitsu Championship

Competition details
- Location: Long Beach, California
- Local name(s): Mundials, Worlds
- Discipline: Brazilian Jiu-Jitsu
- Type: Annual
- Organiser: International Brazilian Jiu-Jitsu Federation

History
- First edition: 4 February 1996 in Rio de Janeiro, Brazil
- Editions: 27 (2023)
- Most wins: Marcus Almeida (13)
- Most recent: 2023

The World IBJJF Jiu-Jitsu Championship is a Brazilian jiu-jitsu tournament held annually by the International Brazilian Jiu-Jitsu Federation. It is widely considered the most important and prestigious jiu-jitsu tournament of the year.

The first edition took place in February 1996 in Rio de Janeiro, Brazil. Since 2007 the tournament has been held in California. The last edition of the championship took place at the Walter Pyramid in Long Beach California in 2025.

== History ==
The first World Championship was held on 3 and 4 February 1996 at the Tijuca Tênis Clube in Rio de Janeiro, Brazil. In 2007 the tournament moved to California State University in Long Beach, US where it has been held ever since. The Championship is commonly known as "the Worlds" or "Mundials". Many considered the World Jiu-Jitsu Championship as the toughest and the most prestigious Gi tournament in the world. Its counterpart in No-Gi is the World IBJJF Jiu-Jitsu No-Gi Championship. As of 2024, Marcus Almeida has won 13 Men's IBJJF World Championships, and Beatriz Mesquita has won 10 Women's IBJJF World Championships, the highest numbers in history.

== Weight classes ==
The men's division started in 1996 with a total of 10 divisions from –57.5 kg to the absolute (open class) division. The women's division started in 1998 with two weight classes "Light" and "Heavy". Since 2016 the women's division now comprised a total of 9 weight classes from -48.5 kg up to the absolute (open class) division.

Divisions	Men	Women
Rooster	57.5 kg (126.8 lb)	48.5 kg (106.9 lb)
Light Feather	64 kg (141.1 lb)	53.5 kg (117.9 lb)
Feather	70 kg (154.3 lb)	58.5 kg (129.0 lb)
Light	76 kg (167.6 lb)	64 kg (141.1 lb)
Middle	82.3 kg (181.4 lb)	69 kg (152.1 lb)
Medium Heavy	88.3 kg (194.7 lb)	74 kg (163.1 lb)
Heavy	94.3 kg (207.9 lb)	79.3 kg (174.8 lb)
Super Heavy	100.5 kg (221.6 lb)	No weight limit
Ultra Heavy	No weight limit	n/a
Open Class	open to all weight divisions	open to all weight divisions

== Competitions by year ==
=== Men's black belt world champions ===
Year	57 kg	64 kg	70 kg	76 kg	82 kg	88 kg	94 kg	100 kg	+100 kg	Absolute
1996	(Brazil) Marcos Barreto (1/1)	(Brazil) Helio Moreira (1/1)	(Brazil) Royler Gracie (1/4)	(Brazil) Paulo Barroso (1/1)	(Brazil) Roberto Correa (1/1)	(Brazil) Roberto Magalhães (1/4)	(Brazil) Fábio Gurgel (1/4)	(Brazil) Ricardo Libório (1/1)	(Brazil) Mário Sperry (1/3)	(Brazil) Amaury Bitetti (1/2)
1997	(Brazil) Robson Moura (1/5)	(Angola) João Roque (1/1)	(Brazil) Royler Gracie (2/4)	(Brazil) Marcio Feitosa (1/3)	(Brazil) Saulo Ribeiro (1/5)	(Brazil) Roberto Magalhães (2/4)	(Brazil) Fábio Gurgel (2/4)	(Brazil) Mário Sperry (2/3)	(Brazil) Luiz Guilherme (1/1)	(Brazil) Amaury Bitetti (2/2)
1998	(Brazil) Marcelo Pereira (1/1)	(Brazil) Robson Moura (2/5)	(Brazil) Royler Gracie (3/4)	(Brazil) Leo Vieira (1/1)	(Brazil) Fernando Vasconcelos (1/1)	(Brazil) Rafael Correa (1/1)	(Brazil) Saulo Ribeiro (2/5)	(Brazil) Roberto Magalhães (3/4)	(Brazil) Roberto Traven (1/2)	(Brazil) Mário Sperry (3/3)
1999	(Brazil) Omar Salum (1/2)	(Brazil) Robson Moura (3/5)	(Brazil) Royler Gracie (4/4)	(Brazil) Vítor Ribeiro (1/3)	(Brazil) Alexandre Paiva (1/1)	(Brazil) Saulo Ribeiro (3/5)	(Brazil) Murilo Bustamante (1/1)	(Brazil) Leo Leite (1/2)	(Brazil) Roberto Traven (2/2)	(Brazil) Rodrigo Medeiros (1/2)
2000	(Brazil) Omar Salum (2/2)	(Brazil) Robson Moura (4/5)	(United States) B.J. Penn (1/1)	(Brazil) Vítor Ribeiro (2/3)	(Brazil) Fernando Augusto (1/2)	(Brazil) Roberto Magalhães (4/4)	(Brazil) Fábio Gurgel (3/4)	(Brazil) Saulo Ribeiro (4/5)	(Brazil) Leo Leite (2/2)	(Brazil) Rodrigo Medeiros (2/2)
2001	(Brazil) Bernardo Pitel (1/1)	(Brazil) Ricardo Vieira (1/1)	(Brazil) Fredson Paixão (1/3)	(Brazil) Marcio Feitosa (2/3)	(Brazil) Vítor Ribeiro (3/3)	(Brazil) Fernando Pontes (1/2)	(Brazil) Fábio Gurgel (4/4)	(Brazil) Fernando Marqués (1/1)	(Brazil) Marcio Corleta (1/2)	(Brazil) Fernando Pontes (2/2)
2002	(Brazil) Marcos Norat (1/1)	(Brazil) Carlos Lemos (1/1)	(Brazil) Fredson Paixão (2/3)	(Brazil) Marcio Feitosa (3/3)	(Brazil) Delson Heleno (1/1)	(Brazil) Saulo Ribeiro (5/5)	(Brazil) Fábio Leopoldo (1/1)	(Brazil) Gabriel Vella (1/2)	(Brazil) Márcio Cruz (1/3)	(Brazil) Márcio Cruz (2/3)
2003	(Brazil) Felipe Costa (1/1)	(Brazil) Bibiano Fernandes (1/3)	(Brazil) Mario Reis (1/2)	(Brazil) Daniel Moraes (1/2)	(Brazil) Fernando Augusto (2/2)	(Brazil) Cassio Werneck (1/1)	(Brazil) Jefferson Moura (1/1)	(Brazil) Erik Wanderley (1/1)	(Brazil) Fabrício Werdum (1/2)	(Brazil) Márcio Cruz (3/3)
2004	(Brazil) Gabriel Moraes (1/2)	(Brazil) Fernardo Vieira (1/1)	(Brazil) Mario Reis (2/2)	(Brazil) Daniel Moraes (2/2)	(Brazil) Marcelo Garcia (1/5)	(Brazil) Braulio Estima (1/3)	(Brazil) Alexandre Ribeiro (1/7)	(Brazil) Roger Gracie (1/10)	(Brazil) Fabrício Werdum (2/2)	(Brazil) Ronaldo Souza (1/3)
2005	(Brazil) Samuel Braga (1/2)	(Brazil) Bibiano Fernandes (2/3)	(Brazil) Fredson Paixão (3/3)	(Brazil) Celso Vinicius (1/3)	(Brazil) André Galvão (1/5)	(Brazil) Ronaldo Souza (2/3)	(United States) Robert Drysdale (1/1)	(Brazil) Roger Gracie (2/10)	(Brazil) Francisco Fernandes (1/1)	(Brazil) Ronaldo Souza (3/3)
2006	(Brazil) Daniel Otero (1/1)	(Brazil) Bibiano Fernandes (3/3)	(Brazil) Rubens Charles (1/5)	(Brazil) Celso Vinicius (2/3)	(Brazil) Marcelo Garcia (2/5)	(Brazil) Braulio Estima (2/3)	(Brazil) Alexandre Ribeiro (2/7)	(Brazil) Roger Gracie (3/10)	(Brazil) Gabriel Gonzaga (1/1)	(Brazil) Alexandre Ribeiro (3/7)
2007	(Brazil) Bruno Malfacine (1/10)	(Brazil) Robson Moura (5/5)	(Brazil) Rubens Charles (2/5)	(Brazil) Lucas Lepri (1/6)	(Brazil) Lucas Leite (1/1)	(Brazil) Romulo Barral (1/5)	(Brazil) Alexandre Ribeiro (4/7)	(Brazil) Roger Gracie (4/10)	(United States) Rafael Lovato Jr. (1/1)	(Brazil) Roger Gracie (5/10)
2008	(Brazil) Caio Terra (1/2)	(Brazil) Samuel Braga (2/2)	(Brazil) Rubens Charles (3/5)	(Brazil) Celso Vinicius (3/3)	(Brazil) Sérgio Moraes (1/2)	(Brazil) André Galvão (2/5)	(Brazil) Alexandre Ribeiro (5/7)	(Brazil) Antônio Braga Neto (1/2)	(Brazil) Roger Gracie (6/10)	(Brazil) Alexandre Ribeiro (6/7)
2009	(Brazil) Bruno Malfacine (2/10)	(Brazil) Guilherme Mendes (1/4)	(Brazil) Rubens Charles (4/5)	(Brazil) Michael Langhi (1/3)	(Brazil) Marcelo Garcia (3/5)	(Brazil) Romulo Barral (2/5)	(Brazil) Braulio Estima (3/3)	(Brazil) Roger Gracie (7/10)	(Brazil) Gabriel Vella (2/2)	(Brazil) Roger Gracie (8/10)
2010	(Brazil) Bruno Malfacine (3/10)	(Brazil) Pablo Silva (1/1)	(Brazil) Rafael Mendes (1/6)	(Brazil) Michael Langhi (2/3)	(Brazil) Marcelo Garcia (4/5)	(Brazil) Tarsis Humphreys (1/1)	(Brazil) Bernardo Faria (1/4)	(Brazil) Roger Gracie (9/10)	(Brazil) Rodrigo Cavaca (1/1)	(Brazil) Roger Gracie (10/10)
2011	(Brazil) Bruno Malfacine (4/10)	(Brazil) Guilherme Mendes (2/4)	(Brazil) Rafael Mendes (2/6)	(Brazil) Gilbert Burns (1/1)	(Brazil) Marcelo Garcia (5/5)	(Brazil) Sérgio Moraes (2/2)	(Brazil) Rodolfo Vieira (1/5)	(Brazil) Leo Nogueira (1/2)	(Brazil) Antônio Braga Neto (2/2)	(Brazil) Rodolfo Vieira (2/5)
2012	(Brazil) Bruno Malfacine (5/10)	(Brazil) Guilherme Mendes (3/4)	(Brazil) Rafael Mendes (3/6)	(Brazil) Leandro Lo (1/8)	(Brazil) Otávio Souza (1/3)	(Brazil) Romulo Barral (3/5)	(Brazil) Rodolfo Vieira (3/5)	(Brazil) Leo Nogueira (2/2)	(Brazil) Marcus Almeida (1/13)	(Brazil) Marcus Almeida (2/13)
2013	(Brazil) Caio Terra (2/2)	(Brazil) Gabriel Moraes (2/2)	(Brazil) Augusto Mendes (1/1)	(Brazil) Leandro Lo (2/8)	(Brazil) Otávio Souza (2/3)	(Brazil) Romulo Barral (4/5)	(Brazil) Rodolfo Vieira (4/5)	(Brazil) Bernardo Faria (2/4)	(Brazil) Marcus Almeida (3/13)	(Brazil) Marcus Almeida (4/13)
2014	(Brazil) Bruno Malfacine (6/10)	(Brazil) Guilherme Mendes (4/4)	(Brazil) Rafael Mendes (4/6)	(Brazil) Lucas Lepri (2/6)	(Brazil) Leandro Lo (3/8)	(Brazil) Romulo Barral (5/5)	(Brazil) André Galvão (3/5)	(Brazil) Rodolfo Vieira (5/5)	(Brazil) Marcus Almeida (5/13)	(Brazil) Marcus Almeida (6/13)
2015	(Brazil) Bruno Malfacine (7/10)	(Brazil) Paulo Miyao (1/1)	(Brazil) Rafael Mendes (5/6)	(Brazil) Michael Langhi (3/3)	(Brazil) Claudio Calasans (1/1)	(Brazil) Leandro Lo (4/8)	(Brazil) Alexandre Ribeiro (7/7)	(Brazil) Bernardo Faria (3/4)	(Brazil) Gabriel Lucas (1/1)	(Brazil) Bernardo Faria (4/4)
2016	(Brazil) Bruno Malfacine (8/10)	(Brazil) Ary Farias (1/1)	(Brazil) Rafael Mendes (6/6)	(Brazil) Lucas Lepri (3/6)	(Brazil) Otávio Souza (3/3)	(Brazil) Leandro Lo (5/8)	(Brazil) André Galvão (4/5)	(Brazil) Alexandro Ceconi (1/1)	(Brazil) Marcus Almeida (7/13)	(Brazil) Marcus Almeida (8/13)
2017	(Brazil) Bruno Malfacine (9/10)	(United States) Mikey Musumeci (1/4)	(Brazil) Rubens Charles (5/5)	(Brazil) Lucas Lepri (4/6)	(Brazil) Gabriel Arges (1/2)	(Brazil) André Galvão (5/5)	(Brazil) Nicholas Meregali (1/3)	(Brazil) Erberth Santos (1/1)	(Brazil) Marcus Almeida (9/13)	(Brazil) Marcus Almeida (10/13)
2018	(Brazil) Bruno Malfacine (10/10)	(United States) Mikey Musumeci (2/4)	(United States) Jamil Hill (1/1)	(Brazil) Lucas Lepri (5/6)	(Brazil) Isaque Bahiense (1/1)	(Brazil) Lucas Barbosa (1/1)	(Brazil) Felipe Pena (1/2)	(Brazil) Mahamed Aly (1/1)	(Brazil) Marcus Almeida (11/13)	(Brazil) Leandro Lo (6/8)
2019	(United States) Mikey Musumeci (3/4)	(Brazil) João Miyao (1/1)	(Brazil) Matheus Gabriel (1/3)	(Brazil) Lucas Lepri (6/6)	(Brazil) Gabriel Arges (2/2)	(Brazil) Felipe Pena (2/2)	(Brazil) Leandro Lo (7/8)	(Brazil) Nicholas Meregali (2/3)	(Brazil) Marcus Almeida (12/13)	(Brazil) Marcus Almeida (13/13)
2021	(United States) Mikey Musumeci (4/4)	(Brazil) Diego "Pato" Oliveira Batista (1/5)	(Brazil) Fabrício Andrey (1/1)	(Brazil) Renato Canuto (1/1)	(Brazil) Tainan Dalpra (1/4)	(Brazil) Gustavo Batista (1/3)	(Brazil) Kaynan Duarte (1/2)	(Brazil) Erich Munis (1/7)	(Brazil) Victor Hugo (1/4)	
2022	(Brazil) Thalison Soares (1/1)	(Brazil) Meyram Maquine (1/2)	(United States) Isaac Doederlein (1/1)	(United States) Tye Ruotolo (1/1)	(Brazil) Tainan Dalpra (2/4)	(Brazil) Leandro Lo (8/8)	(Brazil) Kaynan Duarte (2/2)	(Brazil) Erich Munis (2/7)	(Brazil) Victor Hugo (2/4)	(Brazil) Nicholas Meregali (3/3)
2023	(Brazil) Lucas Pinheiro (1/1)	(Brazil) Diego "Pato" Oliveira Batista (2/5)	(Brazil) Samuel Nagai (1/1)	(Brazil) Johnatha Alves (1/1)	(Brazil) Jansen Gomes (1/3)	(Brazil) Gustavo Batista (2/3)	(Brazil) Fellipe Andrew (1/1)	(Brazil) Erich Munis (3/7)	(Brazil) Victor Hugo (3/4)	(Brazil) Victor Hugo (4/4)
2024	(Brazil) Carlos 'Bebeto' Oliveira (1/1)	(Brazil) Diego "Pato" Oliveira Batista (3/5)	(Brazil) Meyram Maquine (2/2)	(Brazil) Micael Galvão (1/1)	(Brazil) Jackson Nagai (1/1)	(Brazil) Gustavo Batista (3/3)	(Poland) Adam Wardziński (1/2)	(Brazil) Anderson Munis (1/1)	(Morocco) Seif-Eddine Houmine (1/2)	(Brazil) Erich Munis (4/7)
2025	(United States) Michael Jalen Fonacier (1/2)	(Brazil) Diego "Pato" Oliveira Batista (4/5)	(Brazil) João "Bisnaga" Mendes (1/1)	(Brazil) Matheus Gabriel (2/3)	(Brazil) Tainan Dalpra (3/4)	(Brazil) Jansen Gomes (2/3)	(Poland) Adam Wardziński (2/2)	(Brazil) Erich Munis (5/7)	(Brazil) Roosevelt Souza (1/1)	(Brazil) Erich Munis (6/7)
2026	(United States) Michael Jalen Fonacier (2/2)	(Brazil) Diego "Pato" Oliveira Batista (5/5)	(United States) Cole Abate (1/1)	(Brazil) Matheus Gabriel (3/3)	(Brazil) Tainan Dalpra (4/4)	(Brazil) Jansen Gomes (3/3)	(Australia) Nicholas Maglicic (1/1)	(Brazil) Vinicius Liberati (1/1)	(Morocco) Seif-Eddine Houmine (2/2)	(Brazil) Erich Munis (7/7)

=== Women's black belt world champions ===
Year	Host	–48 kg	–53 kg	–58 kg	–64 kg	–69 kg	–74 kg	–80 kg	+80 kg	Absolute
1998	(Brazil)				(Brazil) Tais Ramos (1/1)	(Brazil) Rosângela Conceição (1/3)				
1999	(Brazil)				(Brazil) Alessandra Vieira (1/3)	(Brazil) Alessandra Oliveira (1/2)	(Brazil) Cristina Pereira (1/1)			
2000	(Brazil)		(Brazil) Daniela Figueredo (1/1)	(Brazil) Leticia Ribeiro (1/7)	(Brazil) Alessandra Oliveira (2/2)	(Brazil) Renata Pimentel (1/1)	(Brazil) Erika Paes (1/1)			
2001	(Brazil)		(Brazil) Ana Michelle (1/1)	(Brazil) Bianca Andrade (1/7)	(Brazil) Claudia Oliveira (1/1)	(Brazil) Juliana Vieira (1/1)	(Brazil) Ana Carolina Ferreira (1/1)			
2002	(Brazil)		(Brazil) Virginia Maria (1/1)	(Brazil) Leticia Ribeiro (2/7)	(Brazil) Alessandra Vieira (2/3)	(Brazil) Hannette Staack (1/7)	(Brazil) Mirela Cortes (1/2)			
2003	(Brazil)		(Brazil) Danielle Piermatei (1/3)	(Brazil) Andrezza Pinho (1/1)	(Brazil) Hannette Staack (2/7)	(Brazil) Poliana Lago (1/3)	(Brazil) Rosângela Conceição (2/3)			
2004	(Brazil)		(Brazil) Danielle Piermatei (2/3)	(Brazil) Bianca Andrade (2/6)	(Brazil) Hannette Staack (3/7)	(Brazil) Poliana Lago (2/3)	(Brazil) Mirela Cortes (2/2)			
2005	(Brazil)		(Brazil) Danielle Piermatei (3/3)	(Brazil) Bianca Andrade (3/6)	(Brazil) Alessandra Vieira (3/3)	(Brazil) Poliana Lago (3/3)	(Brazil) Rosângela Conceição (3/3)			
2006	(Brazil)		(Brazil) Michelle Nicolini (1/8)	(Brazil) Leticia Ribeiro (3/7)	(Brazil) Kyra Gracie (1/4)	(Brazil) Caroline de Lazzerok (1/1)	(Brazil) Luiza Fernandes (1/1)			
2007	(United States)		(Brazil) Michelle Nicolini (2/8)	(France) Laurence Cousin (1/1)	(Brazil) Hannette Staack (4/7)	(Canada) Emily Kwok (1/1)	(South Africa) Penny Thomas (1/2)			(Brazil) Michelle Nicolini (3/8)
2008	(United States)		(Brazil) Mirian Cerqueira (1/1)	(Brazil) Bianca Andrade (4/6)	(Brazil) Kyra Gracie (2/4)	(Brazil) Hannette Staack (5/7)	(Brazil) Ana Laura Cordeiro (1/3)	(Brazil) Gabi Garcia (1/6)		(Brazil) Kyra Gracie (3/4)
2009	(United States)		(Brazil) Leticia Ribeiro (4/7)	(Brazil) Bianca Andrade (5/6)	(Brazil) Luanna Alzuguir (1/5)	(Brazil) Hannette Staack (6/7)	(South Africa) Penny Thomas (2/2)	(United States) Lana Stefanac (1/2)		(United States) Lana Stefanac (2/2)
2010	(United States)		(Brazil) Leticia Ribeiro (5/7)	(Brazil) Bianca Andrade (6/6)	(Brazil) Kyra Gracie (4/4)	(United States) Hillary Williams (1/1)	(Brazil) Michelle Nicolini (4/8)	(Brazil) Gabi Garcia (2/6)		(Brazil) Luanna Alzuguir (2/5)
2011	(United States)		(Brazil) Leticia Ribeiro (6/7)	(Brazil) Michelle Nicolini (5/8)	(Brazil) Luanna Alzuguir (3/5)	(Brazil) Hannette Staack (7/7)	(Brazil) Talita Nogueira (1/1)	(Brazil) Gabi Garcia (3/6)		(Brazil) Gabi Garcia (4/6)
2012	(United States)		(Brazil) Leticia Ribeiro (7/7)	(Brazil) Michelle Nicolini (6/8)	(Brazil) Beatriz Mesquita (1/10)	(Brazil) Luanna Alzuguir (4/5)	(Brazil) Fernanda Mazelli (1/3)	(Brazil) Gabi Garcia (5/6)		(Brazil) Gabi Garcia (6/6)
2013	(United States)		(Brazil) Gezary Matuda (1/3)	(Brazil) Marina Ribeiro (1/1)	(Brazil) Beatriz Mesquita (2/10)	(Brazil) Luanna Alzuguir (5/5)	(Brazil) Michelle Nicolini (7/8)	(Brazil) Andresa Correa (1/3)		(Brazil) Beatriz Mesquita (3/10)
2014	(United States)	(Japan) Shiho Yaginuma (1/1)	(Brazil) Gezary Matuda(2/3)	(Brazil) Michelle Nicolini (8/8)	(Brazil) Beatriz Mesquita (4/10)	(Sweden) Janni Larsson (1/1)	(Brazil) Ana Laura Cordeiro (2/3)	(Brazil) Andresa Correa (2/3)	(Finland) Venla Luukkonen (1/2)	(Brazil) Beatriz Mesquita (5/10)
2015	(United States)		(Japan) Rikako Yuasa (1/4)	(United States) Mackenzie Dern (1/2)	(Brazil) Beatriz Mesquita (6/10)	(Brazil) Luiza Monteiro (1/3)	(Brazil) Ana Laura Cordeiro (3/3)	(Lithuania) Dominyka Obelenyte (1/4)	(Brazil) Fernanda Mazelli (2/3)	(Lithuania) Dominyka Obelenyte (2/4)
2016	(United States)	(Japan) Rikako Yuasa (2/4)	(Brazil) Gezary Matuda (3/3)	(Brazil) Mackenzie Dern (2/2)	(Brazil) Beatriz Mesquita (7/10)	(Brazil) Monique Elias (1/1)	(Brazil) Andresa Correa (3/3)	(Brazil) Fernanda Mazzelli (3/3)	(Lithuania) Dominyka Obelenyte (3/4)	(Lithuania) Dominyka Obelenyte (4/4)
2017	(United States)	(Japan) Rikako Yuasa (3/4)	(Brazil) Talita Alencar (1/1)	(Sweden) Maxine Thylin (1/1)	(Brazil) Luiza Monteiro (2/3)	(Brazil) Ana Carolina Vieira (1/5)	(Brazil) Nathiely de Jesus (1/5)	(Brazil) Claudia Do val (1/3)	(Brazil) Tayane Porfírio (1/2)	(Brazil) Tayane Porfírio (2/2)
2018	(United States)	(Japan) Rikako Yuasa (4/4)	(Brazil) Amanda Monteiro (1/1)	(Brazil) Karen Antunes (1/1)	(Brazil) Beatriz Mesquita (8/10)	(Brazil) Ana Carolina Vieira (2/5)	(Brazil) Claudia Do val (2/3)	(Brazil) Nathiely de Jesus (2/5)	(Finland) Venla Luukkonen (2/2)	(Brazil) Nathiely de Jesus (3/5)
2019	(United States)	(Brazil) Mayssa Bastos (1/6)	(United States) Tammi Musumeci (1/1)	(Brazil) Ana Carolina Schmitt (1/1)	(Brazil) Beatriz Mesquita (9/10)	(Brazil) Ana Carolina Vieira (3/5)	(Brazil) Andressa Cintra (1/5)	(Brazil) Nathiely de Jesus (4/5)	(Brazil) Claudia Do val (3/3)	(Brazil) Nathiely de Jesus (5/5)
2021	(United States)	(Brazil) Mayssa Bastos (2/6)	(Brazil) Anna Rodrigues (1/2)	(Brazil) Gabrielle McComb (1/1)	(Brazil) Beatriz Mesquita (10/10)	(Brazil) Andressa Cintra (2/5)	(Brazil) Ana Carolina Vieira (4/5)	(Brazil) Melissa Cueto (1/2)	(Brazil) Gabi Pessanha (1/10)	(Brazil) Gabi Pessanha (2/10)
2022	(United States)	(Brazil) Mayssa Bastos (3/6)	(Brazil) Anna Rodrigues (2/2)	(Brazil) Bianca Basílio (1/2)	(Wales) Ffion Davies (1/2)	(Brazil) Andressa Cintra (3/5)	(Brazil) Ana Carolina Vieira (5/5)	(Brazil) Larissa Dias (1/2)	(Brazil) Gabi Pessanha (3/10)	(Brazil) Gabi Pessanha (4/10)
2023	(United States)	(Brazil) Mayssa Bastos (4/6)	(Cambodia) Jessa Khan (1/1)	(Brazil) Bianca Basílio (2/2)	(Wales) Ffion Davies (2/2)	(Brazil) Andressa Cintra (4/5)	(United States) Amy Campo (1/1)	(Brazil) Melissa Cueto (2/2)	(Brazil) Gabi Pessanha (5/10)	(Brazil) Gabi Pessanha (6/10)
2024	(United States)	(Brazil) Mayssa Bastos (5/6)	(Brazil) Thamires Aquino (1/1)	(Brazil) Nathalie Ribeiro (1/1)	(Brazil) Luiza Monteiro (3/3)	(Brazil) Andressa Cintra (5/5)	(Brazil) Thamara Ferreira (1/2)	(Brazil) Tamiris Silva (1/1)	(Brazil) Gabi Pessanha (7/10)	(Brazil) Gabi Pessanha (8/10)
2025	(United States)	(Brazil) Mayssa Bastos (6/6)	(United States) Mia Funegra (1/1)	(Brazil) Larissa Campos (1/1)	(Brazil) Janaina Lebre (1/1)	(Brazil) Thalyta "Thata" Silva (1/1)	(Brazil) Thamara Ferreira (2/2)	(Brazil) Larissa Dias (2/2)	(Brazil) Gabi Pessanha (9/10)	(Brazil) Gabi Pessanha (10/10)

== List of winners by total titles ==
Rank	Winner	Total	Absolute	Weight Class	Winning years	Gender
1	(Brazil) Marcus Almeida	13	6	7	2012, 2013, 2014, 2016, 2017, 2018, 2019	M
2	(Brazil) Roger Gracie	10	3	7	2004, 2005, 2006, 2007, 2008, 2009, 2010	M
2	(Brazil) Bruno Malfacine	10	0	10	2007, 2009, 2010, 2011, 2012, 2014, 2015, 2016, 2017, 2018	M
2	(Brazil) Beatriz Mesquita	10	2	8	2012, 2013, 2014, 2015, 2016, 2018, 2019, 2021	F
2	(Brazil) Gabi Pessanha	10	5	5	2021, 2022, 2023, 2024, 2025	F
6	(Brazil) Michelle Nicolini	8	1	7	2006, 2007, 2010, 2011, 2012, 2013, 2014	F
6	(Brazil) Leandro Lo	8	1	7	2012, 2013, 2014, 2015, 2016, 2018, 2019, 2022	M
8	(Brazil) Alexandre Ribeiro	7	2	5	2004, 2006, 2007, 2008, 2015	M
8	(Brazil) Leticia Ribeiro	7	0	7	2000, 2002, 2006, 2009, 2010, 2011, 2012	F
8	(Brazil) Hannette Staack	7	0	7	2002, 2003, 2004, 2007, 2008, 2009, 2011	F
8	(Brazil) Erich Munis	7	3	4	2021, 2022, 2023, 2024, 2025, 2026	M
11	(Brazil) Gabi Garcia	6	2	4	2008, 2010, 2011, 2012	F
11	(Brazil) Bianca Andrade	6	0	6	2001, 2004, 2005, 2008, 2009, 2010	F
11	(Brazil) Rafael Mendes	6	0	6	2010, 2011, 2012, 2014, 2015, 2016	M
11	(Brazil) Lucas Lepri	6	0	6	2007, 2014, 2016, 2017, 2018, 2019	M
11	(Brazil) Mayssa Bastos	6	0	6	2019, 2021, 2022, 2023, 2024, 2025	F
17	(Brazil) Nathiely de Jesus	5	2	3	2017, 2018, 2019	F
17	(Brazil) Luana Alzuguir	5	1	4	2009, 2010, 2011, 2012, 2013	F
17	(Brazil) Rodolfo Vieira	5	1	4	2011, 2012, 2013, 2014	M
17	(Brazil) Saulo Ribeiro	5	0	5	1997, 1998, 1999, 2000, 2002	M
17	(Brazil) Robson Moura	5	0	5	1997, 1998, 1999, 2000, 2007	M
17	(Brazil) Marcelo Garcia	5	0	5	2004, 2006, 2009, 2010, 2011	M
17	(Brazil) Romulo Barral	5	0	5	2007, 2009, 2012, 2013, 2014	M
17	(Brazil) Rubens Charles	5	0	5	2006, 2007, 2008, 2009, 2017	M
17	(Brazil) André Galvão	5	0	5	2005, 2008, 2014, 2016, 2008	M
17	(Brazil) Ana Carolina Vieira	5	0	5	2017, 2018, 2019, 2021, 2022	F
17	(Brazil) Andressa Cintra	5	0	5	2019, 2021, 2022, 2023, 2024	F
17	(Brazil) Diego "Pato" Oliveira Batista	5	0	5	2021, 2023, 2024, 2025, 2026	M
28	(Lithuania) Dominyka Obelenyte	4	2	2	2015, 2016	F
28	(Brazil) Kyra Gracie	4	1	3	2006, 2008, 2010	F
28	(Brazil) Bernardo Faria	4	1	3	2010, 2013, 2015	M
28	(Brazil) Royler Gracie	4	0	4	1996, 1997, 1998, 1999	M
28	(Brazil) Roberto Magalhães	4	0	4	1996, 1997, 1998, 2000	M
28	(Brazil) Fábio Gurgel	4	0	4	1996, 1997, 2000, 2001	M
28	(Brazil) Guilherme Mendes	4	0	4	2009, 2011, 2012, 2014	M
28	(Japan) Rikako Yuasa	4	0	4	1996, 1997, 1998, 1999	F
28	(United States) Mikey Musumeci	4	0	4	2017, 2018, 2019, 2021	M
28	(Brazil) Tainan Dalpra	4	0	4	2021, 2022, 2025, 2026	M
28	(Brazil) Victor Hugo	4	1	3	2021, 2022, 2023	M
39	(Brazil) Márcio Cruz	3	2	1	2002, 2003	M
39	(Brazil) Ronaldo Souza	3	2	1	2004, 2005	M
39	(Brazil) Mário Sperry	3	1	2	1996, 1997, 1998	M
39	(Brazil) Nicholas Meregali	3	1	2	2017, 2019, 2022	M
39	(Brazil) Vítor Ribeiro	3	0	3	1999, 2000, 2001	M
39	(Brazil) Marcio Feitosa	3	0	3	1997, 2001, 2002	M
39	(Brazil) Daniele Piermatei	3	0	3	2002, 2003, 2004	F
39	(Brazil) Alessandra Vieira	3	0	3	2000, 2002, 2005	F
39	(Brazil) Poliana Lago	3	0	3	2003, 2004, 2005	F
39	(Brazil) Rosângela Conceição	3	0	3	1998, 2003, 2005	F
39	(Brazil) Fredson Paixão	3	0	3	2001, 2002, 2005	M
39	(Brazil) Bibiano Fernandes	3	0	3	2003, 2005, 2006	M
39	(Brazil) Celso Vinicius	3	0	3	2005, 2006, 2008	M
39	(Brazil) Braulio Estima	3	0	3	2004, 2006, 2009	M
39	(Brazil) Ana Laura Cordeiro	3	0	3	2008, 2014, 2015	F
39	(Brazil) Michael Langhi	3	0	3	2009, 2010, 2015	M
39	(Brazil) Gezary Matuda	3	0	3	2013, 2014, 2016	F
39	(Brazil) Fernanda Mazzelli	3	0	3	2012, 2015, 2016	F
39	(Brazil) Otávio Souza	3	0	3	2012, 2013, 2016	M
39	(Brazil) Claudia do Val	3	0	3	2017, 2018, 2019	F
39	(Brazil) Luiza Monteiro	3	0	3	2015, 2017, 2024	F
39	(Brazil) Gustavo Batista	3	0	3	2021, 2023, 2024	M
39	(Brazil) Matheus Gabriel	3	0	3	2019, 2025, 2026	M
39	(Brazil) Jansen Gomes	3	0	3	2023, 2025, 2026	M
62	(Brazil) Amaury Bitetti	2	2	0	1996, 1997	M
62	(Brazil) Rodrigo Medeiros	2	2	0	1999, 2000	M
62	(Brazil) Fernando Pontes	2	1	1	2001	M
62	(United States) Lana Stefanac	2	1	1	2009	F
62	(Brazil) Tayane Porfírio	2	1	1	2017	F
62	(Brazil) Roberto Traven	2	0	2	1998, 1999	M
62	(Brazil) Alessandra Oliveira	2	0	2	1999, 2000	F
62	(Brazil) Omar Salum	2	0	2	1999, 2000	M
62	(Brazil) Leo Leite	2	0	2	1999, 2000	M
62	(Brazil) Fernando Augusto	2	0	2	2000, 2003	M
62	(Brazil) Mirela Cortes	2	0	2	2002, 2004	F
62	(Brazil) Mario Reis	2	0	2	2003, 2004	M
62	(Brazil) Daniel Moraes	2	0	2	2003, 2004	M
62	(Brazil) Fabrício Werdum	2	0	2	2003, 2004	M
62	(Brazil) Samuel Braga	2	0	2	2005, 2008	M
62	(South Africa) Penny Thomas	2	0	2	2007, 2009	F
62	(Brazil) Gabriel Vella	2	0	2	2002, 2009	M
62	(Brazil) Sérgio Moraes	2	0	2	2008, 2011	M
62	(Brazil) Antônio Braga Neto	2	0	2	2008, 2011	M
62	(Brazil) Leo Nogueira	2	0	2	2011, 2012	M
62	(Brazil) Caio Terra	2	0	2	2008, 2013	M
62	(Brazil) Gabriel Moraes	2	0	2	2004, 2013	M
62	(United States) Mackenzie Dern	2	0	2	2015, 2016	F
62	(Finland) Venla Luukkonen	2	0	2	2014, 2018	F
62	(Brazil) Gabriel Arges	2	0	2	2017, 2019	M
62	(Brazil) Felipe Pena	2	0	2	2018, 2019	M
62	(Brazil) Anna Rodrigues	2	0	2	2021, 2022	F
62	(Brazil) Kaynan Duarte	2	0	2	2021, 2022	M
62	(Brazil) Melissa Cueto	2	0	2	2021, 2023	F
62	(United Kingdom) Ffion Davies	2	0	2	2022, 2023	F
62	(Brazil) Bianca Basílio	2	0	2	2022, 2023	F
62	(Brazil) Meyram Maquine	2	0	2	2022, 2024	M
62	(Poland) Adam Wardziński	2	0	2	2024, 2025	M
62	(Brazil) Larissa Dias	2	0	2	2022, 2025	F
62	(Brazil) Thamara Ferreira	2	0	2	2024, 2025	F
62	(Morocco) Seif-Eddine Houmine	2	0	2	2024, 2026	M
62	(United States) Michael Jalen Fonacier	2	0	2	2025, 2026	M
99	(Brazil) Felipe Andrew	1	1	0	2021	M
99	(Brazil) Renato Barreto	1	0	1	1996	M
99	(Brazil) Helio Moreira	1	0	1	1996	M
99	(Brazil) Paulo Barroso	1	0	1	1996	M
99	(Brazil) Roberto Correa	1	0	1	1996	M
99	(Brazil) Ricardo Liborio	1	0	1	1996	M
99	(Angola) João Roque	1	0	1	1997	M
99	(Brazil) Luis Guilherme	1	0	1	1997	M
99	(Brazil) Tais Ramos	1	0	1	1998	F
99	(Brazil) Marcelo Pereira	1	0	1	1998	M
99	(Brazil) Leo Vieira	1	0	1	1998	M
99	(Brazil) Fernando Vasconcelos	1	0	1	1998	M
99	(Brazil) Rafael Correa	1	0	1	1998	M
99	(Brazil) Cristina Pereira	1	0	1	1999	F
99	(Brazil) Alexandre Paiva	1	0	1	1999	M
99	(Brazil) Murilo Bustamante	1	0	1	1999	M
99	(Brazil) Daniella Figuerdo	1	0	1	2000	F
99	(Brazil) Renata Pimentel	1	0	1	2000	F
99	(Brazil) Erika Paes	1	0	1	2000	F
99	(United States) B.J. Penn	1	0	1	2000	M
99	(Brazil) Ana Michelle	1	0	1	2001	F
99	(Brazil) Claudia Oliveira	1	0	1	2001	F
99	(Brazil) Juliana Vieira	1	0	1	2001	F
99	(Brazil) Ana Carolina Ferreira	1	0	1	2001	F
99	(Brazil) Bernardo Pitel	1	0	1	2001	M
99	(Brazil) Ricardo Vieira	1	0	1	2001	M
99	(Brazil) Fernando Marques	1	0	1	2001	M
99	(Brazil) Virginia Maria	1	0	1	2002	F
99	(Brazil) Marcos Norat	1	0	1	2002	M
99	(Brazil) Carlos Lemos	1	0	1	2002	M
99	(Brazil) Delson Heleno	1	0	1	2002	M
99	(Brazil) Fábio Leopoldo	1	0	1	2002	F
99	(Brazil) Andrezza Pinho	1	0	1	2003	F
99	(Brazil) Felipe Costa	1	0	1	2003	M
99	(Brazil) Cassio Werneck	1	0	1	2003	M
99	(Brazil) Jefferson Moura	1	0	1	2003	M
99	(Brazil) Erik Wanderley	1	0	1	2003	M
99	(Brazil) Fernando Vieira	1	0	1	2004	M
99	(United States) Robert Drysdale	1	0	1	2005	M
99	(Brazil) Francisco Fernandes	1	0	1	2005	M
99	(Brazil) Caroline de Lazzerok	1	0	1	2006	F
99	(Brazil) Luiza Fernandes	1	0	1	2006	F
99	(Brazil) Daniel Otero	1	0	1	2006	M
99	(Brazil) Gabriel Gonzaga	1	0	1	2006	M
99	(France) Laurence Cousin	1	0	1	2007	F
99	(Canada) Emily Kwok	1	0	1	2007	F
99	(Brazil) Lucas Leite	1	0	1	2007	M
99	(United States) Rafael Lovato Jr.	1	0	1	2007	M
99	(Brazil) Mirriam Cerqueira	1	0	1	2008	F
99	(United States) Hillary Williams	1	0	1	2010	F
99	(Brazil) Pablo Silva	1	0	1	2010	M
99	(Brazil) Tarsis Humphreys	1	0	1	2010	M
99	(Brazil) Rodrigo Cavaca	1	0	1	2010	M
99	(Brazil) Talita Nogueira	1	0	1	2011	F
99	(Brazil) Gilbert Burns	1	0	1	2011	M
99	(Brazil) Marina Ribeiro	1	0	1	2013	F
99	(Brazil) Augusto Mendes	1	0	1	2013	M
99	(Japan) Shiho Yaginuma	1	0	1	2014	F
99	(Sweden) Janni Larsson	1	0	1	2014	F
99	(Brazil) Paulo Miyao	1	0	1	2015	M
99	(Brazil) Claudio Calasans	1	0	1	2015	M
99	(Brazil) Gabriel Lucas	1	0	1	2015	M
99	(Brazil) Monique Elias	1	0	1	2016	F
99	(Brazil) Ary Farias	1	0	1	2016	M
99	(Brazil) Alexandro Ceconi	1	0	1	2016	M
99	(Brazil) Talita Alencar	1	0	1	2017	F
99	(Sweden) Maxine Thylin	1	0	1	2017	F
99	(Brazil) Erberth Santos	1	0	1	2017	M
99	(Brazil) Amanda Monteiro	1	0	1	2018	F
99	(Brazil) Karen Antunes	1	0	1	2018	F
99	(United States) Jamil Hill	1	0	1	2018	M
99	(Brazil) Isaque Bahiense	1	0	1	2018	M
99	(Brazil) Lucas Barbosa	1	0	1	2018	M
99	(Brazil) Mahamed Aly	1	0	1	2018	M
99	(United States) Tammi Musumeci	1	0	1	2019	F
99	(Brazil) Ana Carolina Schmitt	1	0	1	2019	F
99	(Brazil) João Miyao	1	0	1	2019	M
99	(Brazil) Gabrielle McComb	1	0	1	2021	F
99	(Brazil) Fabrício Andrey	1	0	1	2021	M
99	(Brazil) Renato Canuto	1	0	1	2021	M
99	(Brazil) Thalison Soares	1	0	1	2022	M
99	(United States) Isaac Doederlein	1	0	1	2022	M
99	(United States) Tye Ruotolo	1	0	1	2022	M
99	(Cambodia) Jessa Khan	1	0	1	2023	F
99	(United States) Amy Campo	1	0	1	2023	F
99	(Brazil) Thamires Aquino	1	0	1	2024	F
99	(Brazil) Nathalie Ribeiro	1	0	1	2024	F
99	(Brazil) Tamiris Silva	1	0	1	2024	F
99	(United States) Mia Funegra	1	0	1	2025	F
99	(Brazil) Larissa Campos	1	0	1	2025	F
99	(Brazil) Janaina Lebre	1	0	1	2025	F
99	(Brazil) Thalyta "Thata" Silva	1	0	1	2025	F
99	(Brazil) Lucas Pinheiro	1	0	1	2023	M
99	(Brazil) Samuel Nagai	1	0	1	2023	M
99	(Brazil) Johnatha Alves	1	0	1	2023	M
99	(Brazil) Fellipe Andrew	1	0	1	2023	M
99	(Brazil) Carlos 'Bebeto' Oliveira	1	0	1	2024	M
99	(Brazil) Micael Galvão	1	0	1	2024	M
99	(Brazil) Jackson Nagai	1	0	1	2024	M
99	(Brazil) Anderson Munis	1	0	1	2024	M
99	(Brazil) João "Bisnaga" Mendes	1	0	1	2025	M
99	(Brazil) Roosevelt Souza	1	0	1	2025	M

== List of titles by team ==
Year	Winning team
1997	Nova União (1/2)
1998	Alliance (1/17)
1999	Alliance (2/17)
2000	Gracie Barra (1/6)
2001	Nova União (2/2)
2002	Gracie Barra (2/6)
2003	Gracie Barra (3/6)
2004	Gracie Barra (4/6)
2005	Gracie Barra (5/6)
2006	Brasa (1/1)
2007	Gracie Barra (6/6)
2008	Alliance (3/17)
2009	Alliance (4/17)
2010	Alliance (5/17)
2011	Alliance (6/17)
2012	Alliance (7/17)
2013	Alliance (8/17)
2014	Alliance (9/17)
2015	Alliance (10/17)
2016	Alliance (11/17)
2017	Atos Jiu-Jitsu (1/1)
2018	Alliance (12/17)
2019	Alliance (13/17)
2021	CheckMat (1/1)
2022	Alliance(14/17)
2023	Dream Art (1/1)
2024	Alliance(15/17)
2025	Alliance(16/17)
2026	Alliance(16/17)

== Notable champions ==
- Marcus Almeida – 13x World Champion (6 absolute titles)
- Gabi Pessanha – 10x World Champion (6 absolute titles)
- Roger Gracie – 10x World Champion (3 absolute titles)
- Beatriz Mesquita – 10x World Champion (2 absolute titles)
- Bruno Malfacine – 10x Roosterweight World Champion
- Michelle Nicolini – 8x World Champion (1 absolute title)
- Leandro Lo – 8x World Champion (1 Absolute title)
- Alexandre Ribeiro – 7x World Champion (2 absolute titles)
- Leticia Ribeiro – 7x World Champion
- Gabi Garcia – 6x World Champion (2 absolute titles)
- Rafael Mendes – 6x World Champion
- Lucas Lepri – 6x World Champion
- Nathiely de Jesus – 5x World Champion (2 absolute titles)
- Rodolfo Vieira – 5x World Champion (1 absolute title)
- Luanna Alzuguir – 5x World Champion (1 absolute title)
- André Galvão – 5x World Champion
- Marcelo Garcia – 5x World Champion
- Rubens Charles Maciel – 5x World Champion
- Robson Moura – 5x World Champion
- Saulo Ribeiro – 5x World Champion
- Romulo Barral – 5x World Champion
- Andressa Cintra – 5x World Champion
- Ana Carolina Vieira – 5x World Champion
- Bernardo Faria – 4x World Champion (1 absolute title)
- Victor Hugo – 4x World Champion (1 absolute title)
- Royler Gracie – 4x World Champion
- Guilherme Mendes – 4x World Champion
- Mikey Musumeci – 4x World Champion (first American to ever win multiple world titles and to ever win world titles in two different divisions)
- Ronaldo "Jacare" Souza – 3x World Champion (2 absolute titles)
- Luiza Monteiro - 3x World Champion
- Fabrício Werdum – 2x World Champion
- Melissa Cueto – 2x World Champion
- Ffion Davies – 2x World Champion (1st British/Welsh champion)
- João Roque – 1997 Light Featherweight World Champion (1st African & Non-Brazilian champion)
- B.J. Penn – 2000 Featherweight World Champion (1st American champion)
- Laurence Cousin – 2007 Featherweight World Champion (1st European/French & Non-Brazilian female champion)

== See also ==
- IBJJF
- Brazilian Jiu-Jitsu weight classes
- World IBJJF Jiu-Jitsu No-Gi Championship
- European IBJJF Jiu-Jitsu Championship
- European IBJJF Jiu-Jitsu No-Gi Championship
- Pan IBJJF Jiu-Jitsu Championship
- Pan IBJJF Jiu-Jitsu No-Gi Championship
- Brazilian National Jiu-Jitsu Championship
- Brazilian Nationals Jiu-Jitsu No-Gi Championship
- Asian IBJJF Jiu Jitsu Championship
