= 2008 World Jiu-Jitsu Championship =

Brazilian Jiu-Jitsu competitions

- Venue: California State University
- Location: (United States) Long Beach, California
- Dates: 5–8 June 2008
- Website: IBJJF

The 2008 World Jiu-Jitsu Championship was held at California State University in Long Beach, California, United States.

== Results ==
=== Academy Results ===
	Juvenile	Female	Adult
1º	Godoi JJ Club	Gracie Humaitá	Alliance
2º	Alliance	Gracie Barra	Gracie Humaitá
3º	Soul Fighters	Alliance	Gracie Barra

=== Men's Black Belt ===
Weight Division	Champion (Gold)		Finalist (Silver)	
Weight Division	Name	Team	Name	Team
Absolute	Alexandre Ribeiro	Gracie Humaita	Roger Gracie	Gracie Barra
Super Super Heavyweight	Roger Gracie	Gracie Barra	Leonardo Leite	Brasa Jiu-Jitsu
Super Heavyweight	Antonio Braga Neto	Gordo Jiu-Jitsu	Rafael Lovato Jr.	Gracie Humaita
Heavyweight	Alexandre Ribeiro	Gracie Humaita	Alexandre Souza	Gracie Florianópolis
Medium Heavyweight	Andre Galvao	Brasa Jiu-Jitsu	Braulio Estima	Gracie Barra
Middleweight	Sergio Morais	Alliance Jiu-Jitsu	Willian Cooper	Alliance Jiu-Jitsu
Lightweight	Celso Vinicius	Ryan Gracie Jiu-Jitsu	Lucas Lepri	Alliance Jiu-Jitsu
Featherweight	Rubens Charles Maciel	Alliance Jiu-Jitsu	Bruno Fazatto	Brasa Jiu-Jitsu
Super Featherweight	Samuel Braga	Gracie Barra	Dai Yoshioka	Tokyo Yellowmans
Roosterweight	Caio Terra	Cesar Gracie Jiu-Jitsu	Yusuke Honna	Paraestra

=== Women's Brown/Black Belt ===
Weight Division	Champion (Gold)		Finalist (Silver)	
Weight Division	Name	Team	Name	Team
Absolute	Kyra Gracie	Gracie Barra	Ana Laura Cordeiro	Gracie Barra
Heavyweight	Gabrielle Garcia	Triumph	Maria do Carmo	Carmen Cascagrossa
Medium Heavyweight	Ana Laura Cordeiro	Gracie Barra	Penny Thomas	Gracie Humaita
Middleweight	Hannette Staack	Carlson Gracie Team	Fernando Mazzelli	Agnaldo Goes
Lightweight	Kyra Gracie	Gracie Barra	Luana Alzuguir	Barbosa JJ
Featherweight	Bianca Barreto	Gracie Barra America	Laurence Cousin	Behring
Super Featherweight	Mirian Cerqueira	UGF	Takako Abe	Paraestra
