= Penny Thomas =

Brazilian jiu-jitsu practitioner from South Africa

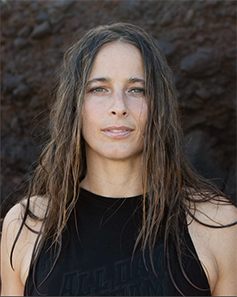
- Born: 2 July 1979 (age 47); Durban, South Africa
- Weight: 150 lb (68 kg; 10 st 10 lb)
- Division: Medium Heavyweight: Gi weight classes; −74 kg (163.1 lb); No-Gi weight classes; −71.5 kg (157.6 lb)
- Style: Brazilian Jiu-Jitsu
- Team: Gracie Humaita; Maui Jiu Jitsu; Rickson Gracie; Nova Gen BJJ
- Teachers: Leticia Ribeiro; Luis Heredia; Micah Atkinson
- Rank: 3rd deg. BJJ black belt (Note: Under Luis Herédia)

Other information
- Occupation: Brazilian jiu-jitsu instructor Yoga instructor

Penny Thomas (born 2 July 1979) is a South African submission grappler and 3rd degree Brazilian jiu-jitsu (BJJ) black belt practitioner and coach. After opening South Africa's first jiu-jitsu academy in her garage, Thomas won two BJJ world champion titles. Subsequently, she relocated to the United States, where she trained under the guidance of Luis Heredia and later Leticia Ribeiro.

Throughout her career, Thomas became four-time black belt Brazilian jiu-jitsu world champion, two-time Pan American champion, World No-Gi champion, FILA World grappling champion, Grapplers Quest world champion and ADCC Submission Wrestling world champion.

Considered a pioneer in the sport, Thomas is the first jiu jitsu black belt from the African continent and the first South African black belt world champion.

== Career ==
Penny Thomas was born in Durban, South Africa on 2 July 1979. She started training gymnastics from age 5, becoming part of the South African Junior Olympic team by age 12. Following spinal surgery, she was compelled to leave gymnastics, but kept practicing a variety of sports.

=== Early career ===
In 2001, while training in kickboxing, Thomas was introduced to Brazilian jiu-jitsu (BJJ) by Micah Atkinson. At the time, South Africa lacked formal BJJ schools or qualified instructors, and Atkinson had been practicing with his brother using Carlson Gracie instructional VHS tapes. After Atkinson received his blue belt from Royce Gracie in London, Thomas and he decided to open the country's first jiu-jitsu academy in her garage.

Thomas began traveling to Brazil to train, becoming the first South African female to receive a blue belt in Brazilian jiu-jitsu. After she started competing she won the 2004 World Jiu-Jitsu Championship as a blue belt, winning the title again as a purple belt the following year. In 2006, she left her career as a software developer and relocated to Hawaii to train under the tutelage of 5th degree black belt Luis Heredia.

Thomas's dedication to the sport, and the lack of female competitors at the time, led her to sometimes compete against male opponents. In 2007, she earned a silver medal while participating in the Men's Gi brown belt division of the 2007 Triple Crown Aloha State BJJ Championship. That same year, Thomas won the 2007 World Jiu-Jitsu Championship, becoming the first non-Brazilian athlete, alongside Laurence Cousin and Emily Kwok, to win her division in the brown/black belt category; she then won the Pan American championship and the world No-Gi championship. (Note: brown and black division)

=== Black belt career ===
In 2007, Thomas relocated to San Diego to train under Leticia Ribeiro, joining the Gracie Humaita female team; in May of that year, she became ADCC Submission Fighting World champion, after defeating Lana Stefanac in the final. In 2008, Thomas received her black belt from Heredia, becoming the first person from the African continent to attain a BJJ black belt.

At the 2009 ADCC World held in Barcelona, Spain, Thomas won a silver medal after defeating Shanti Abelha in the quarter-final and Cris Cyborg in the semi-final, before losing by leglock to Hannette Staack in the final. In March 2009, she secured her second world championship title after defeating Valerie Worthington in the medium heavyweight final.

During Grappler's Quest women's superfight at UFC Expo in Las Vegas in May 2010, she submitted Shayna Baszler via rear naked choke. At the 2010 IBJJF World Championship, competing under Gracie Humaita, she won silver in the brown and black belt medium heavy division, losing to Michelle Nicolini by 3×2 advantage points in the final; the following year, she participated in the 2011 Abu Dhabi World Professional Jiu-Jitsu Championship, earning a silver medal after a points-based loss in the Women's +65 kg final against Gabi Garcia.

At the 2011 ADCC World, Thomas secured a win in the first round against Talita Nogueira with a rear naked choke, before facing Gabi Garcia who won the match after securing a shoulder crush from side control; Thomas then suffered a knee injury during the bronze match against Ida Hansson, finishing the championship in fourth place. That year she competed at the 2011 IBJJF World, winning silver in her division (medium heavyweight) after losing to Talita Nogueira in the final; competing also in openweight she won bronze after facing Gabrielle Garcia in the semi-finals. At the 2012 IBJJF World Championship, she won silver after losing to Fernanda Mazzeli in the middle heavyweight final.

In 2012, Thomas won the FILA world grappling championship. The following year, she received an invitation to compete at the 2013 ADCC World championship in Beijing, China, where she faced defeat against Maria Małyjasiak. After a hiatus from competition, Thomas made a comeback in 2019, winning a silver medal in the medium heavyweight category at the IBJJF World Master Championship.

== Personal life ==
Outside of grappling, Thomas has won a prestigious advanced mathematics tournament and has received multiple awards for her artworks.

== Championships and accomplishments ==
=== Brazilian jiu-jitsu ===
Main achievements at black belt level

- 2 x IBJJF World Champion (2009, 2007)
- IBJJF Pan America Champion (2007)
- IBJJF World No-Gi Champion (2007)
- 2nd place IBJJF World Championship (2011, 2010, 2008)
- 2nd place IBJJF Pan America Championship (2009)
- 2nd place IBJJF World Championship (2012)
- 2nd place IBJJF World No-Gi Championship (2008)
- 2nd place IBJJF World Masters Championship (2019)
- 3rd place IBJJF World Championship (2011 (Note: Absolute/Openweight))

Main achievements (lower belts)

- 2 x IBJJF World Champion (2005 purple, 2004 blue)
- IBJJF Pan America Champion (2006 purple
- CBJJO World Cup Champion (2006 purple)
- Gracie Worlds Champion (2006 purple / brown / black belt)
- 2nd place IBJJF World Championship (2003 blue)
- 2nd place Triple Crown Aloha State BJJ Championship (2007 Men’s brown belt division)

=== Grappling ===
Main achievements:

- ADCC Submission Fighting World Champion (2007)
- ADCC North American Champion (2010)
- FILA World Grappling Champion (2012)
- NAGA Hawaii, Advanced Gi & No-Gi Champion (2007)
- South African National Grappling Champion (2005)
- Grapplers Quest Superfight Champion (2010 Las Vegas, 2010 Boston)
- Grapplers Quest No-Gi Champion (2009 Del Mar & LV – open weight, 2008 LV & NJ)
- 2nd place ADCC Submission Fighting World Championship (2009)
- 4th place ADCC Submission Fighting World Championship (2011)

== Instructor lineage ==
Mitsuyo Maeda > Carlos Gracie Sr. > Helio Gracie > Rickson Gracie > Luis Herédia > Penny Thomas
