= Maxine Thylin =

Brazilian jiu-jitsu practitioner from Sweden

- Born: 5 June 1991 (age 35)
- Nickname: Machine
- Nationality: Swedish
- Division: Gi Weight Classes; Feather -58.5 kg
- Style: Brazilian Jiu-Jitsu
- Team: Gracie Humaitá
- Trainer: Leticia Ribeiro
- Rank: BJJ black belt

Maxine Thylin (born 5 June 1991) is a Swedish grappler and Brazilian jiu-jitsu black belt competitor. Thylin is a multiple Brazilian jiu-jitsu world champion in coloured belt and the 2017 black belt World Champion.

== Career ==
Emilie Maxine M. H. Thylin was born on 5 June 1991, in Sweden, when she was 10 years old she started training and competing in Japanese jujutsu, at sixteen she added Brazilian jiu-jitsu to her practice. At 18 years she won the junior Japanese jujutsu world championship and decided to focus on Brazilian jiu-jitsu, training at Nacka dojo in Stockholm. From 2010 she began travelling to California to train with Leticia Ribeiro a few months at time, then in 2015 moved from Sweden to San Diego joining Gracie Southbay Jiu-Jitsu. Thylin won medals in all the major tournaments, as a brown belt she won the 2015 World Championship receiving her black belt from Ribeiro that year as a consequence, followed by a win at the SJJIF World Championship. In 2017 she won the world championship as a black belt, while studying psychology, she is the second swede to win the world championship after Janni Larsson.

== Brazilian Jiu-Jitsu competitive summary ==
Main Achievements at black belt level:

- IBJJF World Champion (2017)
- 2 x UAEJJF Grand Slam winner, Los Angeles (2016 / 2015)
- 2nd place IBJJF Pan Championship (2017)
- 2nd place IBJJF European Open (2017)
- 3rd place IBJJF No-Gi World Championship (2015 (Note: Weight and absolute))
- 3rd place IBJJF European Open (2018)
- 3rd place IBJJF Pan Championship (2018)

Main Achievements (Coloured Belts):

- IBJJF World Champion (2015 brown)
- IBJJF World Champion NoGi (2014 brown)
- 2 x Pan American Champion (2011 / 2012 purple)
- European Champion (2014 brown)
- 2nd place IBJJF World Championship (2010 purple)
- 2nd place Pan American Championship (2013 purple)
- 2nd place IBJJF European Open (2012 / 2013 purple)
- 3rd place IBJJF World Championship (2009 blue)
- 3rd place IBJJF Pan Championship (2014 / 2015 brown)
- 3rd place IBJJF European Open (2011 purple)

== Instructor lineage ==
Carlos Gracie > Helio Gracie > Royler Gracie > Vini Aieta > Letícia Ribeiro > Maxine Thylin
