= Danielle Piermatei =

Brazilian jiu-jitsu practitioner from Brazil

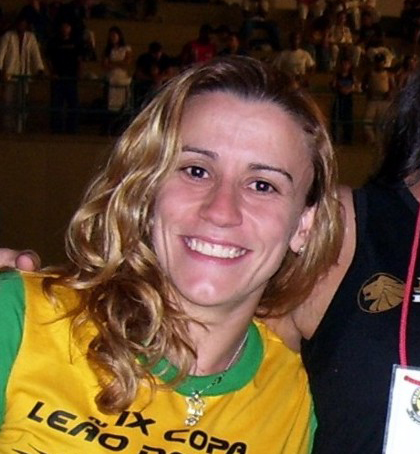
- Born: Danielle Piermatei Silva; April 23, 1980 (age 46); Belo Horizonte, Brazil
- Style: Brazilian Jiu-Jitsu
- Team: Leao Dourado
- Teacher: Hilton Leão
- Rank: 5th degree black belt in BJJ (Note: Piermatei was a 2nd degree black belt in 2008 and a 5th degree black belt in 2022)

Other information
- Occupation: Brazilian jiu-jitsu instructor

Danielle Piermatei Silva (born 23 April 1980, in Belo Horizonte, Brazil) is a 5th degree Brazilian jiu-jitsu (BJJ) black belt practitioner and instructor. Piermatei is a three-time IBJJF World Champion.

== Career ==
Danielle Piermatei Silva was born on 23 April 1980, in Belo Horizonte, Brazil. She started training Brazilian jiu-jitsu (BJJ) at age 5 with her father, BJJ grandmaster and president of the Brazilian Jiu-Jitsu League, Hilton Leão, earning her black belt from him. In 2003 Piermatei won the World Jiu-Jitsu Championship after defeating Elidiane Pereira in the Light Feather final winning gold again in 2004 and 2005 against Elidiane Pereira.

In 2007 she received her 2nd degree in jiu-jitsu and later graduated with a bachelor's degree in Physical Education from Universidade Salgado de Oliveira. In 2008 she won gold at the first Rio International Open of Jiu-Jitsu in the featherweight category. In the same year she was approved by the CBJJ in the arbitration course. In 2009 she won gold at the Brazilian Championship of Sport Jiu-Jitsu.

In July 2009 she was invited to Abu Dhabi to teach women Brazilian jiu-jitsu alongside fellow black belt Carol de Lazzer.

== Brazilian Jiu-Jitsu competitive summary ==
Main Achievements (Black Belt)

- 3 x IBJJF World Champion (2003 / 2004 / 2005)
