= Carlos Lemos =

Carlos Lemos may refer to:

- Carlos Lemos (fighter), Brazilian martial artist
- Carlos Lemos (actor) (1909–1988), Spanish actor
- Carlos Lemos (athlete) (born 1988), Colombian sprinter
- Carlos Lemos (film editor), Argentine film editor
- Carlos Lemos Simmonds (1933–2003), 6th Vice President of Colombia
- Guinga (Carlos Althier de Souza Lemos Escobar, born 1950), Brazilian musician
