= Rikako Yuasa =

Brazilian jiu-jitsu practitioner from Japan

- Born: Rikako Yuasa; 12 April 1991 (age 35); Saitama, Japan
- Nickname: Lady Sasa
- Nationality: Japanese
- Division: GI Weight Classes: Rooster (-48.5 kg); Light feather (-53.5 kg)
- Style: Brazilian Jiu-Jitsu
- Team: Dragon`s Den; Paraestra Shinagawa
- Trainer: Yukinori Sasa
- Rank: BJJ black belt

Rikako Yuasa (湯浅麗歌子, Rikako Yuasa); born 12 April 1991) is a submission grappler and Brazilian jiu-jitsu (BJJ) black belt competitor. Regarded by some as one of the greatest Japanese BJJ fighters, Yuasa is a World, European and Asian champion in coloured belt and a four times black belt World champion.

== Career ==
Rikako Yuasa was born on 12 April 1991 in Saitama, Japan. She started Swimming from the age of four, by the time she reached sixth grade she was selected to participate in the Junior Olympics. In secondary school she started Freestyle Wrestling and Kodokan Judo. Looking for a gym she joined Pogona club, an MMA in Kawaguchi, where she discovered Brazilian Jiu-Jitsu. She started training under Ichiro Kaneko. In October 2008 she was promoted to the blue belt then purple the following year in October 2009. In December 2010 she started competing in Grappling at a Tokyo JEWELS event. As a purple belt she won the 2012 European Championship and the 2012 Asian Championship (in both her weight division and in Absolute) finishing third at the World Championship in the Open Weight division. In September 2013, she was promoted to brown belt and joined Paraestra team, one of the first and best grappling academies in Japan where she started training under Yukinori Sasa, the first Japanese to win the World Jiu-Jitsu Championship.

In 2014 Yuasa won her first world title as a brown belt and was promoted that same year to black belt by Sasa on 7 June 2014. As a black belt she won the 2015 World Championship for the first time after defeating Gezary Matuda for the lightfeather title becoming the first Japanese athlete to become a BJJ black belt world champion. In Submission Grappling she won the 2015 ADCC Submission Grappling Asia then proceeded to win gold again at the World Jiu-Jitsu Championship in 2016, 2017 and 2018, also winning in 2017 and 2019 ADCC Asia two more times. Competing in local grappling tournaments she fought at Quintet Fight Night 2 and 3 in Tokyo. That same year she won silver at the 2019 Abu Dhabi Grand Slam Tokyo losing by point in the final against Mayssa Bastos, then won gold at the IBJJF Asian championship and silver at the world championship.

== Brazilian Jiu-Jitsu competitive summary ==
Main Achievements (Black Belt)

- IBJJF World Champion (2018 / 2017 / 2016 / 2015)
- IBJJF Asian Champion (2019)
- 2nd place IBJJF World Championship (2019)
- 2nd place IBJJF Asian Open (2015)
- 2nd place Abu Dhabi World Pro (2016 / 2017)
- 2nd Place Abu Dhabi Grand Slam Tokyo (2016 / 2019)

Main Achievements (Coloured Belts)

- IBJJF World Champion (2014 brown)
- IBJJF European Champion (2012 purple)
- IBJJF Asian Champion (2012 (Note: Weight and absolute) purple)
- 2nd place IBJJF Pan Championship (2012 purple)
- 3rd place IBJJF World Championship (2011 purple)
- 3rd place IBJJF Pan Championship (2012 (Note: Absolute) purple)

== Instructor lineage ==
Mitsuyo Maeda > Carlos Gracie Sr. > Carlos Gracie Junior > Yuki Nakai >Yukinori Sasa > Rikako Yuasa
