= Larissa Dias =

Brazilian jiu-jitsu competitor from Brazil (born 1998)

- Born: 3 September 1998 (age 28); Rio de Janeiro, Brazil
- Other names: Larissa Dias De Almeida
- Division: Heavy −79.3 kg
- Team: MJN Jiu-Jitsu
- Rank: BJJ black belt (Note: Under Vinícius Marinho)

Larissa de Almeida commonly known as Larissa Dias (born 3 September 1998 in Rio de Janeiro, Brazil) is a Brazilian Jiu Jitsu (BJJ) black belt competitor. Dias is a 2022 World Jiu-Jitsu and 2023 Pan Jiu-Jitsu heavyweight champion.

== Career ==
Larissa Dias was born on 3 September 1998, in Rio de Janeiro, Brazil, growing up in the Meiér neighborhood. At the age of 17, she joined black belt world champion Vinicius Marinho's Brazilian jiu-jitsu class at the local GF Team Academy.

Dias started competing at the national stage for the first time in 2018, winning the CBJJ Brazilian Nationals as a white belt. After her coach moved to Qatar she joined the Dream Art Project, where she earned her brown belt training under Isaque Bahiense and later becoming part of coach Melqui Galvão's squad while maintaining her connection with Marinho.

=== Black belt career ===
After an impressive journey in the colored belt divisions, where she won World, Pan, and South American titles on the International Brazilian Jiu-Jitsu Federation (IBJJF) circuit, she was promoted to black belt by Marinho on 24 November 2021. The following year she won the 2022 World Jiu-Jitsu Championship, defeating Rafaela Guedes in the final.

Dias won a bronze medal in the heavyweight division of the IBJJF World Championship 2024 on June 1, 2024. Dias then won both the heavyweight and absolute divisions at the IBJJF Fort Lauderdale Open 2024 on October 19, 2024. She then won a gold medal in the heavyweight division of the IBJJF Pan Championship 2025.

== Brazilian Jiu-Jitsu competitive summary ==
Main Achievements at black belt level:

- IBJJF World Champion (2022)
- IBJJF Pan Champion (2023)
- IBJJF American Nationals Champion (2022)
- AJP World Pro BRA Qualifier (2021)
- AJP Grand Slam Champion, Rio (2021)
- 3rd place IBJJF Pan Championship (2022)
- 3rd place AJP Abu Dhabi World Pro (2021)

Main Achievements (Coloured Belts):

- IBJJF World Champion (2019 purple)
- IBJJF Pan Champion (2021 brown)
- IBJJF South American Champion (2017 blue)
- IBJJF Brazilian Nationals Champion (2017 blue, 2019 purple)
- AJP Grand Slam Champion, Rio (2021 brown / black)
- AJP World Pro Brazilian Qualifiers (2021 brown / black)
- 2nd place IBJJF World Championships (2018 blue)
- 3rd place AJP Abu Dhabi World Pro (2021 brown / black)
