= Cassio Werneck =

Brazilian jiu-jitsu practitioner

Cássio Werneck
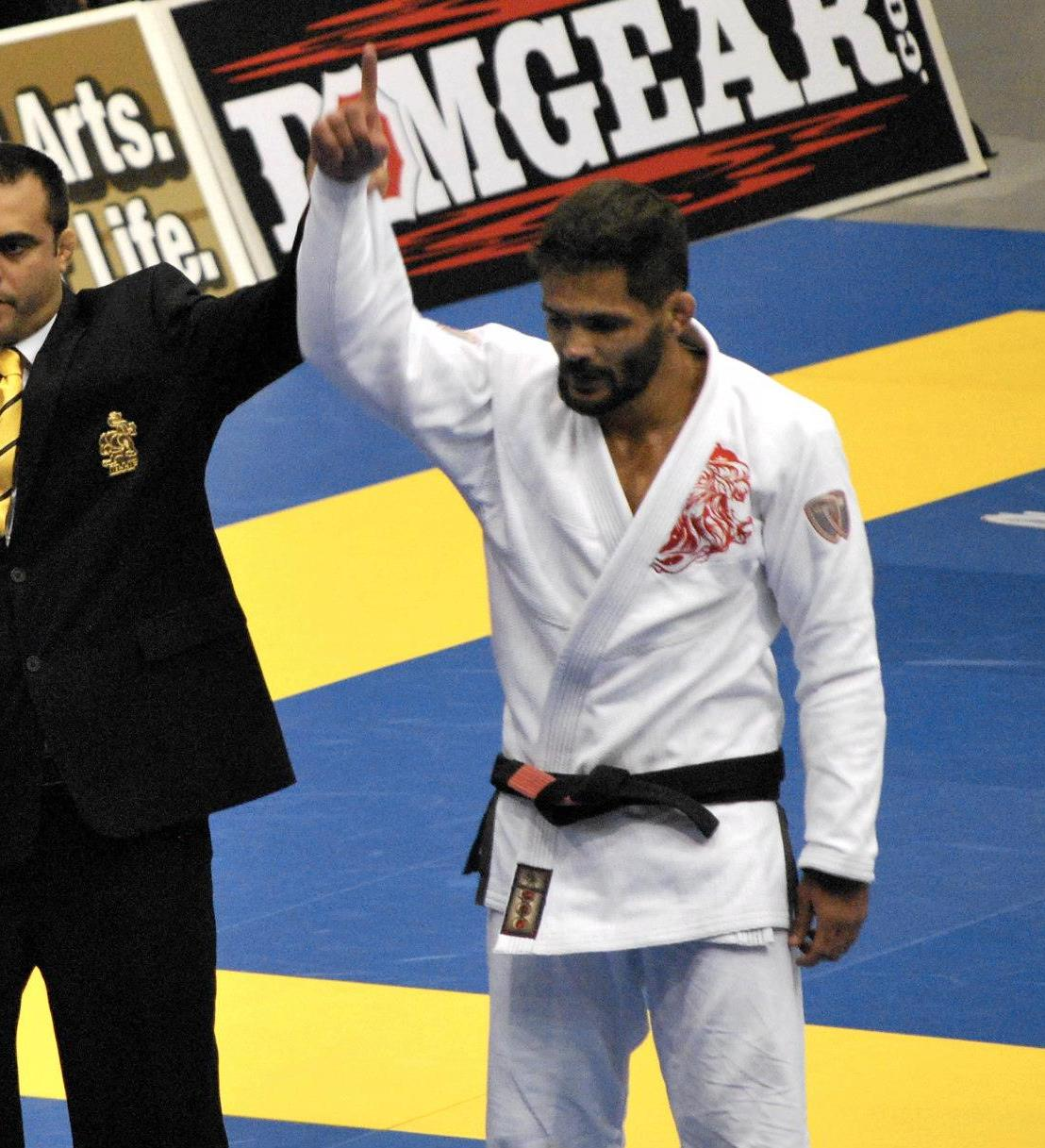
- Cassio Werneck Pan Jiu Jitsu Championship 2013, Gold Medal Victory
- Born: 17 February 1974 (age 52); Brazilia, Brazil
- Height: 1.76 m (5 ft 9 in)
- Weight: 78 kg (172 lb; 12.3 st)
- Style: Brazilian Jiu-Jitsu
- Rank: 6th deg. BJJ black belt

Other information
- Notable schools: Cassio Werneck BJJ, Sacramento CA
- Website: www.cassiowerneck.com

Cássio Werneck (born 17 February 1974) is a Brazilian Jiu-Jitsu competitor, instructor and owner of Cassio Werneck Brazilian Jiu-Jitsu located in Sacramento, California.

== Early years ==
Werneck began training in martial arts at 11 years old, practicing Capoeira for 4 years. He switched to grappling in 1991, moving to a Judo club where he was coached by sensei Miura. Cassio was exposed to more of the self-defence aspect of jiu-jitsu through Professor Sardella, a member of the Federal Police. In 1993, Werneck's focus turned to Brazilian Jiu-jitsu.

== Grappling career ==
Werneck fought in the Southern California Pro-Am Invitational 2003, where he beat Jeff Newton in the opening round before losing to Rener Gracie in the quarter-final. The match with Gracie drew attention due to a controversial finish, where Werneck claimed that he did not tap.

Werneck competed at the IBJJF Master World Championship on September 2, 2023, where he won the master 4 middleweight division.

== Teaching career ==
Athletes such as Randy Couture, Frank Mir, Dan Henderson and Urijah Faber have also trained under Cassio at his Sacramento location.

Cassio has conducted seminars in the Middle East as well as in the U.S. and Brazil.

== Championships ==
| Year | Placing | Event |
|---|---|---|
| 1994-2000 | 1st | Brazilian State Champion |
| 1995-2000 | 1st | Regional Jiu-Jitsu Championships |
| 1995 | 3rd | Brazilian National Championship |
| 1996 | 3rd | World Jiu-Jitsu Championship |
| 1997 | 2nd | World Jiu-Jitsu Championship |
| 1997 | 1st | Pan American Jiu-Jitsu Championship |
| 1998 | 1st | Pan American Jiu-Jitsu Championship |
| 1998 | 3rd | Brazilian National Championship |
| 1999 | 3rd | Brazilian National Championship |
| 2000 | 3rd | Pan American Jiu-Jitsu Championship |
| 2001 | 3rd | Pan American Jiu-Jitsu Championship |
| 2002 | 1st | Brazilian Cup |
| 2002 | 1st | U.S. Open, Brazilian Jiu-Jitsu |
| 2003 | 1st | Pan American Jiu-Jitsu Championship |
| 2003 | 1st | World Jiu-Jitsu Championship |
| 2004 | 1st | Pan American Jiu-Jitsu Championship Brazilian Team |
| 2004 | 2nd | Brazilian Jiu-Jitsu World Cup |
| 2004 | 2nd | World Jiu-Jitsu Championship |
| 2005 | 1st | Pan American Jiu-Jitsu Championship Brazilian Team |
| 2005 | 2nd | Pan American Jiu-Jitsu Championship |
| 2008 | 1st | Pan American Jiu-Jitsu Middle-weight Championship |
| 2010 | 1st | Pan American Jiu-Jitsu Championship |
| 2012 | 1st | World Jiu-Jitsu Championship Masters & Seniors |
| 2012 | 1st | World Jiu-Jitsu No-Gi Championship |
| 2013 | 1st | Pan-American Championship |
| 2013 | 2nd | World Jiu-Jitsu Championship Masters & Seniors |
| 2015 | 1st | World Jiu-Jitsu Championship Masters & Seniors |
| 2016 | 1st | World Jiu-Jitsu Championship Masters & Seniors |
| 2017 | 1st | World Jiu-Jitsu Championship Masters & Seniors |
| 2018 | 2nd | World Jiu-Jitsu Championship Masters & Seniors |
| 2019 | 1st | World Jiu-Jitsu Championship Masters & Seniors |

== Mixed martial arts record ==
Professional record breakdown
| 2 matches | 2 wins | 0 losses |
| By submission | 2 | 0 |

| Res. | Record | Opponent | Method | Event | Date | Round | Time | Location | Notes |
|---|---|---|---|---|---|---|---|---|---|
| Win | 2-0 | Ashe Bowman | Submission (armbar) | WEC 20: Cinco de Mayhem | May 5, 2006 | 2 | 2:05 | Lemoore, California, United States | |
| Win | 1-0 | Toby Imada | Submission (triangle choke) | WEC 15 | May 19, 2005 | 2 | 2:54 | Lemoore, California, United States | |
