= Claudia do Val =

Brazilian jiu-jitsu practitioner

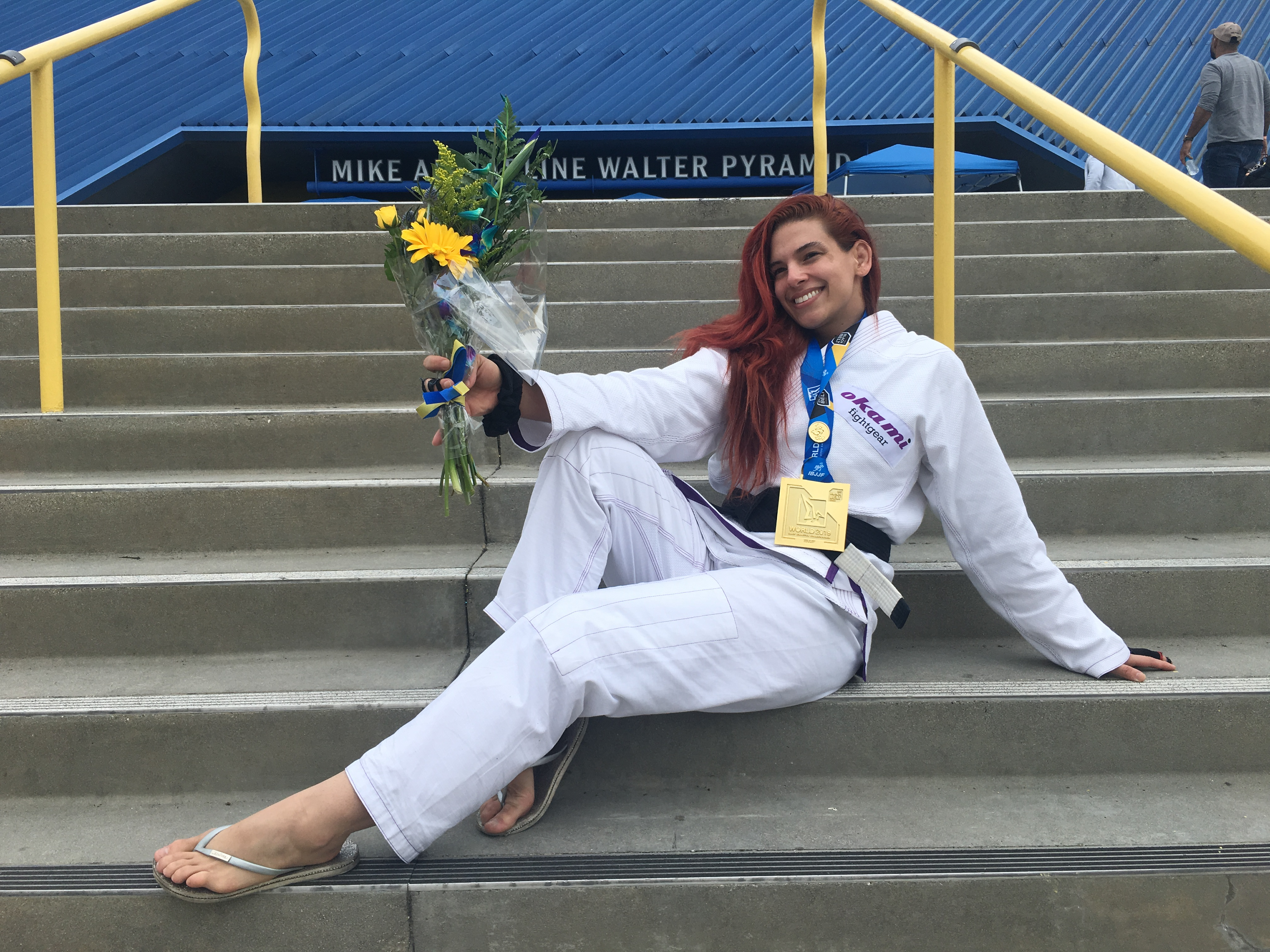
- Cláudia do Val Win IBJJF World Championship for the 3rd time in 2019
- Born: Cláudia Fernanda Onofre Valim do Val; 1 June 1988 (age 37); Resende, Rio de Janeiro, Rio de Janeiro, Brazil
- Team: Soul fighters
- Rank: Black belt in Brazilian Jiu-Jitsu

Claudia do Val
Medal record

Representing Brazil

Brazilian Jiu-Jitsu

World Championship
Gold medal – first place	2019 California, USA	Super-Heavy
Gold medal – first place	2018 California, USA	Medium-Heavy
Gold medal – first place	2017 California, USA	Heavy

Master World Jiu-Jitsu Championship
Gold medal – first place	2019 Las Vegas, USA	Medium-Heavy
Gold medal – first place	2018 Las Vegas, USA	Medium-Heavy
Gold medal – first place	2018 Las Vegas, USA	Absolute

Pan American Championship
Silver medal – second place	2017 California, USA	Medium
Gold medal – first place	2018 California, USA	Super - Heavy

European Championship
Silver medal – second place	2019 Lisbon, Portugal	Medium-Heavy
Gold medal – first place	2018 Lisbon, Portugal	Medium-Heavy
Gold medal – first place	2017 Lisbon, Portugal	Heavy

Brazilian National Championship
Silver medal – second place	2018 Barueri, Brazil	Absolute
Gold medal – first place	2018 Barueri, Brazil	Heavy
Bronze medal – third place	2017 Barueri, Brazil	Absolute
Gold medal – first place	2017 Barueri, Brazil	Heavy

Asian Open Championship
Gold medal – first place	2018 Tokyo, Japan	Heavy
Gold medal – first place	2018 Tokyo, Japan	Absolute

Claudia do Val is a professional Brazilian jiu-jitsu practitioner. She has won the World Jiu-Jitsu Championship three times, holding each title in a different category.

She was three times ranked No.1 IBJJF competitor in the Gi, 2018/2019 season and 2019/2020 season, and 2020/2021 season; as well as No.1 IBJJF NoGi competitor for the 2018, and 2019, and 2020 seasons.

Do Val won the IBJJF Grand Slam in 2018, which consists of the biggest tournaments of the year: European Championship, Pan Jiu-Jitsu Championship, Brazilian National Championship, and the World Championship.

Along with the success in the biggest Jiu jitsu competitions, she also holds over 60 gold medals from the smaller tournaments (all in the black belt level).

== Biography ==
Cláudia do Val started her Martial arts career in 2006 when she started training judo under the influence of her younger brother. After a few years of practicing judo she decided to start Jiu Jitsu at the age of 21.

Not having competed much in the lower belts she came up as a surprise to the bjj community when she showed up as a brown belt winning the European Championship and the World Championship in 2016. She was awarded her black belt in December 2016; by then, given her success in competitions that year she was believed to have equal success next year in the black belt competitions.

Making her debut as a black belt in 2017 she won the European Championship, the Brazilian National Championship and the World Championship on the first try. That same year she was nominated for the Flograppling award of black belt female of the year.

Following her success of the previous year, she had an even more successful 2018; where she won the IBJJF grand Slam, which consists of the biggest tournaments of the year : European Championship, Pan Jiu-Jitsu Championship, Brazilian National Championship and the World Championship, which means she also won for the second consecutive year the Brazilian Jiu-Jitsu Federation Black Belt World, the most important title in the jiu jitsu world. She also finished the 2017/2018 season as the 2nd in the Ranking IBJJF in the Gi. Still that year, for the first time, she competed in the Master Worlds tournament, having only become eligible that year to compete in the masters' division (for people with 30 years or above). The tournament is held in Las Vegas and happens at the same time and venue as the IBJJF Las Vegas Open. Do Val competed in all the categories both her weight division and the Absolute and in two days won 6 gold medals. Soon after Las Vegas, do Val was in Tokyo where she competed at the Asian Open Championship and took two gold medals for her weight category and Open Class. She went back to Brazil in time to win the São Paulo Open tournament, and set again on another trip for more tournaments in Europe, where she participated in 5 tournaments, in a different country each, and brought with her 20 medals.

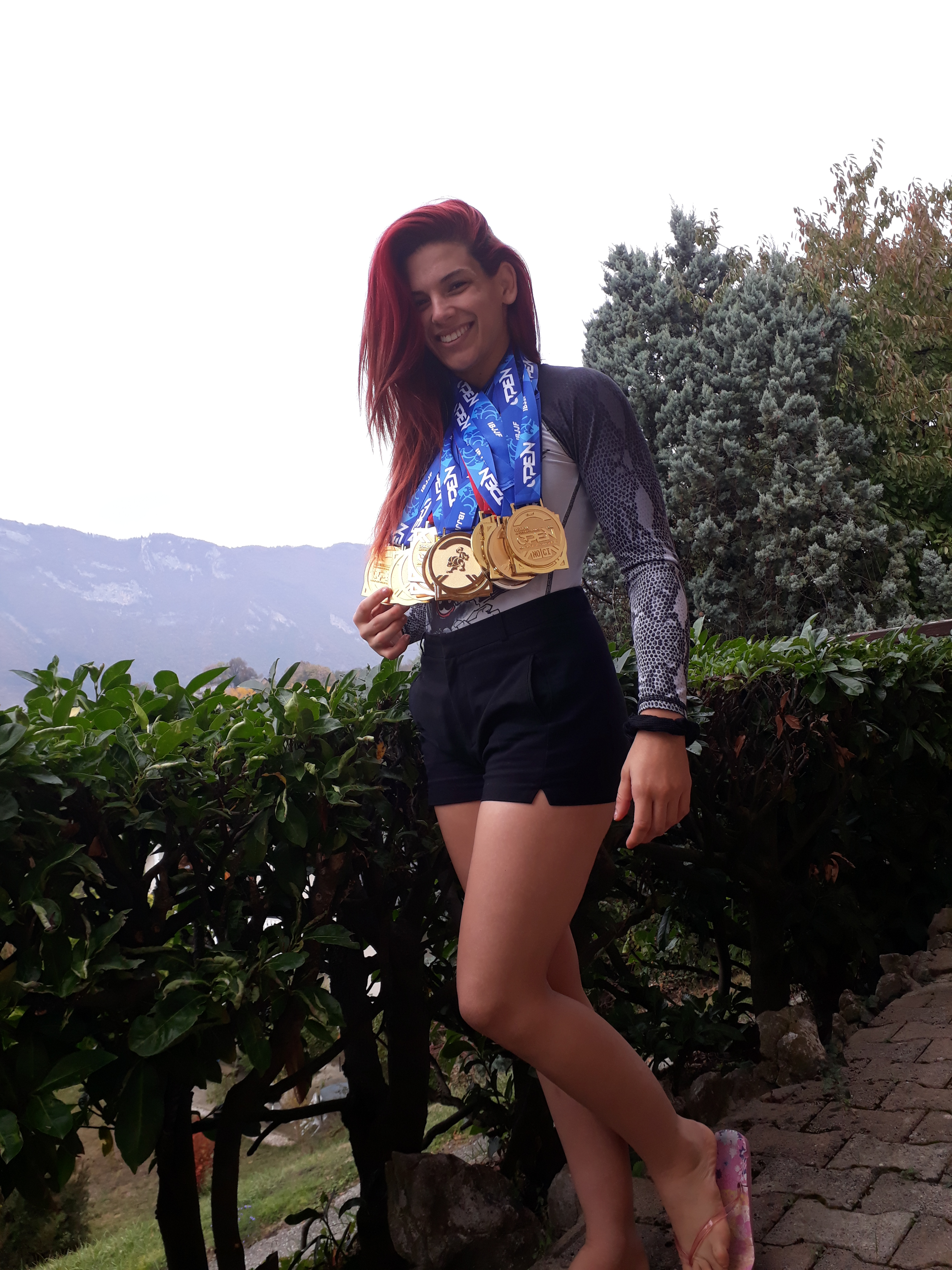
Claudia do Val's quest for gold in Europe 2018

By December, she reached the end of the IBJJF NoGi Season as the No.1 in the Ranking. Again by the end of the year she was nominated for the Floggrappling award of black belt female of the year.

Starting 2019 she set up a record winning a match at the Manila Open with 91 points on the scoreboard and submitting with a few seconds to go. She was invited for an interview with CNN Philippines for the program sports desk. She was also sought by the magazines Her World and Shape while in Singapore, for interviews. By June that year she won her third consecutive title at the Brazilian Jiu-Jitsu Federation Black Belt World, this time at the super heavy weight division, holding then 3 World Titles, each in a different weight category She also reached the end of the IBJJF competitive Gi season (2018/2019) as the first in the ranking She also won for the second time the Master World Championship in Las Vegas. Like the previous year, do Val set on another trip to Europe, only this is time she participated in 10 tournaments, each in a different country, bringing back home 35 medals, from 2 months work.

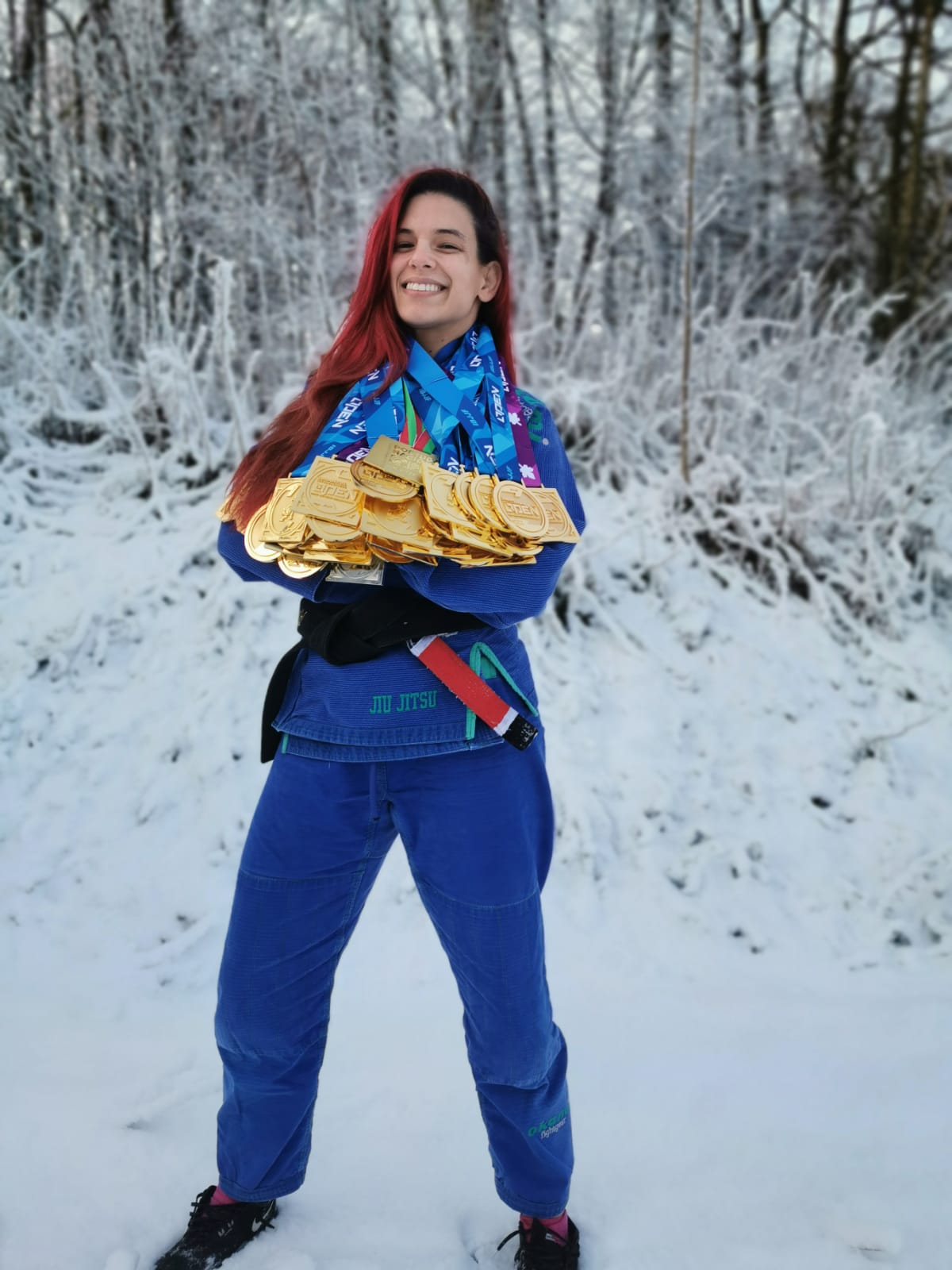
Claudia do Val's medals after 2 months in Europe

And for the second time she also finished No.1 in the ranking IBJJF NoGi season.

== Championships and accomplishments ==
- IBJJF World Championships:

2016 Brown Belt Heavy: (gold)
2017 Black Belt Heavy: (gold)
2018 Black Belt Medium Heavy: (gold)
2019 Black Belt Super Heavy: (gold)

- IBJJF Master World Championships:

2018 Black Belt Master1 Medium Heavy: (gold)
2018 Black Belt Master1 Open Class: (gold)
2019 Black Belt Master1 Medium Heavy: (gold)

- IBJJF Pan American Championships:

2017 Black Belt Medium : (silver)
2018 Black Belt Super Heavy: (gold)

- IBJJF Brazilian Nationals Championships:

2017 Black Belt Heavy: (gold)
2017 Black Belt Open Class: (bronze)
2018 Black Belt Heavy: (gold)
2018 Black Belt Open Class: (silver)
2019 Black Belt Heavy: (silver)

- IBJJF European Championships:

2016 Brown Belt Medium Heavy: (gold)
2016 Brown Belt Open Class: (bronze)
2017 Black Belt Heavy: (gold)
2017 Black Belt Open Class: (bronze)
2018 Black Belt Medium Heavy: (gold)
2018 Black Belt Open Class: (bronze)
2019 Black Belt Medium Heavy: (silver)
2019 Black Belt Open Class: (bronze)
2020 Black Belt Master1 Heavy: (gold)
2020 Black Belt Master1 Open Class: (silver)

- IBJJF Asian Open Championships:

2018 Black Belt Heavy: (gold)
2018 Black Belt Open Class: (gold)

- IBJJF Brazilian Nationals NoGi

2019 Black Belt Heavy: (gold)

- IBJJF NoGi Worlds Championships

2018 Black Belt Medium Heavy: (silver)

- IBJJF European NoGi Championships

2019 Black Belt Heavy: (gold)

- IBJJF South Brazilian Championships

2016 Brown Belt Open Class: (gold)

- IBJJF South American Championship

2016 Brown Belt Super Heavy: (gold)
2016 Brown Belt Open Class: (silver)

- IBJJF Rio Summer Open:

2016 Brown Belt Super Heavy: (gold)
2016 Brown Belt Open Weight: (gold)
2016 NoGi Brown Belt Open Class: (gold)

- IBJJF Rio Winter Open:

2016 Brown Belt SuperHeavy: (gold)
2016 Brown Belt Open Class: (gold)

- IBJJF Rio Fall Open

2019 Black Belt Open Class: (gold)

- IBJJF Curitiba fall Open

2017 Black Belt Open Class: (silver)
2017 NoGi Black Belt Open Class: (gold)

- IBJJF Curitiba winter open

2017 Black Belt Heavy: (gold)
2017 Black Belt Open Class: (gold)
2017 NoGi Black Belt Heavy: (gold)
2017 NoGi Black Belt Open Class: (gold)

- IBJJF Floripa Open

2017 Black Belt Medium: (gold)
2017 Black Belt Open Class: (bronze)
2018 Black Belt Open Class: (gold)
2018 NoGi Black Belt Open Class: (gold)
2019 Black Belt Open Class: (gold)
2019 NoGi Black Belt Super Heavy: (gold)
2019 NoGi Black Belt Open Class: (gold)

- IBJJF Belo Horizonte Open

2017 Black Belt Open Class: (bronze)
2017 NoGi Black Belt Open Class: (gold)

- IBJJF São Paulo Open

2018 Black Belt Medium Heavy: (gold)
2018 Black Belt Open Class: (gold)
2018 NoGi Black Belt Open Class: (gold)

- IBJJF Rio BJJ PRO

2016 Brown Belt Open Class: (silver)

- IBJJF São Paulo BJJ PRO

2016 Brown Belt Super Heavy: (gold)
2016 Brown Belt Open Class: (silver)
2017 Black Belt Open Class: (silver)

- IBJJF Curitiba BJJ PRO

2019 Black Belt Open Class: (gold)

- IBJJF Brasília Open

2017 Black Belt Open Class: (gold)

- IBJJF Salvador Open

2017 Black Belt Medium Heavy: (gold)
2017 Black Belt Open Class: (silver)
2018 Black Belt Open Class: (gold)
2018 NoGi Black Belt Open Class: (gold)
2019 Black Belt Open Class: (gold)

- IBJJF Vitoria Open

2017 NoGi Black Belt Open Class: (gold)

- IBJJF México Open

2018 Black Belt Heavy: (gold)
2018 Black Belt Open Class: (gold)

- IBJJF Manila Open

2019 Black Belt Super Heavy: (gold)
2019 Black Belt Open Class: (gold)

- IBJJF Tel Aviv Open

2019 Black Belt Open Class: (gold)
2019 NoGi Black Belt Open Class: (gold)

- IBJJF British Nationals

2017 Black Belt Open Class: (gold)
2018 Black Belt Open Class: (gold)
2018 NoGi Black Belt Open Class: (silver)

- IBJJF Spanish Nationals

2017 Black Belt Medium Heavy: (gold)
2017 Black Belt Open Class: (gold)
2017 NoGi Black Belt Open Class: (gold)
2018 Black Belt Open Class: (gold)

- IBJJF Madrid Open

2017 Black Belt Open Class: (gold)
2017 NoGi Black Belt Open Class: (silver)
2019 Black Belt Open Class: (gold)
2019 NoGi Black Belt Open Class: (gold)

- IBJJF Paris Open

2017 Black Belt Open Class: (gold)
2019 Black Belt Open Class: (silver)
2019 NoGi Black Belt Open Class: (gold)

- IBJJF Lisbon Open

2018 Black Belt Open Class: (gold)
2018 NoGi Black Belt Open Class: (gold)
2019 Black Belt Open Class: (gold)
2019 NoGi Black Belt Open Class: (gold)

- IBJJF London Fall Open

2018 Black Belt Open Class: (gold)
2019 Black Belt Open Class: (gold)
2019 NoGi Black Belt Open Class: (gold)

- IBJJF London Winter Open

2020 Black Belt Super Heavy: (gold)

- IBJJF Florence Open

2018 Black Belt Open Class: (gold)

- IBJJF Geneve Open

2018 Black Belt Open Class: (gold)

- IBJJF Amsterdam Open

2018 Black Belt Open Class: (gold)
2019 Black Belt Open Class: (bronze)

- IBJJF Rome fall open

2019 Black Belt Open Class: (gold)

- IBJJF Dublin open

2019 Black Belt Open Class: (gold)

- IBJJF Berlin Open

2019 Black Belt Super Heavy: (gold)

- IBJJF Munich Open

2020 Black Belt Super Heavy: (gold)
2019 NoGi Black Belt Super Heavy: (gold)

- IBJJF American Nationals

2019 Black Belt Heavy: (gold)
2019 Black Belt Open Class: (silver)
2019 NoGi Black Belt Open Class: (silver)

- IBJJF San Diego BJJ PRO

2017 Black Belt Open Class: (silver)

- IBJJF Long Beach Open

2017 Black Belt Open Class: (gold)

- IBJJF Las Vegas Summer Open

2018 Black Belt Medium Heavy: (gold)
2018 Black Belt Open Class: (gold)
2018 NoGi Black Belt Medium Heavy: (gold)
2018 NoGi Black Belt Open Class: (gold)
2019 Black Belt Heavy: (gold)
2019 NoGi Black Belt Heavy: (gold)

- IBJJF Nashville Open

2018 Black Belt Open Class: (gold)

- IBJJF New York Summer Open

2017 Black Belt Open Class: (gold)

- IBJJF New York Spring Open

2018 Black Belt Open Class: (gold)

- IBJJF New York BJJ PRO

2018 Black Belt Open Class: (gold)
2019 Black Belt Heavy: (silver)

- IBJJF Dallas Spring Open

2018 Black Belt Open Class: (gold)

- IBJJF Austin open

2019 Black Belt Super Heavy: (gold)

- IBJJF San Antonio Open

2018 Black Belt Heavy: (gold)

- IBJJF Boston Spring Open

2018 Black Belt Heavy: (gold)
2018 Black Belt Open Class: (silver)

- IBJJF Washington DC Spring Open

2018 Black Belt Open Class: (gold)
2018 NoGi Black Belt Open Class: (gold)

- IBJJF Orlando Open

2019 Black Belt Open Class: (gold)
2019 NoGi Black Belt Open Class: (gold)

- IBJJF Chicago Open

2018 Black Belt Open Class: (gold)
2018 NoGi Black Belt Open Class: (gold)

== Personal life ==
=== Education ===
Claudia do Val began her engineering studies in 2010 at CEFET/RJ, but abandoned before graduating when she decided she wanted to do jiu jitsu for a living

=== Health ===
Claudia do Val suffered bullying in her younger years which lead to a series of body issues problems and eating disorders including bulimia. She openly spoke about her disorder in 2014 on her Facebook page when she decided to confront the illness and start her recovery.

She suffered a shoulder injury in the beginning of 2016. She underwent surgery in 2018 and claims the injury was never really healed.

=== Sexual misconduct allegations ===
Claudia do Val made an allegation of sexual misconduct by her former Brazilian jiu-jitsu coach, Ricardo De La Riva, in an interview which aired on 3 April 2020 on Paola Diana's YouTube Channel.
