= Lana Stefanac =

Brazilian Jiu-Jitsu practitioner and mixed martial artist from the US

- Born: 16 June 1975 (age 51); Cleveland, Ohio, US
- Other names: Lethal
- Nationality: American
- Height: 5 ft 10 in (1.78 m)
- Weight: 185 lb (84 kg; 13.2 st)
- Division: Medium heavy Middleweight (MMA)
- Reach: 70.0 in (178 cm)
- Team: Relson Gracie; Open Dor Bjj; Gracie Elite trinity bjj
- Rank: BJJ black belt
- Years active: 2006–2009 (MMA)

Mixed martial arts record
- Total: 6
- Wins: 6
- By knockout: 1
- By submission: 4
- By decision: 1
- Losses: 0

Other information
- Website: http://lanastefanac.com/
- Mixed martial arts record from Sherdog

Lana Stefanac is an American mixed martial artist, grappler and black belt Brazilian jiu-jitsu practitioner and instructor. Stefanac is a World, Pan American, and US National Brazilian jiu-jitsu Champion in colored belts, she is a two-time black belt world champion (Note: As a brown belt competing in the combined brown and black female division) and the first American woman to become world champion in both her weight class and in the Open class.

== Career ==
Lana Stefanac was born on 16 June 1975 in Cleveland, Ohio, US, her father was born in Lika, Croatia before emigrating to the US. Stefanac started training in Muay Thai then after meeting 3rd degree black belt Donald Park, a student of Royler Gracie, she started Brazilian jiu-jitsu (BJJ) in 2003.

In 2006, after receiving her blue belt, she won the Pan Jiu-Jitsu Championship in her division, that same year Stefanac started competing MMA winning 3 matches that year, all won by submission. Her first match was against champion boxer Martha Salazarbe. Stefanac won again the Pan Ams in the purple belt division in 2007 in both Gi and No-Gi then won silver at the ADCC Submission Wrestling World Championships. Stefanac won three more MMA matches between 2006 and 2008, ending her MMA career with an impressive 6–0 professional record. In 2008 she had a record of 200 wins, 3 losses in both Gi and No Gi. (Note: According to the ADCC) In 2008, she won the ADCC North American Trials.

Stefanac was promoted to black belt in 2009 by Randy Bloom straight after winning double gold at the 2009 Brazilian jiu-jitsu world championship after defeating Kyra Gracie in her division and Gabi Garcia (16-0) in the Open class. Stefanac retired from MMA undefeated in 2009. In 2011 she won Bronze at the world championship in both her weight and in Open class, that same year she announced giving up competing to pursue her career in law enforcement.

== Championships and accomplishments ==
=== Brazilian jiu-jitsu ===
Main Achievements (Black belt):

- IBJJF World Champion (2009 (Note: black/brown division) (Note: Weight and Absolute))
- 3rd place IBJJF World Championship (2011)

Main Achievements (Colored belt):

- IBJJF Pan American No-Gi Champion (2007 (Note: blue/purple division)))
- IBJJF Pan American Champion (2006 Blue / 2007 Purple)

=== Grappling ===
- ADCC West Coast Trials winner (2008)
- 2nd Place ADCC Submission Wrestling World Championship (2007)

=== Mixed martial arts ===
- 3 Professional MMA Title Belts in 2 weight divisions

== Mixed martial arts record ==
Professional record breakdown
6 matches	6 wins	0 losses
By knockout	0	0
By submission	4	0
By decision	2	0

Res.	Record	Opponent	Method	Event	Date	Round	Time	Location	Notes
Win	6–0	Teyvia Reid	Technical Submission (Armbar)	FFF 4 – Call of the Wild	April 3, 2008	1	0:36	Los Angeles, United States	
Win	5–0	Megumi Yabushita	Decision (Unanimous)	Smackgirl 7th anniversary: Starting Over	December 1, 2007	2	5:00	Tokyo, Japan	
Win	4–0	Franita Gathings	Decision (Unanimous)	AOW – Art of War 3	September 1, 2007	1	1:07	Dallas, United States	
Win	3–0	Teyvia Reid	Technical Submission (Armbar)	FCFS 4 – Damage Control	November 19, 2006	1	5:00	Indiana, United States	
Win	2–0	Stacy Piper Ford	Submission (Armbar)	FCFS 3 – Full Contact Fight Series	September 16, 2006	1	0:29	Indiana, United States	
Win	1–0	Martha Salazar	Submission (Guillotine Choke)	Extreme Wars 3 – Bay Area Brawl	June 3, 2006	1	2:09	Oakland, United States	

== Private life ==
Stefanac's brother Mark is a police officer, a BJJ black belt and the owner of the Relson Gracie Jiu-Jitsu Academy in Willoughby, Ohio.
