= Celso Vinicius =

Brazilian martial artist

Celso Venicius
- Born: December 27, 1983 (age 42); Rio de Janeiro, Rio de Janeiro, Brazil
- Other names: Celsinho
- Weight: 155 lb (70 kg; 11 st 1 lb)
- Division: Lightweight
- Fighting out of: São Paulo, Brazil
- Team: Ryan Gracie BJJ
- Rank: black belt in Brazilian Jiu-Jitsu

Mixed martial arts record
- Total: 6
- Wins: 5
- By knockout: 0
- By submission: 3
- By decision: 2
- Losses: 1
- By knockout: 0
- By decision: 1

Other information
- Mixed martial arts record from Sherdog

Celso Vinicius
Medal record

World Championship
Gold medal – first place	2008 California, USA	-76 kg
Bronze medal – third place	2007 California, USA	-76 kg
Gold medal – first place	2006 Rio de Janeiro, Brazil	-76 kg
Gold medal – first place	2005 Rio de Janeiro, Brazil	-76 kg

Pan American Championship
Gold medal – first place	2008 California, USA	-76 kg

Celso "Celsinho" Venicius (born December 27, 1983) is a Brazilian jiu-jitsu black belt competitor and mixed martial artist. He is a three-time IBJJF World Champion and one of the leading lightweights of his generation.

== Early life ==
Vinicius was born in São Paulo, Brazil. He began training martial arts as a child and transitioned to Brazilian Jiu-Jitsu as a teenager. He was promoted to black belt under Ryan Gracie, becoming one of the top representatives of the team in the early 2000s.

== Brazilian Jiu-Jitsu career ==
As a colored belt, Vinicius won several titles in the Brazilian national circuit, establishing himself as one of the most technical competitors in his weight class. At black belt, he reached the highest level of the sport by becoming a three-time IBJJF World Champion.

Vinicius competed extensively in international events such as the IBJJF Pan Championship, European Championship, and the World Jiu-Jitsu No-Gi Championship, adding to his reputation as a versatile competitor.

== Mixed martial arts career ==
Vinicius made his professional MMA debut in Brazil in the mid-2000s, competing for organizations such as Shooto Brazil and regional promotions. He fought in the lightweight division and showcased his grappling skills in the cage.

== Titles ==
- 3x World Champion (2008, 2006, 2005)
- Pan American Champion (2008)
- South American Champion (2009 – Middleweight Division)
- Ultimate Absolute NYC|Ultimate Absolute NYC 2 Champion (2011)
- World Pro Cup Silver Medalist (2011)
- World Bronze Medalist (2007)

== Mixed martial arts record ==
Professional record breakdown
6 matches	5 wins	1 loss
By knockout	0	0
By submission	3	0
By decision	2	1

Res.	Record	Opponent	Method	Event	Date	Round	Time	Location	Notes
Loss	5-1	(Brazil) Jorge Patino	Decision (Unanimous)	Thunder Fight 4 - Macaco vs. Celsinho	June 20, 2015	5	5:00	São Paulo, Brazil	
Win	5-0	(Brazil) Rodrigo Gomes	Decision (Unanimous)	Talent MMA Circuit 10	August 9, 2014	5	5:00	Osasco, Brazil	
Win	4-0	(Brazil) Andre Luis Sousa	Submission (North-South Choke)	Talent MMA Circuit 7	March 29, 2014	1	4:45	Osasco, Brazil	
Win	3-0	(Brazil) Henrique Morgan	Submission (armbar)	Moema Fight	October 6, 2012	1	3:50	São Paulo, Brazil	
Win	2-0	(Brazil) Emerson Peixoto	Decision (unanimous)	Max Fight 13	May 12, 2012	3	5:00	São Paulo, Brazil	
Win	1-0	(Brazil) Adriano Millioni	Submission (punches)	Face To Face 5	December 18, 2010	1	1:32	Rio de Janeiro, Brazil	

== See also ==
- List of Brazilian Jiu-Jitsu practitioners
- Samuel Braga
- Fábio Leopoldo
