= Otávio Sousa =

Jiu-Jitsu fighter

Otavio Sousa
- Born: Recife, Pernambuco, Brazil
- Nationality: Brazilian
- Team: Gracie Barra

Otávio Sousa
Medal record

Representing Brazil

Grappling

ADCC Submission Wrestling World Championship
Silver medal – second place	2013 Beijing, China	-77 kg

Brazilian Jiu-Jitsu

World Jiu-Jitsu Championship
Gold medal – first place	2012 California, USA	-82 kg
Gold medal – first place	2013 California, USA	-82 kg
Silver medal – second place	2014 California, USA	-82 kg
Gold medal – first place	2016 California, USA	-82 kg

Pan-American Championship
Gold medal – first place	2020 California, USA	-82 kg
Gold medal – first place	2017 California, USA	-82 kg
Gold medal – first place	2010 California, USA	-82 kg
Gold medal – first place	2009 California, USA	-82 kg
Silver medal – second place	2019 California, USA	-82 kg
Silver medal – second place	2009 California, USA	Absolute
Silver medal – second place	2008 California, USA	-82 kg
Bronze medal – third place	2016 California, USA	-82 kg
Bronze medal – third place	2011 California, USA	-82 kg

European Open Championship
Silver medal – second place	2008 Europe	Middleweight (brown belt)
Silver medal – second place	2007 Europe	Middleweight (brown belt)

Brazilian Nationals (CBJJ)
Silver medal – second place	2004 Brazil	Middleweight (purple belt)

Otavio Sousa (born in Recife, Brazil) is a Brazilian Jiu Jitsu competitor. He is a black belt and competes for Gracie Barra, where he has won numerous championships. Souza is a three time black belt Brazilian jiu-jitsu world champion and ADCC silver medalist.

== Early life ==
Sousa was born in Recife, Brazil. He began training in martial arts during childhood and transitioned to Brazilian Jiu-Jitsu in his teenage years. Demonstrating early talent, he competed actively in local tournaments before moving to Rio de Janeiro to pursue a professional career in the sport.

== Brazilian Jiu-Jitsu career ==
Sousa was awarded his black belt by Carlos Gracie Jr. in 2009 and quickly became one of the most successful competitors of his generation. He is known for his aggressive guard passing style and technical precision.

Over the course of his career, Sousa won the IBJJF World Championship three times in the middleweight division (2012, 2013, 2015). He also medaled multiple times at the Pan-American Championship, European Championship, and Brazilian Nationals, earning recognition as one of the top competitors to represent Gracie Barra internationally.

== ADCC career ==
Sousa competed at the 2015 ADCC Submission Fighting World Championship, where he advanced to the finals of the 77 kg division, ultimately winning a silver medal after facing Davi Ramos.

== Teaching ==
Outside of competition, Sousa has been involved in teaching Brazilian Jiu-Jitsu through the Gracie Barra network. He has taught in academies in Brazil, the United States, and Europe, contributing to the spread of the team’s methodology.

== Achievements ==
Brazilian Jiu-Jitsu

- IBJJF World Champion (2012, 2013, 2015)
- IBJJF Pan-American Champion
- IBJJF European Open Champion
- CBJJ Brazilian Nationals medalist

ADCC

- Silver medal – 2015 ADCC World Championship (77 kg)

== Legacy ==
Otávio Sousa is recognized as one of the most successful middleweight competitors of his era. Beyond his competitive career, he is also respected as an instructor within the Gracie Barra association, helping to train young athletes

== See also ==
- List of Brazilian jiu-jitsu practitioners
- Gracie Barra
