= Panorama, São Paulo =

Panorama
- Municipality
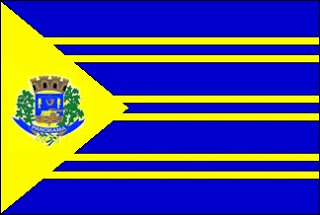
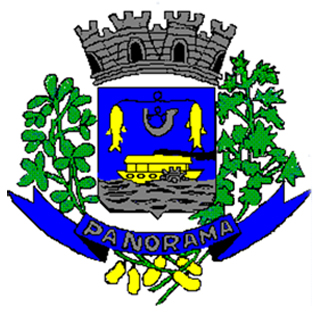
- Flag Coat of arms

- Location in São Paulo state

- Location in Brazil
- Coordinates: 21°21′23″S 51°51′36″W
- Country: Brazil
- Region: Southeast
- State: São Paulo

Area
  - Total: 356 km^{2} (137 sq mi)

Population (2020)
  - Total: 15,862
  - Density: 44.6/km^{2} (115/sq mi)
- Time zone: UTC−3 (BRT)

Panorama is a municipality in the state of São Paulo in Brazil. The population is 15,862 (2020 est.) in an area of 356 km^{2}. The elevation is 276 m.

== Media ==
In telecommunications, the city was served by Telecomunicações de São Paulo. In July 1998, this company was acquired by Telefónica, which adopted the Vivo brand in 2012. The company is currently an operator of cell phones, fixed lines, internet (fiber optics/4G) and television (satellite and cable).

== Religion ==
The Catholic church in the municipality is part of the Roman Catholic Diocese of Marília.

Christian evangelical beliefs are present in the city, mainly Pentecostal, including the Assemblies of God in Brazil (the largest evangelical church in the country), Christian Congregation in Brazil, among others.

== People from Panorama ==
- Erich Munis

== See also ==
- List of municipalities in São Paulo
