= 2009 World Jiu-Jitsu Championship =

Brazilian Jiu-Jitsu competitions

- Venue: California State University
- Location: (United States) Long Beach, California
- Dates: June 4–7 2009
- Website: IBJJF

The 2009 World Jiu-Jitsu Championship, commonly known as the 2009 Mundials or 2009 Worlds, was an international jiu-jitsu event organised by the International Brazilian Jiu-Jitsu Federation (IBJFF) and held at California State University in Long Beach, California, United States, on June 4–7, 2009.

== Teams results ==
Results by Academy

Rank	Men's division	
Rank	Team	Points
1	Alliance	n/a
2	Gracie Barra	n/a
3	Checkmat	n/a

Rank	Women's division	
Rank	Team	Points
1	Gracie Humaita	n/a
2	Renzo Gracie	n/a
3	Gracie Barra	n/a
