= Hilton Leão =

1946 jiu-jitsu practitioner from Brazil (born 1953)

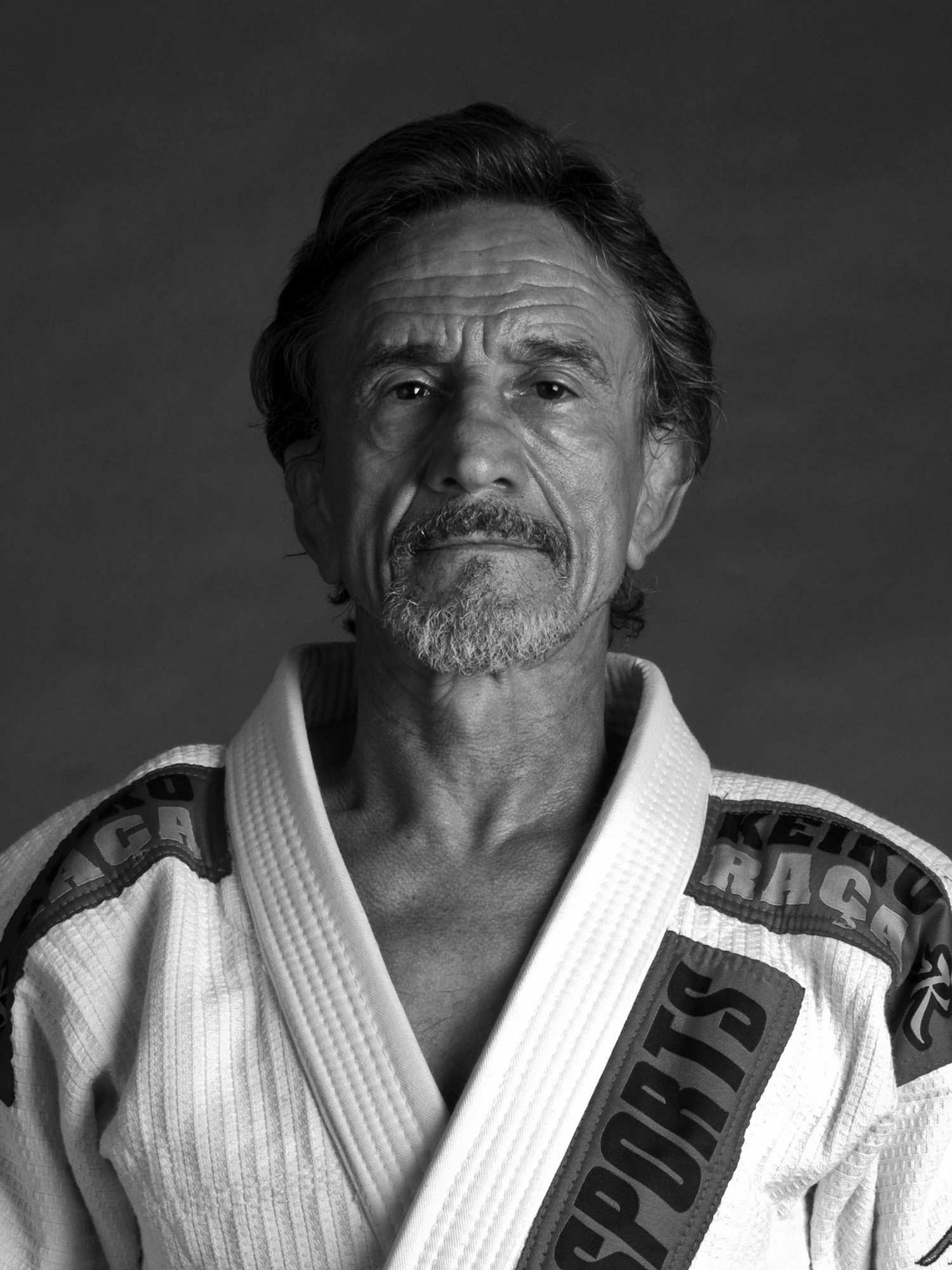
- Hilton Leão, 2010
- Born: Hilton Leão da Silva; April 11, 1946 (age 80); Bonfim, Minas Gerais, Brazil
- Style: Brazilian Jiu-Jitsu
- Rank: 9th deg. BJJ red belt

Hilton Leão da Silva (born April 11, 1946) is an 9th Degree Red Belt in Brazilian jiu-jitsu. He is a 6 times winner of International IBJJF Master championships (1999, 2000, 2003, 2004, 2005, 2006).

== Biography ==
He is the actual president of Liga Brasileira de Jiu-Jitsu and also the head of Leão Dourado Brazilian jiu-jitsu Association in Belo Horizonte, Brazil. Having originally achieved his black belt in Brazilian jiu-jitsu in 1975.

In 2008 he received his 8th Degree in jiu-jitsu by the hands of the president of Federação Mineira de Jiu-Jitsu, Adair Alves de Almeida.

Master Hilton Leão is still an avid practitioner of the art. In 2008, at 62 years old, he fought Célio Caneca on the International Masters & Seniors of Jiu-Jitsu.

Leão Dourado means golden lion in Portuguese.

== Titles ==
- 6 times winner of International Master & Sênior of Jiu-Jitsu for IBJJF (1999, 2000, 2003, 2004, 2005, 2006)
