= Ana Laura Cordeiro =

Brazilian jiu-jitsu practitioner from Brazil

- Born: Ana Laura Gonçalves Cordeiro; July 11
- Division: Middleweight
- Team: Gracie Barra
- Trainer: Master Carlos Gracie Jr.
- Rank: 4rd Deg. BJJ black belt (Note: under Carlos Gracie Jr.)

Other information
- Occupation: BJJ instructor

Ana Laura Cordeiro is a Brazilian submission grappler, 3rd-degree black belt Brazilian jiu-jitsu (BJJ) practitioner and coach.

A multiple-time IBJJF World (Gi and No-Gi) and IBJJF Pan champion in the lower belts divisions, Cordeiro is a three-time black belt World champion, two-time No-Gi World champion, two-time Pan Champion and ADCC Submission Fighting World Champion. Famously undefeated at one time with a record of 65–0, Cordeiro has been described as: "one of the greatest female grapplers to have graced the sport", and "one of the most accomplished women in Jiu-Jitsu history".

== Career ==
Ana Laura Gonçalves Cordeiro was raised in Minas Gerais, Brazil. She started training Brazilian jiu-jitsu (BJJ) at the age of 17. To compete she started training at the Gracie Barra academy in Brasília, under the supervision of Carlos Gracie Jr., a 3-hour bus journey from her home. After receiving her blue belt she became World champion in 2006, promoted to purple belt the following year she won double gold at the World Championship, winning her weight division and the openweight category. A year later, competing as a brown belt, she won the World Championship title for the fourth time, also winning double gold at the 2008 IBJJF World No-Gi Championship in the combined female brown/black belt division.

Cordeiro moved to the US in 2009 receiving her black belt from Gracie Barra founder, Carlos Gracie Jr. While a serious back injury unexpectedly interrupted her competitive career for 5 years, she is still regarded as "one of the greatest female grapplers to have graced the sport". In 2014 she returned to competition winning gold at the Las Vegas International Championship, then winning the following year the ADCC Submission Fighting World Championship the most prestigious tournament in submission grappling. She now has her own Gracie Barra Brazilian Jiu-Jitsu gym in Upland, California.

== Brazilian Jiu-Jitsu competitive summary ==
Main Achievements:

- IBJJF World Champion (2006 blue, 2007 purple, (Note: weight and absolute) 2008 combined brown/black division, 2014 2015)
- IBJJF World No-Gi Champion (2008 combined brown/black division)
- IBJJF Pan American Champion (2009 combined brown/black division, 2008 combined brown/black division)
- IBJJF Las Vegas International Champion (2014)

== Instructor lineage ==
Mitsuyo Maeda > Carlos Gracie Sr. > Helio Gracie > Carlos Gracie Junior > Ana Laura Cordeiro
