= Erich Munis =

Brazilian jiu-jitsu athlete

- Born: December 19, 1997 (age 28); Panorama, São Paulo, Brazil
- Nationality: Brazil
- Weight: Heavyweight / Super Heavyweight
- Style: Brazilian Jiu-Jitsu
- Team: Soldiers Jiu Jitsu
- Rank: Black belt in Brazilian Jiu-Jitsu under Dream Art Project

Erich Munis (born December 19, 1997, in Panorama, São Paulo, Brazil) is a Brazilian Jiu-Jitsu practitioner and black belt under the Dream Art Project team. Widely regarded as one of the top heavyweight competitors of his generation, Munis is a multiple-time IBJJF World Champion in the black belt division and has secured titles at the Pan-American Championship as well as prominent national and international tournaments.

== Biography ==
Erich Munis was born on December 19, 1997, in Panorama, a small town in the contrysite of São Paulo, Brazil. From an early age, he was influenced by his father, who encouraged Erich and his brothers, Anderson and Alex, to pursue sports and martial arts despite the limited availability of training options in their hometown.

In 2013, Brazilian Jiu-Jitsu was introduced to Panorama through the Raça team, where Erich began training alongside his brother Anderson. Meanwhile, Alex, the oldest, trained in Três Lagoas at an academy affiliated with Nova União and Clube Feijão. During this period, the three brothers started to gain recognition, driven by their ambition to pursue competitive careers in jiu-jitsu.

As blue belts, the Munis brothers decided to commit to the sport professionally. With Alex already connected to Clube Feijão in Maringá, the trio secured scholarships to train under coach Rodrigo Feijão. They gained prominence during their purple belt campaigns, despite facing financial challenges in competing at high-level tournaments.

A turning point in Erich's career came when he joined the Dream Art Project, founded by Isaque Bahiense, which provided comprehensive support for elite athletes. Representing Dream Art, Erich achieved significant international titles, including a double gold at the World Championship as a purple belt. His success culminated in his promotion to black belt on September 28, 2020, alongside his brothers, in a ceremony led by Isaque Bahiense and Gabriel Figueiró. In 2023, Erich announced his departure from Dream Art to pursue new directions in his career.

== Career ==
=== Colored Belts ===
As a colored belt, Munis amassed notable titles in national and international IBJJF tournaments.

=== Black Belt ===
Promoted to black belt by the Dream Art Project, Erich quickly rose to prominence on the international stage. His major achievements include multiple IBJJF World Championship titles, solidifying his status as one of the premier heavyweights of his era.

=== Major Achievements ===
- 1st Place – IBJJF World Championship (2021 / 2022 / 2023 / 2024 / 2025)
- 1st Place – IBJJF Pan-American Championship (2022 / 2023)
- 1st Place – IBJJF European Championship (2024)
- 1st Place – CBJJ Brazilian National Championship (2021 / 2025)
- 1st Place – IBJJF The Crown GP (2024)
- 1st Place – AJP Abu Dhabi World Pro (2021)
- 1st Place – AJP Grand Slam, Rio de Janeiro (2021)
- 3rd Place – AJP Grand Slam, Abu Dhabi (2021)

== Fighting Style ==
Munis is recognized for his technical and strategic approach, emphasizing a versatile open guard and positional control. His guard game is characterized by precise sweeps and transitions to submissions, while his passing pressure is applied methodically and effectively. At events like the IBJJF The Crown 2024, he showcased a repertoire that included submissions, sweeps, passing pressure, and back takes, demonstrating his ability to deploy multiple tools against elite opponents. Independent analyses highlight his consistent pace, strategic posture, and physical dominance, qualities that enable him to control opponents at the highest competitive level.

== See also ==
- Sarah Galvão
- João Miyao
- Diego Pato
- Anderson Munis
