= Carlos Lemos (fighter) =

Brazilian jiu-jitsu practitioner (born 1978)

Carlos Lemos, Jr.
- Born: 9 April 1978 (age 48); Rio de Janeiro, Brazil
- Other names: Escorrega (slippery )
- Nationality: Brazilian-American
- Division: Pluma/Feather
- Style: Brazilian Jiu-Jitsu, Judo
- Fighting out of: Downers Grove, USA
- Team: Gracie Barra
- Trainer: Carlos Gracie Jr. Alexandre Soca Carneiro; Roberto "Gordo" Correa; Redley Vigio; Renzo Gracie
- Rank: 5th deg. BJJ black belt

Other information
- Occupation: Brazilian jiu-jitsu instructor
- Website: http://www.carloslemosjr.com/

Carlos Lemos Jr. commonly known as Escorrega (born 9 April 1978 in Rio de Janeiro, Brazil) is a former mixed martial artist and 5th degree Brazilian jiu-jitsu (BJJ) black belt practitioner and coach.

A multiple-time world champion in the sport, Lemos Jr. is also regarded as one of the first black belts to come over to Europe to coach and establish jiu jitsu academies. Lemos Jr is the regional director of Gracie Barra in the Chicago area.

== Biography ==
=== Early life ===
Carlos Lemos Jr. was born on 9 April 1978 in Rio de Janeiro, Brazil. He started taekwondo at the age of three, progressing to judo at ten. He began training Brazilian jiu-jitsu at the age of 14.

=== Recent competitive achievements ===
Since his last documented world title in 2018, Carlos Lemos Jr., known as "Escorrega," has continued to leave a mark on the Brazilian jiu-jitsu (BJJ) competitive scene. As a 5th-degree black belt under Master Carlos Gracie Jr., he has remained active in the masters divisions of major tournaments. In recent years, Lemos has competed in the International Brazilian Jiu-Jitsu Federation (IBJJF) events, including the Chicago International Open, where he secured medals in both his weight class and the absolute division, showcasing his skill and adaptability. His competitive spirit remains a testament to his lifelong dedication to the sport, even as he balances his roles as a coach and academy leader.

=== Growth of Gracie Barra in Chicago ===
Lemos has significantly expanded the presence of Gracie Barra in the Chicago area since establishing himself there in 2008. As the regional director of Gracie Barra in the Midwest, he oversees multiple academies, with Gracie Barra Downers Grove serving as his flagship location. Under his leadership, the academy has grown into a hub for BJJ practitioners of all levels, producing numerous black belts and competitive champions. His emphasis on fostering a family-like community and upholding the Gracie Barra philosophy of "Jiu-Jitsu for Everyone" has attracted a diverse student base, from beginners to professional fighters. In recent years, Lemos has also introduced specialized programs, such as self-defense workshops and youth development initiatives, further solidifying his influence in the region.

=== Coaching and mentorship ===
Beyond his competitive career, Carlos Lemos Jr. has become a respected coach and mentor in the global BJJ community. He has trained and promoted black belts who lead Gracie Barra academies worldwide, including Niclas Gustafsson and Salvatore Pace in Europe, and Hector Vargas and Pedro Tello in the United States. Lemos has also conducted seminars across the U.S. and internationally through initiatives like the GB Ambassadors Program, sharing his expertise as a four-time world champion.

=== Media and educational contributions ===
In recent years, Lemos has expanded his efforts to educate the BJJ community through digital platforms. He has contributed to instructional content, including online classes and technique breakdowns, often in collaboration with Gracie Barra’s global network. These efforts have made his knowledge accessible to a broader audience, reinforcing his role as an ambassador of the sport. Additionally, Lemos has been featured in interviews and podcasts, where he discusses his journey, the evolution of BJJ, and the importance of resilience—themes that resonate with his experiences during the global pandemic and beyond.

=== Personal life and legacy ===
Now in his mid-40s, Carlos Lemos Jr. remains connected to his roots in Rio de Janeiro while embracing his life in the United States. His multilingual abilities (fluent in Portuguese, English, and other languages) have aided his mission to spread BJJ globally. As a father and family man, he often speaks about the parallels between raising a family and building a jiu-jitsu community, emphasizing discipline, respect, and mutual support. He says his legacy is not only in his titles but in the countless students he has inspired to pursue excellence both on and off the mats.

=== Mixed martial arts update ===
Although Lemos stepped away from professional MMA after his two victories in 2011, he has remained involved in the sport as a coach. He has worked with MMA fighters in the Chicago area, helping them refine their grappling skills for the cage. While he has not returned to competition himself, his brief but successful MMA career continues to be a point of interest for fans, highlighting his versatility as a martial artist.

=== Achievements ===
From blue belt he started training under Carlos Gracie Jr earning all his belts from him. He became a World Champion for the first time at the 1999 World Jiu-Jitsu Championship as a purple belt. In 2011 he briefly competed in MMA, winning both of his two fights.

Lemos Jr. won another world championship, this time in Masters in 2015 and again in 2018, earning him his fourth world title. He is currently the head instructor of Gracie Barra Downers Grove in Downers Grove, Illinois.

== Brazilian jiu-jitsu competitive summary ==
Main achievements (black belt level):

- IBJJF World Champion (2002)
- IBJJF American No-Gi Champion (2009)
- IBJJF European Champion (2004)
- Brazilian Teams Champion (2003)
- IBJJF Pan American Master Champion (2015)
- IBJJF Chicago Open Master Champion (2010 Open Weight)
- IBJJF Chicago Summer Open No-Gi Champion (2014)
- IBJJF Chicago Summer Open Champion (2014)
- IBJJF Chicago Winter Open No-Gi Champion (2013 absolute)
- 2nd place IBJJF World Championship (2003)
- 2nd place IBJJF Chicago Open Championship (2012)
- 2nd place IBJJF Chicago Winter Open No-Gi Championship (2013)
- 2nd place IBJJF American No-Gi Championship (2009 Open weight)
- 3rd place IBJJF World Championship (2005)

Main achievements (colored belts):

- IBJJF World Champion (1999 purple)
- IBJJF Pan American Champion (2000 brown)
- 3 X Brazilian National Champion (1996, 1998, 1999)
- 3rd place IBJJF World Championship (2000 brown)

== Instructor lineage ==
Mitsuyo Maeda > Carlos Gracie Sr. > Carlos Gracie Junior > Carlos Lemos Jr

== Mixed martial arts record ==
Professional record breakdown
2 matches	2 wins	0 losses
By knockout	0	0
By submission	1	0
By decision	1	0

Res.	Record	Opponent	Method	Event	Date	Round	Time	Location	Notes
Win	1–0	Jason Rine	Submission (Rear-Naked Choke)	TFC	15 January 2011	1	1:59		
Win	2–0	Mike Phillips	Decision (Unanimous)	TFC	23 July 2011	3	5:00		
