= 2010 World Jiu-Jitsu Championship =

Brazilian Jiu-Jitsu competitions

- Venue: California State University
- Location: (United States) Long Beach, California
- Dates: 3–6 June 2010
- Website: IBJJF

The 2010 World Jiu-Jitsu Championship, commonly known as the 2010 Mundials or 2010 Worlds, was an international jiu-jitsu event organised by the International Brazilian Jiu-Jitsu Federation (IBJFF) and held at California State University in Long Beach, California, United States, on 3–6 June 2010.

== Teams results ==
Results by Academy

| Rank | Men's division | |
| Rank | Team | Points |
|---|---|---|
| 1 | Alliance | n/a |
| 2 | Gracie Barra | n/a |
| 3 | Checkmat | n/a |

| Rank | Women's division | |
| Rank | Team | Points |
|---|---|---|
| 1 | Alliance | n/a |
| 2 | Gracie Humaita | n/a |
| 3 | Lloyd Irvin | n/a |
