= Andressa Cintra =

Brazilian jiu-jitsu practitioner from Brazil (born 1995)

- Born: 4 August 1995 (age 31); Campo Mourão, Brazil
- Other names: Andressa Mezari Cintra
- Division: Middleweight − 69 kg
- Fighting out of: Texas, USA
- Team: Gracie Barra; Checkmat
- Rank: 1st deg. BJJ black belt (Note: UnderSebastian Lalli)

Other information
- Occupation: BJJ instructor

Andressa Cintra (born 4 August 1995) is a Brazilian jiu-jitsu 1st deg. black belt athlete. A three-time IBJJF World and four-time CBJJ Brazilian Nationals Champion in colored belts, Cintra is a four-time black belt World Champion, Pan American and Brasileiro Champion. Cintra was ranked No. 1 in the middleweight 2022–2023 IBJJF Gi Ranking.

== Early life ==
Andressa Cintra was born 4 August 1995, in Campo Mourão, Brazil, before her family resettled in Curitiba. She started Brazilian jiu-jitsu at 14 under Joao Guedes and Rodrigo Feijao. In 2013 as a blue belt she won the Brazilian Nationals while attending a Physical Education college. Training under various coaches including Caio Almeida, the co-founder of the Almeida Jiu Jitsu academy and Luiz Guilherme from who she received her purple belt training with Guigo Jiu Jitsu team in São Paulo, she finally joined Checkmat after returning to in Curitiba training under black belt Sebastian Lalli.

Cintra received her brown belt from Lalli and in December 2017 her black belt at the podium after her World Championship win, In 2018 she moved to Houston, Texas; married Lucas Valente of Gracie Barra; and joined the team, teaching and training under both Valente and 6th Degree Black Belt Vinicius "Draculino" Magalhães.

=== Black belt career ===
In 2019 Cintra won her fist IBJJF World Championship as a black belt. Three years after receiving her black belt she received her 1st degree from Draculino in 2020. Cintra competed in the 2023 World Jiu-Jitsu Championship on June 3 and 4, 2023 winning her fourth consecutive Worlds title at middleweight.

She then competed at the IBJJF No-Gi World Championship 2023, where she won the heavyweight division.

Cintra won a gold medal in the middleweight division of the IBJJF World Championship 2024 on June 1, 2024.

== Championships and accomplishments ==
Main Achievements (at black belt):

- IBJJF World Champion (2019 / 2021 / 2022 / 2023)
- IBJJF Pan Champion (2020)
- CBJJ Brazilian Nationals Champion (2022)
- IBJJF Pan Champion (2021)

Main Achievements (at colored Belts):

- IBJJF World Champion (2017 (Note: Weight and absolute) brown, 2016 purple)
- CBJJ Brazilian Nationals Champion (2017 brown, 2016 (Note: Absolute) purple, 2014/2013 blue)
- IBJJF South American Champion (2017 brown)
- 2nd place IBJJF World Championship (2016 purple)
- 2nd place IBJJF Pans Championship (2017 brown)
- 2nd place CBJJ Brazilian Nationals (2016 purple)
- 2nd place IBJJF South American Championship (2016/2015 purple)
- 3rd place CBJJ Brasileiro Championship (2017 brown, 2014 blue)
- 3rd place IBJJF South American Championship (2016/2015 purple)

== Instructor lineage ==
Carlos Gracie, Sr. > Carlson Gracie > De La Riva > Carlos Lima > Sebastian Lalli > Andressa Cintra
