= Leticia Ribeiro =

Brazilian martial artist

- Born: Leticia Ribeiro N. Dos Santos; February 24, 1979 (age 46); Rio de Janeiro, Brazil
- Style: Brazilian jiu-jitsu
- Team: Gracie Humaitá
- Teachers: Royler Gracie, Vinicius Aieta, Marcelo Machado
- Rank: 6th degree black belt in BJJ

Other information
- Occupation: Brazilian jiu-jitsu instructor

Leticia Ribeiro N. Dos Santos (born February 24, 1979) is a 6th degree Brazilian jiu-jitsu black belt and multiple time world champion in the sport. She is associated with the Gracie Humaita jiu-jitsu school. Ribeiro is considered one of the top 10 best Brazilian jiu-jitsu female fighters of all time, even having been distinguished with membership to the IBJJF Hall of Fame.

== Biography ==
Leticia Ribeiro began training in Brazilian jiu-jitsu in 1995 at the Gracie Tijuca Academy originally under Marcelo Machado a student of Royler Gracie and the Gracie Humaita school. She initially began training for esthetic reasons but quickly fell in love with the art and began training more seriously. At the time the Gracie Tijuca Academy had the reigning national women's championship team in Brazil.

She has won numerous jiu-jitsu national and world championships during the course of her career. Originally starting with the Gracie Tijuca Academy. Ribeiro began training under her original instructor Royler Gracie eventually earning her black belt under Gracie. In addition to Gracie, Leticia also trained with Vinicius Aieta, Saulo Ribeiro, Xande Ribeiro and other black belts from the Gracie Humaita team.

Ribeiro competed in the first women's divisions at the ADCC World Championships on May 27 and 28, 2005. She defeated Gazzy Parman in the opening round before losing to Alessandra 'Leka' Vieira in the semi-final of the under 60kg division.

Ribeiro is currently a 6th degree black belt in Brazilian jiu-jitsu under Royler Gracie and represents the Gracie Humaita team in jiu-jitsu competitions. She's presently head instructor at Gracie Humaita South Bay Competition Team in San Diego, California, teaching Gi and No-Gi Brazilian jiu-jitsu classes, head coach of the Gracie Humaita Female Team and trainer of the World Champion Beatriz Mesquita.

Between Mesquita and Ribeiro, the Gracie South Bay school is associated with 2 distinguished world champions of the sport, both members of the IBJJF Hall of Fame. As of December 2024, there are only 6 other female members besides them.

== Personal life ==
Ribeiro resides in San Diego, California and is bilingual in English and Portuguese. Her long term partner is MMA fighter Fabrício Camões.

== Media appearances ==
In the fourth episode of season 3 of Wildboyz reality TV series, Steve-O and Chris Pontius visit Brazil and attend the Gracie Humaita jiu-jitsu school in Rio de Janeiro. Royler Gracie takes on Chris Pontius and chokes him out, while Leticia defeats Steve-O via armbar submission.

== Titles ==
- 2014 World Brazilian jiu-jitsu Championships – Women's Black Belt Light Featherweight 3rd Place
- 2012 World Brazilian jiu-jitsu Championships – Women's Black Belt Light Featherweight 1st Place
- 2011 World Brazilian jiu-jitsu Championships – Women's Black Belt Light Featherweight 1st Place
- 2011 European Brazilian jiu-jitsu Championships – Women's Black Belt Featherweight 3rd Place
- 2010 World Brazilian jiu-jitsu No-Gi Championships – Women's Black Belt Super Featherweight 1st Place
- 2010 World Brazilian jiu-jitsu Championships – Women's Black Belt Light Featherweight 1st Place
- 2009 World Brazilian jiu-jitsu Championships – Women's Black Belt Light Featherweight 1st Place
- 2009 World Brazilian jiu-jitsu No-Gi Championships – Women's Black Belt Super Featherweight 2nd Place
- 2008 World Brazilian jiu-jitsu Championships – Women's Black Belt Featherweight 3rd Place
- 2008 World Brazilian jiu-jitsu No-Gi Championships – Women's Black Belt Super Featherweight 1st Place
- 2007 World Brazilian jiu-jitsu Championships – Women's Black Belt Featherweight 3rd Place
- 2006 World Cup Brazilian jiu-jitsu Championships – Women's Black Belt Featherweight 1st Place
- 2006 World Brazilian jiu-jitsu Championships – Women's Black Belt Featherweight 1st Place
- 2005 World Brazilian jiu-jitsu Championships – Women's Black Belt Featherweight 2nd Place
- 2005 Rio de Janeiro State Jiu-Jitsu Championships – Women's Black Belt Featherweight 1st Place
- 2005 Pan American Jiu-Jitsu Championships – Women's Black Belt Feather 1st Place
- 2005 European Brazilian jiu-jitsu Championships – Women's Black Belt Featherweight 1st Place
- Challenge 2 – Brazil x Japan – Superfight Champion
- 2005 World Cup Brazilian jiu-jitsu Championships – Women's Black Belt Featherweight 1st Place
- 2004 Rio de Janeiro State Jiu-Jitsu Championships – Women's Black Belt Featherweight 1st Place
- 2004 Pan American Jiu-Jitsu Championships – Women's Black Belt Feather 1st Place
- 2003 World Brazilian jiu-jitsu Championships – Women's Black Belt Featherweight 3rd Place
- 2003 World Cup Brazilian jiu-jitsu Championships – Women's Black Belt Featherweight 1st Place
- 2003 Pan American Jiu-Jitsu Championships – Women's Black Belt Featherweight 1st Place
- 2003 Brazilian National Cup Jiu-Jitsu Championships – Women's Black Belt Featherweight 1st Place
- 2003 Third Black Belt Challenge – Superfight Champion
- 2002 World Brazilian jiu-jitsu Championships – Women's Black Belt Featherweight 1st Place
- 2002 Brazilian National Jiu-Jitsu Championships – Women's Black Belt Featherweight 2nd Place
- 2001 World Brazilian jiu-jitsu Championships – Women's Black Belt Featherweight 2nd Place
- 2000 World Brazilian jiu-jitsu Championships – Women's Black Belt Featherweight 1st Place
- 2000 Brazilian National Jiu-Jitsu Championships – Women's Brown Belt Featherweight 1st Place
- 2000 Rio de Janeiro State Jiu-Jitsu Championships – Women's Brown Belt Featherweight 1st Place
- 1999 World Brazilian jiu-jitsu Championships – Women's Brown Belt Featherweight 3rd Place
- 1999 Brazilian National Jiu-Jitsu Championships – Women's Brown Belt Featherweight 1st Place
- 1999 Rio de Janeiro State Jiu-Jitsu Championships – Women's Brown Belt Featherweight 1st Place
- 1998 Brazilian National Jiu-Jitsu Championships – Women's Purple Belt Featherweight 1st Place
- 1998 Rio de Janeiro State Jiu-Jitsu Championships – Women's Purple Belt Featherweight 1st Place
- 1997 Brazilian National Jiu-Jitsu Championships – Women's Purple Belt Featherweight 2nd Place
- 1997 Rio de Janeiro State Jiu-Jitsu Championships – Women's Purple Belt Featherweight 1st Place
- 1996 Rio de Janeiro State Jiu-Jitsu Championships – Women's Blue Belt Featherweight 1st Place
- 1996 Brazilian National Jiu-Jitsu Championships – Women's Blue Belt Featherweight 1st Place
