= World Master Jiu-Jitsu Championship =

Annual Brazilian jiu-jitsu tournament for master age divisions organized by the IBJJF

The World Master Jiu-Jitsu Championship is one of the International Brazilian Jiu-Jitsu Federation's (IBJJF) most prestigious tournaments, bringing together veteran athletes for high-level competitions. Created to provide a suitable competitive environment for more experienced fighters, the event has become a landmark in the Brazilian Jiu-Jitsu calendar.

== History ==
The World Masters Championship was introduced in 2012 by the IBJJF to offer a high-performance competition for athletes over the age of 30. Since then, it has been held annually in the United States, attracting fighters worldwide.

== Categories ==
The tournament's categories are divided by age group and degree level, ensuring that competitors face opponents of similar age and experience.

=== Age categories ===
- Master 1 - 30 to 35 years old
- Master 2 - 36 to 40 years old
- Master 3 - 41 to 45 years old
- Master 4 - 46 to 50 years old
- Master 5 - 51 to 55 years old
- Master 6 - 56 to 60 years old
- Master 7 - 61 and over

=== Graduation categories ===
- Blue belt
- Purple belt
- Brown belt
- Black belt

== 2025 edition ==
The 2025 edition is scheduled to take place between August 28 and 30 at the Westgate Las Vegas Resort & Casino in Las Vegas, Nevada, United States.

== IBJJF Grand Prix ==
The IBJJF Grand Prix is a parallel tournament to the World Masters, bringing together elite athletes in bouts that offer cash prizes. The first edition took place in 2016, during UFC Fight Week in Las Vegas. The event resumed in 2024 after a five-year hiatus.

== Recent winners ==
- 2024 - Return of the No-Gi Grand Prix with a bracket of 8 competitors competing for $40,000 in prizes.
- 2023 - Nicholas Meregali won the absolute GP.
- 2022 - Felipe Pena won the absolute division.
- 2021 - Victor Hugo won the absolute division.
- 2020 - Event not held due to the COVID-19 pandemic.
- 2019 - Leandro Lo won the absolute division.

== See also ==
- World Jiu-Jitsu Championships
- Brazilian jiu-jitsu ranking system
- Master international jiu-jitsu championship
