= Leandro Lo =

Brazilian jiu-jitsu athlete (1989–2022)

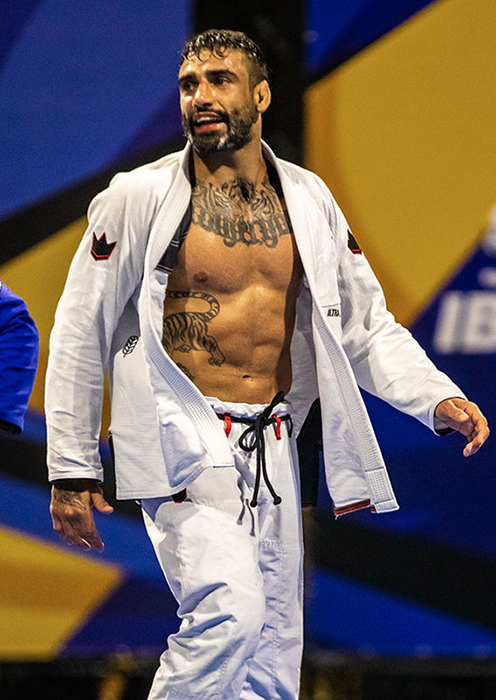
- Leandro Lo at the 2022 IBJJF Worlds
- Born: Leandro Lo Pereira do Nascimento; 11 May 1989; São Paulo, Brazil
- Died: 7 August 2022 (aged 33); São Paulo, Brazil
- Division: GI weight classes: Lightweight: −76 kg (168 lb); Middleweight: −82.3 kg (181 lb); Middle-Heavy: −88.3 kg (195 lb); Heavyweight: −94.3 kg (208 lb); Super-Heavy: −100.5 kg (222 lb); No-GI weight classes: Lightweight: −73.5 kg (162 lb)
- Team: Unity Jiu Jitsu; NS Brotherhood; Barbosa JJ; PSLPB Cicero Costha
- Teacher: Cicero Costha
- Rank: BJJ black belt (under Cicero Costha)

Other information
- Website: leandrolo.com

Leandro Pereira do Nascimento Lo (11 May 1989 – 7 August 2022), better known as Leandro Lo, was a Brazilian jiu-jitsu black belt competitor. A record holder with eight IBJJF world championship titles in five different weight classes, (Note: Lightweight (2012, 2013), middleweight (2014), medium-heavy (2015, 2016), heavyweight (2019) and open weight (2018).) as well as multiple wins at every major international tournament, Lo is considered one of the most accomplished jiu-jitsu competitors of all time.

Born in São Paulo, Lo began training Brazilian jiu-jitsu (BJJ) at fourteen, after joining a social jiu-jitsu training program for underprivileged children. In 2005 he won his first world championship, competing as a blue belt. In 2010 his coach Cicero Costha promoted him to black belt. During the 2011–12 season Lo won medals at two no-gi championships, and his first black belt IBJJF world, Pan Am and UAEJJF World Pro titles. In 2015, he established his own jiu-jitsu team, NS Brotherhood.

In 2016 Lo became the first Copa Pódio triple crown champion, winning three different weight divisions within the same year; three years later in 2019, he made history after winning the World Championships in five different weight classes. In June 2022 Lo won an eighth world championship, exactly ten years after his first title as black belt. Lo was shot and killed in August 2022 at the age of 33. On May 11, 2023 the IBJJF announced that they would be posthumously inducting Lo into the IBJJF Hall of Fame.

== Early life ==
Leandro Pereira do Nascimento Lo was born on 11 May 1989 on the east side of São Paulo, Brazil. He started practising Brazilian jiu-jitsu (BJJ) at the age of 14, after joining a program for low-income children and adolescents, set up by Jiu-Jitsu instructor and coach Cicero Costha, called Projecto Social Lutando Pelo Bem or PSLPB (Social Project Fighting for Good ).

As a blue belt, Lo won his first IBJJF world championship in 2005, competing as a lightweight under team Barbosa JJ, winning silver the following year, and bronze at the 2006 Brazilian National Championship competing as a featherweight. As a purple belt, Lo won silver at the 2006 World Championship but suffered a serious injury that kept him from most tournaments, using that time to heal and refine his technique, Lo then won silver at the 2008 CBJJE Brazilian Cup. Lo received all his belts from Costha's hands, and in July 2010, was promoted to black belt.

== Black belt career ==
=== 2011–14: Brazilian champion, Copa Podio winning streak, first UAEJJF and IBJJF titles ===
Fighting at lightweight (under 76 kg (168 lb)), Lo won the 2011 CBJJ Rio International Open, coming third in Absolute, and won the Brazilian Nationals. That same year Lo won the 2011 Abu Dhabi World Pro defeating Michael Langhi, who at the time was unbeaten in the lightweight division for three consecutive years, and Celso Vinicius one of the best jiu-jitsu lightweight competitor at the time. Competing in No-Gi Lo became two-time Brazilian National No-Gi champion after winning gold for two consecutive years in three divisions; in 2012 Lo won silver in Absolute at the 2012 IBJJF World No-Gi Championship, losing the final to Xande Ribeiro via advantage.

In 2012 he won another Brazilian Nationals title, the Pan American championship. and that same year, Lo won his first black belt world title becoming the 2012 lightweight world champion after beating Lucas Lepri in the final. Lo won again the 2013 World lightweight division the following year. Lo held an unbeaten winning streak at the Copa Podio Grand Prix from 2011 to 2013, one of the biggest professional jiu-jitsu events in Brazil, winning the 2013 edition in Rio de Janeiro after submitting UFC welterweight Gilbert Burns in an epic 20 minutes match. Until then a two-time lightweight world champion and already considered the best lightweight in the world, Lo won double gold (both weight and absolute) at the 2013 CBJJ Rio International Open, competing as middleweight alongside his partner at the time, Luiza Monteiro who also won double gold.

Lo entered the 2014 World Championship moving up a weight class to middleweight (under 82.3 kg (181 lb)). After defeating Otavio Sousa Lo became the 2014 middleweight world champion, also winning Pan Am and Abu Dhabi Pro that year.

=== 2015–17: Copa Podio triple crown, IBJJF double grand slam ===
In 2015, Lo left PSLPB to form his own team NS Brotherhood (Jiu-Jitsu New School Brotherhood) taking with him several fellow competitors. That same year Lo defeated Lucas Lepri in Rio de Janeiro for the GP lightweight title, becoming Copa Podio champion for the fourth time. Going up a weight class again to medium heavyweight (under 88.3 kg (195 lb)), Lo won the 2015 World (his fourth title in a row), the Pan Am and the Abu Dhabi Pro tournaments.

In October 2016, Lo made history by becoming the first ever Copa Podio triple crown champion: winning three consecutive Grand Prix titles in three separate weight classes: Lightweight, Middleweight and Heavyweight, all in the same year; a performance never before accomplished in the sport of jiu-jitsu. Lo won the last heavyweight title without conceding a single point. In addition to the three Copa Podio Grand Prix, Lo won the IBJJF World and Pan championships as well as the UAEJJF World Pro that year.

In 2017 Lo went again up another weight class by entering the IBJJF tournaments at heavyweight (under 94.3 kg (208 lb)), that year he won silver in absolute and silver in heavyweight at the world championship, after losing to Nicholas Meregali in the final. Lo then won double gold at Pan after defeating ultra heavyweight João Gabriel Rocha in the open weight final. Lo also won double gold at the Brazilian Nationals and double gold at the European Championship, where he competed for the first time, after submitting Tanner Rice in the heavyweight final and Claudio Calasans by points (4-0) in the open weight final.

During the ADCC North American West Coast Trials, held in Anaheim California on 15 April 2017, Lo defeated Gordon Ryan in a Superfight by 4×0 pts. Invited to the 2017 ADCC World Championships in Espoo, Finland, competing for the first time for the -88 kilograms (194 lb) title, Lo was eliminated in the first round by Asia and Oceania Trials winner Craig Jones. After achieving a double Grand Slam, gold medals in weight and absolute divisions in the four main IBJJF tournaments: Euros, Pans, Brazilian Nationals and Worlds, Lo placed #1 in the IBJJF 2016–2017 ranking,

=== 2018–20: Eighth Pan Am and record IBJJF World titles ===
Lo became two-time Absolute Pan Champion, after winning the heavyweight and absolute divisions at the 2018 tournament taking place in March in Irvine, California. Lo defeated Tanner Rice in the heavyweight finals and Gutemberg Pereira in the finals of the Absolute division, furthering his record to eight Pan titles. (Note: Lo earned eight gold medals in five different weight classes: one at lightweight, two at middleweight, one at medium-heavyweight, two at heavyweight, and two in open weight.)

In May 2018 Lo entered the world championship as super-heavyweight (under 100.5 kg (222 lb)) but dislocated his shoulder twice during the super-heavyweight final and was unable to continue; in a surprising move, his close friend Marcus Buchecha, who he was supposed to face in the Absolute final, forfeited his match to give Lo the 2018 open weight title, the only title missing in his career. In November Lo announced that he was stepping down from his role as NS Brotherhood head coach, to focus on competition and on his career.

Lo went back to heavyweight at the 2019 World Championship, winning silver after losing to Kaynan Duarte in the final. Competing for the open weight title, Lo defeated Keenan Cornelius in the semi-final but made the final a close out (Note: Close-outs are when two competitors meet in the finals of a tournament and instead of competing against each other mutually decide not to face one another.) when he gave Buchecha the victory, returning the previous year favour. However, after Kaynan Duarte was stripped of his victory for failing a USADA Test, Lo was crowned world heavyweight champion, making him a record world champion in 5 different weight classes, thus dethroning the record held for 20 years by Saulo Ribeiro. On September 6, 2020, Lo competed against Nicholas Meregali at BJJ Bet, fighting him to a draw. He was then invited to compete in the middleweight grand prix at BJJ Stars 4 on November 14, 2020. Lo defeated three opponents on points and managed to win the tournament.

=== 2021–22: Eighth and last IBJJF World title ===
Returning at medium-heavyweight for the first time since 2016, training at Unity Jiu Jitsu in New York, Lo won bronze at the 2021 World Championship and at the 2022 Pan Jiu-Jitsu Championship; he then became the 2022 World Jiu-Jitsu Champion after defeating Isaque Bahiense in the medium heavyweight final; winning his eighth and last world championship title, an accomplishment only reached at the time by three others in IBJJF history. That last title placed him at number 1 in the medium-heavy male gi division for the 2021–2022 season of the International Brazilian Jiu-Jitsu Federation Ranking.

Lo was booked to compete against Alex Munis in the main event of BJJ Stars 5 on February 6, 2021. Lo submitted Munis with a collar choke to win the match. He then competed in the main event of Big Deal Pro 3 on July 11, 2021 against Henrique Ceconi and defeated him by advantages. Lo was then invited to compete in the no gi grand prix at BJJ Bet 2 on August 1, 2021. Lo won his first two matches against Rafael Paganini and William Tackett but was submitted by Lucas 'Hulk' Barbosa by rear-naked choke in the final.

== Recognition ==
His guard technique earned Lo recognition as one of the "best pound for pound grapplers to have ever graced the mat." According to top coach John Danaher, Lo was "unquestionably one of the greatest Jiu-jitsu athletes of his generation and indeed in the history of the sport". The International Brazilian Jiu-Jitsu Federation called Lo "one of the greatest athletes our sport has ever produced" and "an example of a true black belt, martial artist and champion on and off the mats".

On May 11, 2023 the IBJJF announced that they would be posthumously inducting Lo into the IBJJF Hall of Fame.

On October 1, 2024, Belo Horizonte announced the introduction of the ‘Leandro Lo - Jiu-jitsu in Schools’ program, using Lo as inspiration for bringing the sport to schoolchildren.

== Brazilian jiu-jitsu competitive summary ==
=== Main achievements as black belt ===
Achievements at major competitions:

- 8 × IBJJF World Champion (2012 / 2013 / 2014 / 2015 / 2016 / 2018 (Note: Absolute) / 2019 / 2022)
- 8 × IBJJF Pans Champion(2012 / 2014 / 2015 / 2016 / 2017 (Note: Weight and Absolute) / 2018)
- 5 × UAEJJF Abu Dhabi Pro Champion (2011 / 2013 / 2014 / 2015 / 2016)
- IBJJF European Open Champion (2017)
- BJJ Stars Middleweight Grand Prix Champion (2020)
- 4 × CBJJ Brazilian Nationals Champion (2011 / 2012 / 2017)
- 3 × CBJJ Brazilian Nationals No-Gi Champion (2011 / 2012)
- 4 × Copa Podio Lightweight Grand Prix Champion (2011 / 2013 / 2014 / 2016)
- 2 × Copa Podio Middleweight Grand Prix Champion (2012 / 2016)
- Copa Podio Heavyweight Grand Prix Champion (2016)
- CBJJ Rio International Open Champion (2011 / 2013)
- 2nd place Copa Podio Heavyweight GP (2014)
- 2nd place IBJJF World Championship (2017 / 2018 / 2019)
- 2nd place IBJJF World No-Gi Championship (2012)
- 2nd place IBJJF Pans Championship (2016 / 2014)
- 3rd place IBJJF World Championship (2015 / 2021)
- 3rd place IBJJF World No-Gi Championship (2012)
- 3rd place CBJJ Rio International Open Champion (2011)

=== Main achievements in coloured belts ===
Achievements at major competitions:

- IBJJF World Champion (2005 junior blue)
- 2 × CBJJ Brazilian National Champion (2009 / 2010 brown)
- CBJJE Brazilian Cup Champion (2008 purple)
- 2nd place IBJJF World Championship (2006 junior blue)
- 2nd place CBJJ Brazilian Nationals (2008 purple)
- 3rd place CBJJE Brazilian Cup Champion (2006 blue)

== Instructor lineage ==
Carlos Gracie > Helio Gracie > Rickson Gracie > Marcelo Behring > Waldomiro Perez > Roberto Godoi > Marco Barbosa > Cicero Costha > Leandro Lo

== Fight history ==
Result	Opponent	Method	Event	Year	Weight
Win	Isaque Bahiense	Pts: 2x0	2022 World Jiu-Jitsu Championship	2022	88 kg
Win	Bruno Lima	Pts: 2x0	2022 World Jiu-Jitsu Championship	2022	88 kg
Win	Andre Porfirio	Pts: 4x0	2022 World Jiu-Jitsu Championship	2022	88 kg
Win	Rafael Anjos	Brabo choke	2022 World Jiu-Jitsu Championship	2022	88 kg
Loss	Micael Galvâo	Pts: 0x0, Adv	BJJ Stars	2022	83 kg
Win	Jansen Gomes	Pts: 5x0 2022	Pan Jiu-Jitsu Championship	2022	88 kg
Win	Bruno Tosto	Choke from back	Pan Jiu-Jitsu Championship	2022	88 kg
Loss	Gustavo Batista	Referee Decision	IBJJF World Jiu-Jitsu Championship	2021	88 kg
Win	Otavio Sousa	Pts: 2x0	IBJJF World Jiu-Jitsu Championship	2021	88 kg
Win	Nathan Mendelsohn	Pts: 2x0	IBJJF World Jiu-Jitsu Championship	2021	88 kg
Loss	Lucas Barbosa	RNC	BJJ Bet	2021	88 kg
Win	William Tackett	Injury	BJJ Bet	2021	88 kg
Win	Rafael Paganini	Pts: 10x0	BJJ Bet	2021	88 kg
Win	Henrique Cardoso	Pts: 0x0, Adv	Big Deal Pro 3	2021	94 kg
Win	Alex Munis	Cross choke	BJJ Stars 5	2021	88 kg
Loss	Lucas Barbosa	Pts: 2x0	BJJ Stars	2020	N/A
D	Nicholas Meregali	---	BJJ Bet	2020	Absolute
Win	Jaime Canuto	Pts: 0x0, Adv	BJJ Stars 4	2020	86 kg
Win	Claudio Calasans	Pts: 7x0	BJJ Stars 4	2020	86 kg
Win	Isaque Bahiense	Adv	BJJ Stars 4	2020	86 kg
Loss	Nicholas Meregali	Pts: 4x0	BJJ Stars	2019	100 kg
Win	Vinicius Trator	Referee Decision	Pan Jiu-Jitsu Championship	2019	94 kg
Loss	Adam Wardzinski	Choke from back	Pan Jiu-Jitsu Championship	2019	94 kg
Win	Devhonte Johnson	Pts: 2x0	Pan Jiu-Jitsu Championship	2019	Absolute
Win	Rudson Mateus	Referee Decision	Pan Jiu-Jitsu Championship	2019	Absolute
Win	Gustavo Batista	Pts: 2x0	Pan Jiu-Jitsu Championship	2019	Absolute
Loss	Lucas Barbosa	Referee Decision	Pan Jiu-Jitsu Championship	2019	Absolute
Win	Dominique Bell	Pts: 17x0	IBJJF World Jiu-Jitsu Championship	2019	94 kg
Win	Jackson Sousa	Pts: 2x0	IBJJF World Jiu-Jitsu Championship	2019	94 kg
Win	Vinicius Trator	DQ	IBJJF World Jiu-Jitsu Championship	2019	94 kg
Loss	Kaynan Duarte	Pts: 5x3	IBJJF World Jiu-Jitsu Championship	2019	94 kg
Win	Gustavo Dias	Pts: 5x0	IBJJF World Jiu-Jitsu Championship	2019	Absolute
Win	Luiz Panza	Triangle armbar	IBJJF World Jiu-Jitsu Championship	2019	Absolute
Win	Keenan Cornelius	Referee Decision	IBJJF World Jiu-Jitsu Championship	2019	Absolute
Win	Dimitrius Souza	Pts: 0x0, Adv	BJJ Stars	2019	Absolute
Loss	Gustavo Batista	Pts: 0x0, Adv	BJJ Stars	2019	Absolute
Loss	Kaynan Duarte	Pts: 0x0, Adv	Spyder Invitational	2019	100 kg
Win	Otavio Sousa	Points	ACB 10	2018	85 kg
Win	John Combs	Pts: 6x0	Pan Jiu-Jitsu Championship	2018	Absolute
Win	Keenan Cornelius	Pts: 7x2	Pan Jiu-Jitsu Championship	2018	Absolute
Win	Gutemberg Pereira	Pts: 2x0	Pan Jiu-Jitsu Championship	2018	Absolute
Win	Matheus Godoy	Cross choke	Pan Jiu-Jitsu Championship	2018	94 kg
Win	Fellipe Andrew	Pts: 3x0	Pan Jiu-Jitsu Championship	2018	94 kg
Win	Tanner Rice	Pts: 2x0	Pan Jiu-Jitsu Championship	2018	94 kg
Win	Gabriel Arges	Points	ACBJJ 13	2018	85 kg
Win	Rodrigo Ribeiro	Pts: 2x2, Adv	IBJJF World Jiu-Jitsu Championship	2018	100 kg
Win	Nelton Pontes	Pts: 2x0	IBJJF World Jiu-Jitsu Championship	2018	100 kg
Loss	Mahamed Aly	Injury	IBJJF World Jiu-Jitsu Championship	2018	100 kg
Win	Nick Schrock	DQ	IBJJF World Jiu-Jitsu Championship	2018	Absolute
Win	Luiz Panza	Pts: 2x0	IBJJF World Jiu-Jitsu Championship	2018	Absolute
Win	Victor Honorio	Pts: 4x0	IBJJF World Jiu-Jitsu Championship	2018	Absolute
Win	Andreas Perales	Cross choke	European Open	2017	Absolute
Win	Thomas Johannessen	Pts: 7x0	European Open	2017	Absolute
Win	Isaque Bahiense	Pts: 11x2	European Open	2017	Absolute
Win	Mahamed Aly	Pts: 3x0	European Open	2017	Absolute
Win	Claudio Calasans	Pts: 4x0	European Open	2017	Absolute
Win	Tony Ferraz	Pts: 24x0	European Open	2017	94 kg
Win	Karim Khalifa	Pts: 6x2	European Open	2017	94 kg
Win	Jesse Urholin	Pts: 0x0, Adv	European Open	2017	94 kg
Win	Tanner Rice	Armbar	European Open	2017	94 kg
Loss	Tarsis Humphreys	Referee Decision	FIVE Super League	2017	92 kg
Win	Lucas Rocha	Brabo choke	Pan Jiu-Jitsu Championship	2017	Absolute
Win	Dany Gerard	Pts: 2x0	Pan Jiu-Jitsu Championship	2017	Absolute
Win	Nicholas Meregali	Pts: 3x0	Pan Jiu-Jitsu Championship	2017	Absolute
Win	Joao Rocha	Toe hold	Pan Jiu-Jitsu Championship	2017	Absolute
Win	Jared Revel	Pts: 10x0	Pan Jiu-Jitsu Championship	2017	94 kg
Win	Nicholas Meregali	Pts: 2x0	Pan Jiu-Jitsu Championship	2017	94 kg
Win	Matheus Diniz	Pts: 2x0	Pan Jiu-Jitsu Championship	2017	94 kg
Win	Tanner Rice	Pts: 2x0	Pan Jiu-Jitsu Championship	2017	94 kg
Win	Gordon Ryan	Pts: 4x0	ADCC North American Trials	2017	Absolute
Win	Moises Junior	Choke from back	Brasileiro	2017	Absolute
Win	Rodrigo Ribeiro	Pts: 5x0	Brasileiro	2017	Absolute
Win	Otavio Nalati	Pts: 6x0	Brasileiro	2017	Absolute
Win	Renato Cardoso	Pts: 7x2	Brasileiro	2017	Absolute
Win	Erberth Santos	Pts: 6x4	Brasileiro	2017	Absolute
Win	Andre Rudolfo	Choke from back	Brasileiro	2017	100 kg
Win	Diego Lima	Points	Brasileiro	2017	100 kg
Win	Fernando Reis	Pts: 2x0	Brasileiro	2017	100 kg
Win	Erberth Santos	Pts: 5x0	Brasileiro	2017	100 kg
Win	Romeu Patrick	Brabo choke	Salvador Spring O.	2017	100 kg
Win	Talison Costa	N/A	Salvador Spring O.	2017	Absolute
Win	Dimitrius Souza	Bow and arrow	Salvador Spring O.	2017	Absolute
Win	Marcos Goulart	Bow and arrow	Curitiba Fall Open	2017	94 kg
Win	Italo Santos	Choke from back	Curitiba Fall Open	2017	Absolute
Win	Adriano Sousa	Brabo choke	Curitiba Fall Open	2017	Absolute
Win	Marcos Goulart	Pts: 12x0	Curitiba Fall Open	2017	Absolute
Win	Erberth Santos	Pts: 2x0	Curitiba Fall Open	2017	Absolute
Win	Dany Gerard	Pts: 2x0	IBJJF World Jiu-Jitsu Championship	2017	Absolute
Win	Joao Rocha	Pts: 2x0	IBJJF World Jiu-Jitsu Championship	2017	Absolute
Win	Luiz Panza	Pts: 3x2	IBJJF World Jiu-Jitsu Championship	2017	Absolute
Loss	Marcus Almeida	Pts: 2x2, Adv	IBJJF World Jiu-Jitsu Championship	2017	Absolute
Win	Tex Johnson	Brabo choke	IBJJF World Jiu-Jitsu Championship	2017	94 kg
Win	Matheus Diniz	Referee Decision	IBJJF World Jiu-Jitsu Championship	2017	94 kg
Win	Guilherme Augusto	Pts: 8x0	IBJJF World Jiu-Jitsu Championship	2017	94 kg
Loss	Nicholas Meregali	Pts: 2x0	IBJJF World Jiu-Jitsu Championship	2017	94 kg
Win	Ricardo Evangelista	Kimura	IBJJF Pro GP	2017	Absolute
Win	André Galvão	Pts: 0x0, Adv	IBJJF Pro GP	2017	Absolute
Loss	Marcus Almeida	Pts: 0x0, Adv	IBJJF Pro GP	2017	Absolute
Loss	Craig Jones	RNC	ADCC	2017	88 kg
Win	Davi Ramos	Pts: 6x2	Copa Podio	2016	77 kg
Win	AJ Sousa	Pts: 13x0	Copa Podio	2016	77 kg
Win	Lucas Lepri	Pts: 2x2, Adv	Copa Podio	2016	77 kg
Win	Felipe Cesar	Pts: 7x0	Copa Podio	2016	77 kg
Win	Dillon Danis	Pts: 2x0	Copa Podio	2016	77 kg
Win	Lucas Lepri	Pts: 2x0	Copa Podio	2016	77 kg
Win	Alessandro Silva	Bow and arrow	Pan Jiu-Jitsu Championship	2016	88 kg
Win	Gabriel Arges	Pts: 12x6	Pan Jiu-Jitsu Championship	2016	88 kg
Win	Renato Cardoso	Toe hold	Pan Jiu-Jitsu Championship	2016	88 kg
Win	Romulo Barral	Pts: 2x0	Pan Jiu-Jitsu Championship	2016	88 kg
Win	Dany Gerard	Cross choke	Pan Jiu-Jitsu Championship	2016	Absolute
Win	Guilherme Augusto	Pts: 3x0	Pan Jiu-Jitsu Championship	2016	Absolute
Win	André Galvão	Pts: 2x0	Pan Jiu-Jitsu Championship	2016	Absolute
Loss	Bernardo Faria	Arm in Ezekiel	Pan Jiu-Jitsu Championship	2016	Absolute
Win	Karol Dzieniszewski	Armbar	World Pro	2016	Absolute
Loss	Victor Honorio	Pts: 0x0, Adv	World Pro	2016	Absolute
Win	Lucas Rego	Choke	World Pro	2016	85 kg
Win	Patrick Gaudio	Pts: 4x2	World Pro	2016	85 kg
Win	Renato Cardoso	Pts: 2x0	World Pro	2016	85 kg
Win	Claudio Calasans	Referee Decision	World Pro	2016	85 kg
Win	Charles Negromonte	Pts: 8x0	IBJJF World Jiu-Jitsu Championship	2016	88 kg
Win	Matheus Diniz	Pts: 7x0	IBJJF World Jiu-Jitsu Championship	2016	88 kg
Win	Keenan Cornelius	Pts: 4x2	IBJJF World Jiu-Jitsu Championship	2016	88 kg
Win	Romulo Barral	Pts: 5x0	IBJJF World Jiu-Jitsu Championship	2016	88 kg
Win	Ricardo Rezende	Pts: 11x0	IBJJF World Jiu-Jitsu Championship	2016	Absolute
Win	Gustavo Dias	Pts: 7x0	IBJJF World Jiu-Jitsu Championship	2016	Absolute
Win	Keenan Cornelius	Pts: 2x0	IBJJF World Jiu-Jitsu Championship	2016	Absolute
Win	Nicholas Meregali	Pts: 4x2	Copa Podio	2016	86 kg
Win	Dillon Danis	Pts: 0x0, Adv	Copa Podio	2016	86 kg
Win	Max Gimenis	Pts: 2x0	Copa Podio	2016	86 kg
Win	Diego Borges	Pts: 2x0	Copa Podio	2016	86 kg
Win	Erberth Santos	Pts: 6x0	Copa Podio	2016	86 kg
Win	Isaque Bahiense	Pts: 2x0	Copa Podio	2016	105 kg
Win	Cassio Francis	Toe hold	Copa Podio	2016	105 kg
Win	Fellipe Trovo	Pts: 8x0	Copa Podio	2016	105 kg
Win	Nelton Pontes	Pts: 0x0, Adv	Copa Podio	2016	105 kg
Win	Alexander Trans	Pts: 2x0	Copa Podio	2016	105 kg
Win	Yuto Hirao	Brabo choke	Pan Jiu-Jitsu Championship	2015	Absolute
Win	James Puopolo	Pts: 13x0	Pan Jiu-Jitsu Championship	2015	Absolute
Win	Yuri Simoes	Pts: 4x2	Pan Jiu-Jitsu Championship	2015	Absolute
Win	Leo Nogueira	Pts: 2x0	Pan Jiu-Jitsu Championship	2015	Absolute
Loss	Bernardo Faria	Lapel choke	Pan Jiu-Jitsu Championship	2015	Absolute
Win	Cris Atkins	Brabo choke	Pan Jiu-Jitsu Championship	2015	Absolute
Win	Bruno Antunes	Pts: 13x0	Pan Jiu-Jitsu Championship	2015	82 kg
Win	Felipe Cesar	Cross choke	Pan Jiu-Jitsu Championship	2015	82 kg
Win	Victor Estima	Pts: 4x2	Pan Jiu-Jitsu Championship	2015	82 kg
Win	Otavio Sousa	Pts: 5x2	Pan Jiu-Jitsu Championship	2015	82 kg
Win	Max Carvalho	Pts: 6x0	World Pro	2015	82 kg
Win	Igor Basilio	Cross choke	World Pro	2015	85 kg
Win	Felipe Sagat	Toe hold	World Pro	2015	85 kg
Win	AJ Sousa	Points	World Pro	2015	85 kg
Win	Victor Estima	Pts: 0x0, Adv	World Pro	2015	85 kg
Win	Victor Silverio	Pts: 4x2	World Pro	2015	85 kg
Win	Felipe Bueno	Pts: 0x0, Adv	World Pro	2015	Absolute
Win	Max Carvalho	Pts: 3x0	World Pro	2015	Absolute
Loss	Marcus Almeida	Pts: 2x2, Adv	World Pro	2015	Absolute
Win	Keenan Cornelius	Pts: 4x2	World Pro	2015	Absolute
Win	Sérgio Moraes	Pts: 6x0	Copa Podio	2015	Absolute
Win	Tarcísio Jardim	Pts: 9x4	IBJJF World Jiu-Jitsu Championship	2015	Absolute
Win	Keenan Cornelius	Pts: 8x6	IBJJF World Jiu-Jitsu Championship	2015	Absolute
Loss	Bernardo Faria	Armbar	IBJJF World Jiu-Jitsu Championship	2015	Absolute
Win	Matheus Diniz	Pts: 4x0	IBJJF World Jiu-Jitsu Championship	2015	Absolute
Win	Renato Cardoso	Pts: 15x2	IBJJF World Jiu-Jitsu Championship	2015	88 kg
Win	Tarsis Humphreys	Pts: 7x0	IBJJF World Jiu-Jitsu Championship	2015	88 kg
Win	Rodrigo Freitas	Pts: 0x0, Adv	Santa Cruz Pro	2015	88 kg
Win	Julian Marquez	Cross choke	Santa Cruz Pro	2015	82 kg
Win	John Roberts	Cross choke	Pan Jiu-Jitsu Championship	2014	Absolute
Win	Fabiano Leite	Points	Pan Jiu-Jitsu Championship	2014	Absolute
Win	Victor Estima	Points	Pan Jiu-Jitsu Championship	2014	Absolute
Win	Alexander Trans	Points	Pan Jiu-Jitsu Championship	2014	Absolute
Loss	André Galvão	Adv	Pan Jiu-Jitsu Championship	2014	Absolute
Win	Julian Marquez	DQ	Pan Jiu-Jitsu Championship	2014	82 kg
Win	Charles Negromonte	Pts: 4x2	Pan Jiu-Jitsu Championship	2014	82 kg
Win	Victor Estima	Pts: 5x0	Pan Jiu-Jitsu Championship	2014	82 kg
Win	Otavio Sousa	Adv	Pan Jiu-Jitsu Championship	2014	82 kg
Win	Alexandre Souza	Pts: 4x0	Copa Podio	2014	94 kg
Win	Faisal Kitbe	Pts: 0x0, Adv	Copa Podio	2014	94 kg
Win	Alan Belcher	Choke from back	Copa Podio	2014	94 kg
D	Rodolfo Vieira	---	Copa Podio	2014	94 kg
Win	Luiz Panza	Pts: 6x4	Copa Podio	2014	94 kg
Loss	Rodolfo Vieira	Choke from back	Copa Podio	2014	94 kg
Win	Hamzeh Rasheed	Armbar	Copa Podio	2014	77 kg
Win	Simone Franceschini	Cross choke	Copa Podio	2014	77 kg
Win	Gregor Gracie	Pts: 8x2	Copa Podio	2014	77 kg
Win	Victor Silverio	Pts: 8x0	Copa Podio	2014	77 kg
Win	Gregor Gracie	Armbar	Copa Podio	2014	77 kg
Win	Luke Costello	Points	World Pro	2014	Absolute
Win	Rodrigo Fajardo	Pts: 14x0	World Pro	2014	Absolute
Win	Nivaldo Oliveira	Pts: 9x0	World Pro	2014	Absolute
Loss	Rodolfo Vieira	Choke from back	World Pro	2014	Absolute
Win	Luca Anacoreta	Pts: 4x0	World Pro	2014	82 kg
Win	Otavio Sousa	Points	World Pro	2014	82 kg
Win	Victor Estima	Referee Decision	World Pro	2014	82 kg
Win	Omar Saba	Cross choke	IBJJF World Jiu-Jitsu Championship	2014	Absolute
Loss	Keenan Cornelius	Pts: 6x4	IBJJF World Jiu-Jitsu Championship	2014	Absolute
Win	Kawazoe	Pts: 28x0	IBJJF World Jiu-Jitsu Championship	2014	82 kg
Win	Tulio Rosario	Mounted X choke	IBJJF World Jiu-Jitsu Championship	2014	82 kg
Win	Sean Roberts	Pts: 6x0	IBJJF World Jiu-Jitsu Championship	2014	82 kg
Win	Victor Silverio	Adv	IBJJF World Jiu-Jitsu Championship	2014	82 kg
Win	Victor Estima	Pts: 7x2	IBJJF World Jiu-Jitsu Championship	2014	82 kg
Win	Otavio Sousa	Pts: 9x6	IBJJF World Jiu-Jitsu Championship	2014	82 kg
Win	Caio Almeida	Cross choke	Mundial CBJJE	2014	Absolute
Win	Claudio Calasans	Pts: 4x2	Mundial CBJJE	2014	Absolute
Win	Keenan Cornelius	Pts: 6x2	NYC Pro	2014	94 kg
Win	Gilbert Burns	Cross choke	Copa Podio	2014	82 kg
Win	Lucas Valle	Pts: 10x0	The Team	2014	76 kg
Win	Takahiro Kanda	Pts: 21x0	All Japan NoGi	2014	88 kg
Win	Ryo Chonan	Pts: 4x0	All Japan NoGi	2014	Absolute
Win	Ichitaro Tsukada	Cross choke	All Japan	2014	Absolute
Win	Lucas Rocha	Choke from back	Arizona Open	2013	82 kg
Win	Augusto Mendes	Points	Arizona Open	2013	Absolute
D	Jake Shields	---	World Expo	2013	Absolute
Win	Renato Cardoso	Pts: 15x4	Pan Am. CBJJE	2013	Absolute
Win	Rodrigo Ribeiro	Points	Pan Am. CBJJE	2013	Absolute
Win	Jake Mackenzie	Points	Pan Am. CBJJE	2013	Absolute
Win	Augusto Mendes	Pts: 5x2	Copa Podio	2013	Absolute
Win	Felipe Preguiça	Pts: 3x2	Copa Podio	2013	Absolute
Win	Bernardo Filho	Mounted X choke	Pan Jiu-Jitsu Championship	2013	Absolute
Loss	Orlando Sanchez	Referee Decision	Pan Jiu-Jitsu Championship	2013	Absolute
Win	Sean Roberts	Mounted X choke	Pan Jiu-Jitsu Championship	2013	82 kg
Loss	Vitor Oliveira	Points	Pan Jiu-Jitsu Championship	2013	82 kg
Win	Roberto de Souza	Points	World Pro	2013	76 kg
Win	Lucas Lepri	Pts: 0x0, Adv	World Pro	2013	76 kg
Win	Claudio Calasans	Points	Copa Podio	2013	82 kg
Win	Luis Rosa	N/A	IBJJF World Jiu-Jitsu Championship	2013	Absolute
Win	Orlando Sanchez	Pts: 6x0	IBJJF World Jiu-Jitsu Championship	2013	Absolute
Loss	Bernardo Faria	Points	IBJJF World Jiu-Jitsu Championship	2013	Absolute
Win	Vinicius Marinho	Pts: 6x2	IBJJF World Jiu-Jitsu Championship	2013	76 kg
Win	Lucas Lepri	Adv	IBJJF World Jiu-Jitsu Championship	2013	76 kg
Win	Michael Langhi	Pts: 2x0	IBJJF World Jiu-Jitsu Championship	2013	76 kg
Win	Diego Borges	Adv	Copa Podio	2013	76 kg
Win	Brandon Magana	Pts: 18x0	Copa Podio	2013	76 kg
Win	Clark Gracie	Pts: 13x0	Copa Podio	2013	76 kg
Win	Juan Kamezawa	Pts: 10x0	Copa Podio	2013	76 kg
Win	DJ Jackson	Pts: 6x2	Copa Podio	2013	76 kg
Win	Diego Borges	Adv	Copa Podio	2013	76 kg
Win	Leandro Brassoloto	Bow and arrow	Brasileiro CBJJE	2013	Absolute
Win	Rodrigo Ribeiro	Armbar	Brasileiro CBJJE	2013	Absolute
Win	Cassio Francis	Points	Brasileiro CBJJE	2013	Absolute
Win	Juarez Harles	Kimura	Mundial CBJJE	2013	82 kg
Win	Alan Finfou	Pts: 2x0	Mundial CBJJE	2013	82 kg
Win	Diogo Almeida	Pts: 12x0	Mundial CBJJE	2013	82 kg
Win	Diogo Almeida	Points	Mundial CBJJE	2013	Absolute
Win	Leandro Brassoloto	Cross choke	Mundial CBJJE	2013	Absolute
Win	Augusto Vieira	N/A	Rio Open	2013	82 kg
Win	Alan Finfou	Armbar	Rio Open	2013	82 kg
Win	Unknown	Points	Rio Open	2013	Absolute
Win	Felipe Pena	Pts: 0x0, Adv	Rio Open	2013	Absolute
Win	Joao Rocha	Pts: 0x0, Adv	Rio Open	2013	Absolute
Loss	Gilbert Burns	Pts: 3x0	World No-Gi Championship	2013	79 kg
Win	James Puopolo	Adv	World No-Gi Championship	2013	Absolute
Win	Luiz Supp	Cross choke	Brasil Sul Cup	2012	Absolute
Win	Alexandre Souza	Pts: 2x0	Brasil Sul Cup	2012	Absolute
Win	Ricardo Bastos	Pts: 2x0	Brasil Sul Cup	2012	Absolute
Win	Victor Schlosser	Pts: 6x6, Adv	Pan Jiu-Jitsu Championship	2012	Absolute
Loss	Antonio Carlos	Flying triangle	Pan Jiu-Jitsu Championship	2012	Absolute
Win	Italo Lins	Points	Pan Jiu-Jitsu Championship	2012	76 kg
Win	Zak Maxwell	Pts: 13x2	Pan Jiu-Jitsu Championship	2012	76 kg
Win	Philipe Della Monica	Pts: 16x0	Pan Jiu-Jitsu Championship	2012	76 kg
Win	Lucas Lepri	Pts: 2x0	Pan Jiu-Jitsu Championship	2012	76 kg
Win	Dimitrius Souza	Pts: 2x0	Copa Podio	2012	85 kg
D	Felipe Preguiça	---	Copa Podio	2012	85 kg
Win	Rafael Barbosa	Pts: 3x0	Copa Podio	2012	85 kg
D	Otavio Sousa	---	Copa Podio	2012	85 kg
Win	Ricardo Bastos	Pts: 8x2	Copa Podio	2012	85 kg
Win	Dimitrius Souza	Pts: 7x0	Copa Podio	2012	85 kg
Win	Antonio Farias	Points	World Pro	2012	76 kg
Loss	Lucas Lepri	Points	World Pro	2012	76 kg
Win	Ed Ramos	Points	Brasileiro	2012	76 kg
Win	Michael Langhi	Pts: 2x0	Brasileiro	2012	76 kg
Loss	Antonio Peinado	Referee Decision	Brasileiro	2012	Absolute
Win	Alexandre Ceconi	Pts: 0x0, Adv	IBJJF World Jiu-Jitsu Championship	2012	Absolute
Loss	Antonio Carlos	Pts: 2x2, Adv	IBJJF World Jiu-Jitsu Championship	2012	Absolute
Win	Alessandro Ferreia	Pts: 23x0	IBJJF World Jiu-Jitsu Championship	2012	76 kg
Win	Theodoro Canal	Points	IBJJF World Jiu-Jitsu Championship	2012	76 kg
Win	Rodrigo Caporal	Pts: 21x0	IBJJF World Jiu-Jitsu Championship	2012	76 kg
Win	Roberto de Souza	Pts: 7x2	IBJJF World Jiu-Jitsu Championship	2012	76 kg
Win	Lucas Lepri	Pts: 2x0	IBJJF World Jiu-Jitsu Championship	2012	76 kg
Win	Lucas Lepri	Pts: 0x0, Adv	IBJJF Pro League	2012	82 kg
Win	Raymond Ayalla	Pts: 45x0	World No-Gi Championship	2012	76 kg
Loss	Augusto Mendes	Pts: 9x0	World No-Gi Championship	2012	76 kg
Win	Diego Herzog	Pts: 4x0	World No-Gi Championship	2012	Absolute
Win	DJ Jackson	Pts: 0x0, Adv	World No-Gi Championship	2012	Absolute
Win	Antonio Peinado	Pts: 0x0, Adv	World No-Gi Championship	2012	Absolute
Loss	Alexandre Ribeiro	Pts: 0x0, Adv	World No-Gi Championship	2012	Absolute
Loss	Gilbert Burns	Pts: 2x0	World ProTrials	2011	77 kg
Loss	Augusto Mendes	Pts: 4x0	Pan Jiu-Jitsu Championship	2011	76 kg
Win	Zak Maxwell	Pts: 6x0	World Pro	2011	76 kg
Win	Michael Langhi	Pts: 4x0	World Pro	2011	74 kg
Win	Celso Vinicius	Adv	World Pro	2011	74 kg
Win	JT Torres	Points	Brasileiro	2011	74 kg
Win	Augusto Mendes	Points	Brasileiro	2011	76 kg
Win	Michael Langhi	Adv	Brasileiro	2011	76 kg
Win	Tatsuya Kaneko	Armbar	IBJJF World Jiu-Jitsu Championship	2011	76 kg
Win	Unknown	Points	IBJJF World Jiu-Jitsu Championship	2011	76 kg
Loss	Kron Gracie	Choke from back	IBJJF World Jiu-Jitsu Championship	2011	76 kg
Win	Claudio Daniel	Referee Decision	Pan Am CBJJE	2011	76 kg
Win	Ricardo Evangelista	Bow and arrow	Pan Am CBJJE	2011	Absolute
Win	Fabiano Boi	Points	Pan Am CBJJE	2011	Absolute
Loss	Marcus Almeida	Pts: 6x6, Adv	Pan Am CBJJE	2011	Absolute
Win	Moacir Mendes	Pts: 2x2, Adv	Copa Podio	2011	Absolute
D	JT Torres	---	Copa Podio	2011	76 kg
Win	Ed Ramos	Pts: 7x0	Copa Podio	2011	76 kg
Win	Denilson Pimenta	Pts: 12x0	Copa Podio	2011	76 kg
Win	Vinicius Marinho	Pts: 5x2	Copa Podio	2011	76 kg
Win	Claudio Mattos	Choke from back	Copa Podio	2011	76 kg
Win	Claudevam Martins	Pts: 45x0	Amazon Meeting	2011	76 kg
Win	Antônio Carlos	Bow and arrow	Amazon Meeting	2011	76 kg
Win	Antonio Crivelari	Pts: 2x0	Brasileiro No-Gi	2011	76 kg
Win	Tiago Bravo	Pts: 8x2	Brasileiro No-Gi	2011	73 kg
Win	Theodoro Canal	Pts: 10x0	Brasileiro No-Gi	2011	73 kg
Win	Rodrigo Martins	Choke from back	Int. de Jiu-Jitsu	2011	73 kg
Win	Ivan	Pts: 13x0	Int. de Jiu-Jitsu	2011	76 kg
Win	Eduardo Silva	Lapel choke	Int. de Jiu-Jitsu	2011	76 kg

== Death and aftermath ==
In the early morning hours of 7 August 2022 at a São Paulo nightclub, Lo was shot in the head following an altercation. Lo was taken to hospital where he was declared brain dead. The alleged shooter, a police officer, was arrested the next evening after turning himself in.

Lo's funeral took place on 9 August 2022 at Morumbi Cemetery in São Paulo. Lo's fellow athletes, many wearing their Jiu-Jitsu Gi, lined the way from the chapel to the cemetery in a guard of honour, while his body was being carried in an open coffin.

The initial hearing for Lo's murder trial was scheduled for February 3, 2023. The day before the initial hearing was due to take place, it was postponed to March 24, 2023.
