= Alexander Boldizar =

Slovak-Canadian novelist

- Born: 1971 (age 54–55); Košice, Czechoslovakia (now Slovakia)
- Alma mater: McGill University; Harvard Law School
- Occupations: Novelist, lawyer, art critic
- Writing career
- Genres: Satire, science fiction, crime fiction, literary fiction
- Notable works: The Ugly (2016); The Man Who Saw Seconds (2024)
- Notable awards: Locus Award for Best Science Fiction Novel (2025), for The Man Who Saw Seconds
- Website: boldizar.com

Alexander Boldizar (born in Czechoslovakia, now Slovak Republic, 1971) is a writer, lawyer and art critic. He was the first post-independence Slovak citizen to graduate with a Juris Doctor degree from Harvard Law School. His writing has won the Locus Award for Best Science Fiction Novel of 2024, a PEN prize (PEN/Nob Hill), represented Bread Loaf Writers' Conference as a nominee for the Best New American Voices anthology, and received various other awards.

== Life ==
Born in Košice, Czechoslovakia, in 1971, Boldizar's family escaped to Austria via Yugoslavia in 1979. After six months in a refugee camp at Traiskirchen, Austria, Canada granted the family asylum. Boldizar became a Canadian citizen in 1983. He attended Merivale High School in Ottawa, where he was captain of the rugby team, followed by McGill University, from which he graduated in 1994 with the Brian Coughlan prize for highest GPA in the economics department. He also won the 1993 McGill Open Beer Mile championship.

Boldizar went on to study law at Harvard Law School, starting in the class of 1998 but finishing in the class of 1999 due to a year of absence during which he went to the Sahara (Niger, Africa) with a paleontological expedition for the Discovery Channel/National Geographic. During his last year, he was roommates with Samantha Power, the former U.S. ambassador to the United Nations.

Although Boldizar had renounced his Czechoslovak citizenship in 1989 so that he could attend the anticommunist demonstrations as a noncitizen (during which he was almost arrested anyway), President Rudolf Schuster of Slovakia revived Boldizar's citizenship by special presidential order in 1999, making him the first Slovak citizen to graduate with a JD from Harvard. Boldizar's grandfather, Vojtech Zahorsky, was awarded the Kosice Prize (i.e., "keys to the city") for his contributions as a partisan during WWII and his service as the head of the Slovak Veteran's Association.

Boldizar currently lives in Vancouver, BC, Canada. He won first place in his division at the British Columbia Brazilian jiu-jitsu Championships in both 2010 and 2011, a gold medal at the 2011 Pan American Championships and a bronze at the 2013 World Masters Championships. He holds a black belt.

== Career ==
Boldizar worked briefly as an attorney at the San Francisco and Prague offices of Baker & McKenzie, before leaving law in order to write. He has been an art gallery director in Indonesia, a "host" in a hostess bar in Japan, a hermit in Tennessee, a paleontologists' guide in the Sahara, a porter on Bylot Island in the Canadian High Arctic, a speechwriter for the police-oversight New York City Civilian Complaint Review Board, and an editor of the first pan-Asian art magazine.

He has published over eighty articles in fiction venues like Transition Magazine, Fiction International, Chicago Quarterly Review, Literary Imagination, and Phantasmagoria, nonfiction venues like Harper's Bazaar, The Globe and Mail, Shambhala Sun, Liberty, C-Arts Magazine, and Harvard Law Record, and legal venues like the European Journal of International Law and Golden Gate Law Review. He worked as an editor of C-Arts Magazine, a contemporary art magazine published out of Singapore, for which he has interviewed artists like Damien Hirst and Ashley Bickerton.

His first novel titled The Ugly, published by Brooklyn Arts Press, follows the life of Muzhduk the Ugli the Fourth, a member of a lost tribe of boulder-throwing Slovaks living in the mountains of Siberia whose land is stolen by American lawyers. An absurdist satire of law, The Ugly was named one of the "Best Books of 2016: Best Fiction" by Entropy magazine.

The novel also received academic attention. In a 2025 EU report on the Cartography of the Political Novel in Europe, Charles Sabatos of Yeditepe University described The Ugly alongside Peter Pišťanek's Rivers of Babylon as a satire that portrays "the political and psychological traumas of the post-Communist era through the concepts of exile and tribalism." In her published response, Nina Weller of the Leibniz Centre for Literary and Cultural Research in Berlin described the two books as "two of the most important novels in the field of Slovakian literature of the last three decades."

Boldizar's second novel, released in 2024, is titled The Man Who Saw Seconds, about Preble Jefferson, who can see five seconds into the future. This causes him to come into conflict against the New York City Police Department, and later the federal government. The novel won the 2025 Locus Award for Best Science Fiction Novel.

In October 2025, Publisher's Weekly reported that Simon & Schuster had acquired world English rights to Boldizar's third novel, Ride or Die Girl, described as a "darkly absurdist crime novel," from Mark Tavani at the David Black Agency. The novel, about the girlfriend of a British Columbia gangster, is scheduled for publication on January 19, 2027.

The Harvard Law Record published a profile of Boldizar's career in March 2010. He has also been profiled on CBC Books, Allie Bates' Novelspot and on Slovak Spectrum television. Kanadsky Slovak newspaper named him one of the most notable Slovaks "in Canada and probably in North America."

== Style ==
Boldizar has been described as "a boisterous Borges" and writes in the existentialist satire and dark humor tradition of writers like Heller, Kafka, Musil, Hrabal, Borges, and Laurence Sterne.
