= Brazilian Nationals Jiu-Jitsu No-Gi Championship =

Brazilian Jiu-Jitsu competitions

Brazilian Nationals No-Gi Brazilian Jiu-Jitsu Championship
Competition details
- Location: Rio de Janeiro, Brazil
- Nickname(s): Nogi Brasileiro
- Discipline: Brazilian Jiu-Jitsu
- Type: Nogi
- Organiser: CBJJ

History
- First edition: 2009
- Editions: 8
- Most wins: Male Raul Gomes (4) Female Beatriz Mesquita, Talita Nogueira (7)

Brazilian Nationals Jiu-Jitsu No-Gi Championship is a no-gi Brazilian Jiu-Jitsu (BJJ) tournament hosted annually by the CBJJ since 2009 in Rio de Janeiro, Brazil.

== Men's champions ==
Year	Host	51.5 kg Galo	56.5 kg Pluma	61.5 kg Pena	66.5 kg Leve	71.5 kg Medio	76.5 kg M Pesado	81.5 kg Pesado	86.5 kg S Pesado	+86.5 kg U Pesado	Absoluto
2009	(Brazil)		(Brazil) Bruno Malfacine (1/1)	(Brazil) Raoni Barcelos (1/1)	(Brazil) Michael Langhi (1/1)	(Brazil) Tiago Alves (1/2)	(Brazil) Felipe Silva (1/2)	(Brazil) Bernardo Faria (1/1)	(Brazil) Fabricio Do Couto (1/1)	(Brazil) Igor Silva (fighter) (1/1)	(Brazil) Murilo Santana (1/2)
2010	(Brazil)		(Brazil) Rufino Neto (1/1)	(Brazil) Leonardo Silva (1/1)	(Brazil) Davi Ramos (1/1)	(Brazil) Tiago Alves (2/2)	(Brazil) Kleber Buiú (1/3)	(Brazil) Rafael Costa (1/1)	(Brazil) Antonio Peinado (1/1)	(Brazil) Luiz Theodoro (1/1)	(Brazil) Victor Costa (1/1)
2011	(Brazil)	(Brazil) Marcus Oliveira (1/1)	(Brazil) Thiago Teixeira (1/1)	(Brazil) Herbert Burns (1/2)	(Brazil) Leandro Lo (1/3)	(Brazil) Murilo Santana (2/2)	(Brazil) Kleber Buiú(2/3)	(Brazil) Mauro Celso (1/2)	(Brazil) Frederico Zaganelli (1/1)	(Brazil) Bruno Bastos (1/1)	(Brazil) Kleber Buiú (3/3)
2012	(Brazil)	(Brazil) Raul Gomes (1/4)	(Brazil) Douglas Rufino (1/2)	(Brazil) Herbert Burns (2/2)	(Brazil) Leandro Lo (2/3)	(Brazil) Vinícius Marinho (1/2)	(Brazil) Alberto Oliveira(1/1)	(Brazil) Leonardo Maciel (1/1)	(Brazil) Mauro Celso (2/2)	(Brazil) Bruno Soares (1/1)	(Brazil) Leandro Lo (3/3)
2013	(Brazil)	(Brazil) Raul Gomes (2/4)	(Brazil) Douglas Rufino (2/2)	(Brazil) José Barros (1/3)	(United States) AJ Agazarm (1/1)	(Brazil) Vinícius Marinho (2/2)	(Brazil) Claudio Cardoso(1/2)	(Brazil) Luiz Panza (1/2)	(Brazil) Salomão Ribeiro (1/1)	(Brazil) Gabriel Lyrio Lucas (1/1)	(Brazil) Luiz Panza (2/2)
2014	(Brazil)	(Brazil) Raul Gomes (3/4)	(Brazil) Paulo Melo (1/1)	(Brazil) Rafael do Nascimento (1/1)	(Brazil) Marcio Barbosa Jr (1/1)	(Canada) Jacob Mackenzie (1/1)	(Brazil) Charles Negromonte (1/1)	(Brazil) Marcus dos Santos (1/1)	(Brazil) Cristiano Lazzarini (1/2)	(Brazil) Cássio da Silva (1/2)	(Brazil) Cristiano Lazzarini (2/2)
2015	(Brazil)	(Brazil) Leandro Escobar(1/1)	(Brazil) Philipe de Oliveira (1/1)	(Brazil) José Barros (2/3)	(Brazil) Thiago Gaia (1/1)	(Brazil) Felipe Silva (2/2)	(Brazil) Patrick Gaudio (1/1)	(Brazil) Diogo Araujo (1/1)	(Brazil) Cássio da Silva (2/2)	(Brazil) Otavio Serafim (1/1)	(Brazil) Dimitrius Souza (1/3)
2016	(Brazil)	(Brazil) Raul Gomes(4/4)	(Brazil) Hiago Silva (1/2)	(Brazil) Isaque Paiva (1/1)	(Brazil) Kim Terra (1/1)	(Brazil) Edson de Oliveira (1/1)	(Brazil) Claudio Cardoso (2/2)	(Brazil) Dimitrius Souza (2/3)	(Brazil) Max Gimenis (1/1)	(Brazil) Antonio de Padua (1/1)	(Brazil) Dimitrius Souza (3/3)
2017	(Brazil)	(Brazil) Juan da Silva (1/1)	(Brazil) Hiago Silva (2/2)	(Brazil) Jose Barros (3/3)	(Brazil) Thiago Abreu (1/2)	(Brazil) Matheus Barros (1/1)	(Brazil) Gabriel de Lima (1/1)	(Brazil) Henrique Russi (1/1)	(Brazil) Fernando Andrade dos Reis (1/1)	(Brazil) Ricardo Evangelista (1/1)	(Brazil) Kitner Mendonça (1/1)
2018	(Brazil)	(Brazil) Cleber Fernandes (1/1)	(Brazil) Alexandre Vieira (1/1)	(Brazil) Thiago Abreu (2/2)	(Brazil) Hugo Marques (1/2)	(Brazil) Pedro Souza (1/1)	(Brazil) Thiago Fortes Silva (1/1)	(Brazil) Vinicius Gazola (1/1)	(Brazil) Antonio Neto (1/1)	(Brazil) Hugo Marques (2/2)	
2019	(Brazil)	(Brazil) Cícero Livio (1/1)	(Brazil) Joao Miyao (1/1)	(Brazil) Alexsandro Sodré (1/1)	(Brazil) Ygor Rodrigues (1/1)	(Brazil) Marco Aurelio (1/1)	(Brazil) Pedro Rocha (1/1)	(Brazil) Rômulo Azevedo (1/1)	(Brazil) Marcelo Gomide (1/1)	(Brazil) Hugo Cunha (1/1)	(Brazil) Rafael Paganini (1/1)

== Women's champions ==
Year	Host	-46.5 kg Galo	-51.5 kg Pluma	-56.5 kg Pena	-61.5 kg Leve	-66.5 kg Medio	-71.5 kg M Pesado	-76.5 kg Pesado	+76.5 kg S Pesado	Absoluto
2009	(Brazil)		(Brazil) Elizangela Meireles (1/2)	(Brazil) Hellen Teixeira (1/1)	(Brazil) Beatriz Mesquita (1/7)	(Brazil) Rosalind Ferreira (1/3)	(Brazil) Talita Nogueira (1/7)	(Brazil) Luciana Pinto (1/1)		(Brazil) Talita Nogueira (2/7)
2010	(Brazil)		(Brazil) Bruna Nascimento (1/2)		(Brazil) Marina Ribeiro (1/1)	(Brazil) Rosalind Ferreira (2/3)	(Brazil) Luiza Monteiro (1/2)	(Brazil) Karla Hipolito (1/1)		(Brazil) Michelle Tavares (1/2)
2011	(Brazil)		(Brazil) Bruna Nascimento (2/2)	(Brazil) Michelle Tavares (2/2)	(Brazil) Beatriz Mesquita (2/7)	(Brazil) Rosalind Ferreira (3/3)	(Brazil) Luiza Monteiro (2/2)	(Brazil) Luzia Carmem (1/1)		(Brazil) Beatriz Mesquita (3/7)
2012	(Brazil)			(Brazil) Elizangela Meireles (2/2)			(Brazil) Maria Teixeira (1/1)	(Brazil) Talita Nogueira (3/7)		(Brazil) Talita Nogueira (4/7)
2013	(Brazil)							(Brazil) Talita Nogueira (5/7)		(Brazil) Talita Nogueira (6/7)
2014	(Brazil)			(Brazil) Marília da Conceição (1/2)		(Brazil) Beatriz Mesquita (4/7)			(Brazil) Talita Nogueira (7/7)	(Brazil) Beatriz Mesquita (5/7)
2015	(Brazil)				(Brazil) Marília da Conceição (2/2)	(Brazil) Glaucia Libano (1/1)		(Brazil) Andresa Correa (1/2)		(Brazil) Andresa Correa (2/2)
2016	(Brazil)					(Brazil) Beatriz Mesquita (6/7)				(Brazil) Beatriz Mesquita (7/7)
2017	(Brazil)				(Brazil) Juliana Simoes (1/1)	(Brazil) Ana Maria Soares (1/1)		(Brazil) Carina Santi (1/4)		(Brazil) Carina Santi (2/4)
2018	(Brazil)			(Brazil) Maysa Bastos (1/1)				(Brazil) Carina Santi (3/4)		(Brazil) Carina Santi (4/4)

== See also ==
- IBJJF
- World Jiu-Jitsu Championship
- World No-Gi Championship
- Pan Jiu-Jitsu Championship
- Pan Jiu-Jitsu No-Gi Championship
- European Open Championship
- European Open Nogi Championship
- Brazilian National Jiu-Jitsu Championship
- Asian Open Championship
