= Nicholas Meregali =

Brazilian jiu-jitsu practitioner from Brazil

- Born: 27 May 1994 (age 32); Rio Grande do Sul, Brazil
- Nickname: Alemão
- Height: 6 ft 3 in (1.91 m)
- Division: Super-heavyweight -100.5 kilograms (222 lb)
- Team: New Wave Jiu Jitsu; Dream Art; Alliance Jiu Jitsu
- Rank: Black belt in BJJ

Nicholas Meregali (born 27 May 1994) is a Brazilian submission grappler and Brazilian jiu-jitsu (BJJ) black belt competitor. A multiple time world, Pan, European and Brazilian champion at colored belts, Meregali is a 3x IBJJF black belt World Champion and a 2x ADCC World medallist.

== Early career ==
Nicholas de Barcellos Meregali was born on 27 May 1994, in Santo Antônio in the Brazilian state of Rio Grande do Sul. Meregali began training when he was 16 years old at the ACJJ academy in Santo Antônio da Patrulha. Considered one of the best coloured belts in the world, Meregali won every IBJJF Jiu-Jitsu Championship at purple belt; he then won at brown belt two double gold world titles making him a five-time world champion. Reis promoted Meregali to black belt after his 2016 world title.

== Black belt career ==
During his first year as black belt Meregali won the 2017 World Jiu-Jitsu Championship by beating division favourite Leandro Lo, one of the greatest BJJ competitors of all time, 2–0 in the final. The next year, Meregali won gold medal in the Super Heavyweight division of the Brazilian National Jiu-Jitsu Championship, submitting his opponent from the back in the final. In 2019, Meregali won the Brazilian national title again and added the open weight class title to earn "double gold." In 2019 he became world champion again in the Super Heavyweight division.

=== 2021 ===
Before the 2021 World Championship, Meregali left Alliance to join the Dream Art Project. After showing his middle finger to a spectator who was heckling him, Meregali was disqualified from the 2021 World Championship halfway through the ultra-heavyweight semi-final match, before the disqualification, he was considered to be on track to win both gold at his weight division and in Absolute.

=== 2022 ===
At the 2022 World Jiu-Jitsu Championship Meregali won the title for the third time in Absolute and Silver in his division.

In interviews he has described himself as a perfectionist. Meregali has been described as having a "complete game," and he is known for his outstanding guard, especially his innovative use of the De La Riva position, and chokes from the back.

Meregali transitioned to no gi competition in 2022, making his debut against Arnaldo Maidana at Who's Number One and winning by armbar. In preparation for his first attempt at the ADCC world championships, Meregali started training No-Gi at the New Wave Jiu Jitsu academy in Austin, Texas, under head coach John Danaher. Meregali won a bronze medal in the under 99 kg division of the 2022 ADCC World Championship, losing to Craig Jones in the semifinal, and won silver in the openweight division, defeating Tye Ruotolo in the semi-final before losing to Yuri Simões in the final.

=== 2023 ===
A rematch between Meregali and Jones was scheduled for February 2023 at Who's Number One but was postponed indefinitely when Jones was unable to compete due to other commitments. Meregali then returned to gi competition at the IBJJF Pan Championship 2023. He won a gold medal in both the ultra-heavyweight division, and in the absolute division.

Meregali was booked to compete in the main event of Who's Number One 18 on May 18, 2023, against Pedro Marinho in the promotion's first ever gi match. During the build-up to the match, Meregali announced his decision to no longer compete in IBJJF events. Meregali won the match, submitting Marinho with a mounted triangle choke.

Meregali was scheduled to compete against Roberto "Cyborg" Abreu at UFC Fight Pass Invitational 4 on June 29, 2023. He won the match by armbar in EBI overtime.

Meregali competed in the main event of Who's Number One 19 against Kaynan Duarte in the fifth match between them on August 10, 2023. He won the match by submission, with an arm-triangle choke.

Meregali was invited to compete in the IBJJF Absolute Grand Prix 2023 for the grand prize of $40,000 on September 1, 2023. He defeated three opponents and won the tournament.

Meregali competed against Felipe Pena in the co-main event of UFC Fight Pass Invitational 5 on December 9, 2023. He won the match by submission with a rear-naked choke.

Meregali won 'Male Grappler of the Year (Gi)' at the JitsMagazine BJJ Awards 2023.

=== 2024 ===
Meregali faced Matheus Diniz in a superfight at UFC Fight Pass Invitational 6 on March 2, 2024. He won the match by submission.

Meregali faced Vagner Rocha in the main event of Who's Number One 23 on May 10, 2024. He won the match by submission.

Meregali was invited to compete in the under 99 kg division at the 2024 ADCC World Championship. He submitted Marcin Maciulewicz in the opening round and was submitted by Michael Pixley in the quarter-final, dislocating his shoulder in the process and marking the first time he was submitted as a black belt. He later confirmed that the injury required surgery and he could not compete for at least 5 months.

== Brazilian jiu-jitsu competitive summary ==
Main achievements (black belt):

- IBJJF World Champion (2017 / 2019 / 2022 (Note: Absolute))
- CBJJ Brazilian Nationals Champion (2018 / 2019 (Note: Weight and absolute) / 2022)
- BJJ Stars Grand Prix winner (2019)
- Best throw at ADCC World Championship (2022)
- 2nd Place IBJJF World Championship (2022)
- 2nd Place ADCC World Championship Absolute (2022)
- 3rd Place IBJJF World Championship (2018)
- 3rd Place IBJJF Pan American Championship (2017)
- 3rd Place ADCC World Championship -99KG (2022)

Main achievements (coloured belts):

- IBJJF World Champion (2016 brown, 2015/2014 purple)
- UAEJJF Abu Dhabi Pro winner (2016/2015 brown, 2014 purple)
- IBJJF European Open Champion (2016 brown, 2014 purple)
- IBJJF Pan Champions (2016 brown, 2015/2014 purple)
- CBJJ Brazilian Nationals Champion (2015/2014 purple, 2013 blue)
- 2nd Place CBJJ Brazilian Nationals (2013 blue)
- 2nd Place IBJJF World Championship (2014 purple)
- 2nd Place IBJJF European Open (2016 brown)
- 3rd Place IBJJF World Championship (2013 blue)
