= Fernanda Mazzelli =

Brazilian jiu-jitsu practitioner and Politician from Brazil

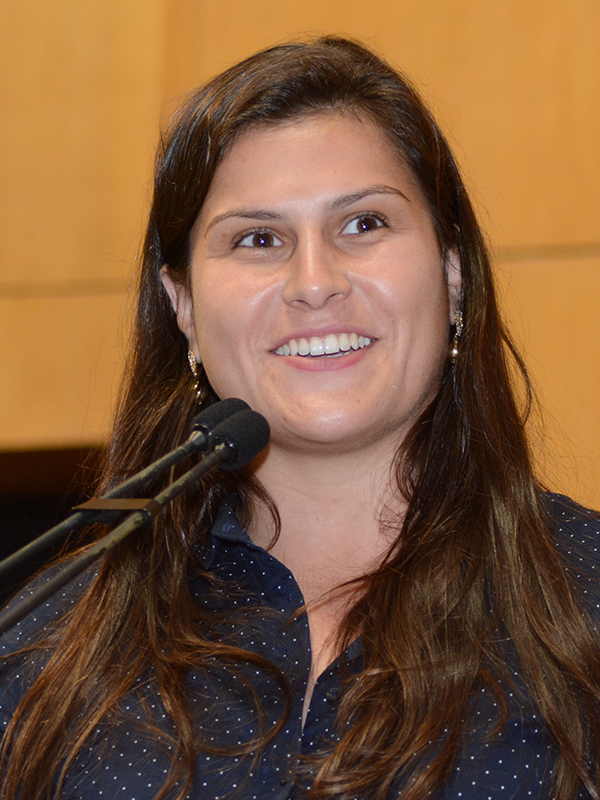
- Born: Fernanda Mazzelli Almeida Maio; 27 September 1988 (age 38)
- Division: medium-heavy / heavyweight -79 kilograms (174 lb)
- Style: Brazilian Jiu-Jitsu
- Team: Striker JJ
- Rank: BJJ black belt

Fernanda Mazzelli Almeida Maio (born 27 September 1988), also known as Fernanda Mazzelli, is a Brazilian grappler, a Brazilian jiu-jitsu black belt competitor and a politician. Competing in heavy and super heavyweight divisions, she is a 3x world champion and a 6x Brazilian nationals champion at both colored and black belt level. When not competing Mazzelli is an elected councilwoman for the Brazilian municipality of Guarapari.

== Biography ==
Fernanda Mazzelli Almeida Maio was born on 27 September 1988 in Guarapari the daughter of Fabiano Viola Maio and Roberta Mazzelli Almeida Maio. Her great-grandfather, Oswaldo Epaminondas de Almeida was the first elected mayor of Guarapari. She started training Brazilian Jiu-Jitsu (BJJ) at the age of 11. In 2006, she was part of the Brazilian Olympic Wrestling Team and in 2007, she participated in the Olympic Torch Relay. She received all her BJJ belts from the same trainer Thiago de Oliveira, a former student of Flavio "Dente" Ferreira, she was promoted to black belt on the podium of the Brazilian Nationals on 10 May 2008. Mazzelli graduated university in 2012 with a degree in physical education, she entered politics following her grandfather example who was the town's mayor. Running under Brazil's PSD (Social Democratic Party) she was elected councilwoman of her hometown. In 2012 she won the World Jiu-Jitsu Championship for the first time.

== Brazilian Jiu-Jitsu competitive summary ==
Main Achievements at black belt level:

- IBJJF World Champion (2012/2015/2016)
- IBJJF World No-Gi Champion (2012)
- Brazilian Nationals (2010 / 2012 / 2013 / 2014 / 2015 / 2022)
- 2nd place IBJJF World Championship (2013/2014/2019)
- 2nd place IBJJF Abu Dhabi World Pro (2016)
- 2nd place IBJJF European Open (2012)
- 2nd place IBJJF Pans Championship (2016)
- 2nd place IBJJF Brazilian Nationals (2011/2012 (Note: Absolute)/2016)
- 3rd place IBJJF World Championship (2009/2010/2011/2022)
- 3rd Place IBJJF World Championship No-Gi (2010)
- 3rd Place IBJJF European Open (2012)
- 3rd place IBJJF Brazilian Nationals (2011/2013/2016)

Main Achievements (Coloured Belts):

- CBJJ Brazilian Nationals (2003/2004 (Note: Weight and absolute) blue, 2005 purple, 2008 brown)
- 2nd place IBJJF World Championship (2005 purple)
- 3rd place IBJJF Brazilian Nationals (2005 purple, 2007 brown)
