= Campeonato Brasileiro de Jiu-Jitsu =

Brazilian Jiu-Jitsu competitions

Competition details
- Location: Barueri, Brazil
- Local name(s): Brasileiro
- Discipline: Brazilian Jiu-Jitsu
- Organiser: International Brazilian Jiu-Jitsu Federation

Divisions
- Current weight divisions: Ultra Heavyweight: over 221.0 lbs (+100.5 kg); Super Heavyweight: under 221.0 lbs (-100.5 kg); Heavyweight: under 207.5 lbs (-94.3 kg); Medium Heavyweight: under 194.5 lbs (-88.3 kg); Middleweight: under 181.0 lbs (-82.3 kg); Lightweight: under 167.5 lbs (-76 kg); Featherweight: under 154.0 lbs (-70 kg); Light Featherweight: under 141.0 lbs (-64 kg); Roosterweight: under 126.5 lbs (-57 kg) (with gi)

History
- First edition: 1996
- Editions: 21
- Most wins: Men Fredson Paixão (5) Women Bianca Barreto (13)

The Campeonato Brasileiro de Jiu-Jitsu (lit. Brazilian Jiu-Jitsu Championship), commonly known as Brasileiro, is an annual Brazilian Jiu-Jitsu (BJJ) tournament held in Brazil by the IBJJF. Brasileiro has been held annually since 1996, except for the year 2020 when it was canceled due to the COVID-19 pandemic in Brazil. Through 2012 the event was held at the Ginásio do Tijuca Tênis Clube in Rio de Janeiro; since 2013 it has been held at the Ginásio Poliesportivo José Corrêa in Barueri, São Paulo.

== History ==
The IBJJF gives tournaments weighting which helps calculate the number of points an athlete can win via their participation. For the 2017/2018 IBJJF calendar the Brazilian National has a weighting of 3. This puts it behind in weighting importance to the World Jiu-Jitsu Championship with a weighting of 7, the European Championship and Pans with weightings of 4 and alongside the Asian Open.

In 2023, the IBJJF announced that FloGrappling had bought exclusive streaming rights to the tournament and would be the only place to watch the Brazilian National Jiu-Jitsu Championship moving forward.

== Brazilian National Champions in Men's Brazilian Jiu Jitsu by Year and Weight ==
Year	57 kg	64 kg	70 kg	76 kg	82 kg	88 kg	94 kg	100 kg	+100 kg	Absolute
1996	(Brazil) Marcos Barreto (1/1)	(Brazil) Helio Moreira (1/1)	(Brazil) Alexandre Carneiro (1/1)	(Brazil) Eduardo Galvão (1/3)	(Brazil) Eduardo Conceicao (1/1)	(Brazil) Antonio Schembri (1/2)	(Brazil) Fabio Gurgel (1/1)	(Brazil) Roberto Magalhaes (1/1)	(Brazil) Daniel Simoes (1/3)	(Brazil) Antonio Schrembi (2/2)
1997	(Brazil)	Fredson Alves (Brazil) (1/1)	(Brazil) Paulo Coelo (1/1)	(Brazil) Eduardo Galvão (2/3)	(Brazil) Rafael Correa (1/2)	(Brazil) Ryan Gracie (1/1)	(Brazil) Eduardo Lima (1/1)	(Brazil) Bruno Severiano (1/1)	(Brazil) Daniel Simoes (2/3)	(Brazil) Rafael Correa (2/2)
1998	(Brazil) Marcelo Perreira (1/2)	(Brazil) Robson Moura (1/1)	(Brazil) Vítor Ribeiro (1/1)	(Brazil) Marcio Feitosa (1/4)	(Brazil) Leo Vieira (1/1)	(Brazil) Saulo Ribeiro (1/2)	(Brazil) Amauri Bitetti (1/2)	(Brazil) Renato Ferro (1/1)	(Brazil) Luis Guilherme (1/2)	(Brazil) Saulo Ribeiro (2/2)
1999	(Brazil) Marcelo Perreira (2/2)	(Brazil) Bruno Ximenes (1/1)	(Brazil) Marco Barbosa (1/1)	(Brazil) Marcio Feitosa (2/4)	(Brazil) Eduardo Galvão (2/2)	(Brazil) Eduardo Conceição (1/1)	(Brazil) Rodrigo Mederios (1/2)	(Brazil) Daniel Simoes (3/3)	(Brazil) Luis Guilherme (2/2)	(Brazil) Murilo Bustamante (1/1)
2000	(Brazil) Paulo Fragata (1/1)	(Brazil) Marcos Matta (1/1)	(Brazil) Fredson Paixão (1/5)	(Brazil) Marcio Feitosa (3/4)	(Brazil) Rodrigo Boni (1/1)	(Brazil) Fernando Pontes (1/1)	(Brazil) Amauri Bitetti (2/2)	(Brazil) Márcio Cruz (1/3)	(Brazil) Leonardo Leite (1/2)	(Brazil) Márcio Cruz (2/3)
2001	(Brazil) Bernardo Pitel (1/4)	(Brazil) Daniel Felipe (1/1)	(Brazil) Fredson Paixão (2/5)	(Brazil) Rodrigo Antonio (1/1)	(Brazil) Fernando Augusto (1/3)	(Brazil) Jefferson Moura (1/3)	(Brazil) Fabio Leopoldo (1/1)	(Brazil) Roberto Tozi (1/5)	(Brazil) Márcio Cruz (3/3)	(Brazil) Fernando Augusto (2/3)
2002	(Brazil) Marcos Norat (1/1)	(Brazil) Bibiano Fernandes (1/2)	(Brazil) Fredson Paixão (3/5)	(Brazil) Rafael Barbosa (1/1)	(Brazil) Gustavo Muggiati (1/1)	(Brazil) Marcel Lousado (1/1)	(Brazil) Roger Coelho (1/1)	(Brazil) Roberto Tozi (2/5)	(Brazil) Vinicius Antunes (1/2)	(Brazil) Alexandre Dantas (1/1)
2003	(Brazil) Daniel Moreno (1/1)	(Brazil) Bibiano Fernandes (2/2)	(Brazil) Fredson Paixão (4/5)	(Brazil) Marcio Feitosa (4/4)	(Brazil) Felipe Simao (1/1)	(Brazil) Rodrigo Pinheiro (1/1)	(Brazil) Eduardo Telles (1/1)	(Brazil) Roberto Tozi (3/5)	(Brazil) Alex Santos (1/1)	(Brazil) Fernando Augusto (3/3)
2004	(Brazil) Daniel Otero (1/1)	(Brazil) Carlos Holanda (1/3)	(Brazil) Fredson Paixão (5/5)	(Brazil) Rodrigo Magalhaes (1/1)	(Brazil) Marcelo Garcia (1/3)	(Brazil) Ronaldo Souza (1/1)	(Brazil) Xande Ribeiro (1/2)	(Brazil) Eric Wanderlei (1/1)	(Brazil) Claudio Godoi (1/1)	(Brazil) Xande Ribeiro (2/2)
2005	(Brazil) Gabriel Moraes (1/2)	(Brazil) Bernardo Pitel (2/4)	(Brazil) Bruno Frazatto (1/4)	(Brazil) Carlos Viera (2/3)	(Brazil) André Galvão (1/2)	(Brazil) Rodrigo Pinheiro (1/1)	(Brazil) Fernando Marqués (1/1)	(Brazil) Roberto Tozi (4/5)	(Brazil) Luiz Theodoro (1/1)	(Brazil) André Galvão (2/2)
2006	(Brazil) Gabriel Moraes (2/2)	(Brazil) Carlos Holanda (3/3)	(Brazil) Bruno Frazatto (2/4)	(Brazil) Alexandre Pimentel (1/1)	(Brazil) Marcelo Garcia (2/3)	(Brazil) Romulo Barral (1/2)	(Brazil) Jefferson Moura (2/3)	(Brazil) Rodrigo Medeiros (2/2)	(Brazil) Adriano Camonesi (1/1)	(Brazil) Marcelo Garcia (3/3)
2007	(Brazil) Felipe Costa (1/1)	(Brazil) Bernardo Pitel (3/4)	(Brazil) Jonathas Gurgel (1/1)	(Brazil) Celso Vinicius (1/1)	(Brazil) Murilo Santana (1/3)	(Brazil) Romulo Barral (2/2)	(Brazil) Roberto Tozi (5/5)	(United States) Rafael Lovato Jr. (1/1)	(Brazil) Luiz Theodoro (1/4)	(Brazil) Luiz Theodoro (2/4)
2008	(Brazil) Bruno Malfacine (1/4)	(Brazil) Bernardo Pitel (4/4)	(Brazil) Marcelino Freitas (1/1)	(Brazil) Michael Langhi (1/4)	(Brazil) Alan Nascimento (1/2)	(Brazil) Eduardo Santos (1/1)	(Brazil) Augusto Ferreira (1/1)	(Brazil) Antonio Braga Neto (1/2)	(Brazil) Rodrigo Cavaca (1/2)	(Brazil) Alexandre Souza (1/1)
2009	(Brazil) Bruno Malfacine (2/4)	(Brazil) Pablo Santos (1/1)	(Brazil) Bruno Frazatto (3/4)	(Brazil) Michael Langhi (2/4)	(Brazil) Alan Nascimento (2/2)	(Brazil) Raphael Abi Rihan (1/1)	(Brazil) Jefferson Moura (3/3)	(Brazil) Antonio Braga Neto (2/2)	(Brazil) Leonardo Leite (2/2)	(Brazil) Tarsis Humphreys (1/2)
2010	(Brazil) Bruno Malfacine (3/4)	(Brazil) Guilherme Mendes (1/1)	(Brazil) Rafael Mendes (1/1)	(Brazil) Gilbert Burns (1/1)	(Brazil) Murilo Santana (2/3)	(Brazil) Tarsis Humphreys (2/2)	(Brazil) Alexandre Ceconi (1/1)	(Brazil) Thiago Gaia (1/1)	(Brazil) Rodrigo Cavaco (2/2)	(Brazil) Bernardo Faria (1/1)
2011	(Brazil) Bruno Malfacine (4/4)	(Brazil) Ary Farias (1/1)	(Brazil) Bruno Frazatto (4/4)	(Brazil) Leandro Lo (1/4)	(Brazil) Daniel Garcia (1/1)	(Brazil) Sergio Moraes (1/1)	(Brazil) Tarcísio Jardim (1/1)	(Brazil) Ricardo Evangelista (1/1)	(Australia) Michael Wilson (1/1)	(Brazil) Leonardo Nogueira (1/2)
2012	(Brazil) Igor dos Santos (1/1)	(Brazil) José Barros (1/3)	(Brazil) Leonardo Saggorio (1/1)	(Brazil) Leandro Lo (2/4)	(Brazil) Murilo Santana (3/4)	(Brazil) Nivaldo Oliveira (1/2)	(Brazil) Alexandro Souza (1/1)	(Brazil) Leonardo Nogueira (2/2)	(Denmark) Alexander Trans (1/1)	(Brazil) Nivaldo Oliveira (2/2)
2013	(Brazil) Ivaniel Oliveira (1/3)	(Brazil) Pablo Santos (1/1)	(Brazil) Leonardo Saggorio (2/2)	(Brazil) Juan Silva (1/1)	(Brazil) Murilo Santana (4/4)	(Brazil) Rodrigo Fajardo (1/1)	(Brazil) Dimitrius Souza (1/4)	(Brazil) João Gabriel (1/2)	(Brazil) Ricardo Evangelista (1/1)	(United States) Rafael Lovato Jr. (1/1)
2014	(Brazil) Ivaniel Oliveira (2/3)	(Brazil) João Miyao (1/2)	(Brazil) Paulo Miyao (1/2)	(Brazil) Lucas Lepri (1/1)	(Brazil) Claudio Cardoso (1/1)	(Brazil) Felipe Pena (1/2)	(Brazil) Dimitrius Souza (2/4)	(Brazil) Cássio Silva (1/1)	(Brazil) Luiz Theodoro (3/4)	(Brazil) Felipe Pena (2/2)
2015	(Brazil) Ivaniel Oliveira (3/3)	(Brazil) João Miyao (2/2)	(Brazil) Paulo Miyao (2/3)	(Brazil) Luan Alves (1/1)	(Brazil) Augusto Vieira (1/1)	(Brazil) Renato Cardoso (1/2)	(Brazil) Cássio Silva (2/2)	(Brazil) Erbeth Santos (1/3)	(Brazil) João Gabriel (2/2)	(Brazil) Erbeth Santos (2/3)
2016	(Brazil) Rodnei Barbosa (1/1)	(Brazil) José Barros (2/3)	(Brazil) Paulo Miyao (3/3)	(Brazil) Michael Langhi (3/4)	(Brazil) Jhonny Loureiro (1/1)	(Brazil) Renato Cardoso (2/2)	(Brazil) Guilherme Augusto (1/1)	(Brazil) Alex Aparecido Soares (1/1)	(Brazil) Luiz Theodoro (4/4)	(Brazil) Erbeth Santos (3/3)
2017	(Brazil) Aniel Candido (1/1)	(Brazil) José Barros (3/3)	(Brazil) Rubens Charles (1/1)	(Brazil) Michael Langhi (4/4)	(Brazil) Jaime Canuto (1/1)	(Brazil) Patrick Gaudio (1/2)	(Brazil) Dimitrius Souza (3/4)	(Brazil) Leandro Lo (3/4)	(Brazil) Victor Honório (1/1)	(Brazil) Leandro Lo (4/4)
2018	(Brazil) Cleito Junior (1/1)	(Brazil) Hiago George (1/2)	(Brazil) Rafael Mansur (1/1)	(Brazil) Yan Paiva (1/1)	(Brazil) Marcos Tinoco (1/1)	(Brazil) Rudson Mateus (1/2)	(Brazil) Fellipe Silva (1/1)	(Brazil) Nicholas Meregali (1/4)	(Brazil) Felipe Bezerra (1/1)	(Brazil) Lucas Barbosa (1/1)
2019	(Brazil) Cleber Sousa (1/2)	(Brazil) Hiago George (2/2)	(United States) Isaac Doederlein (1/1)	(Brazil) Ygor Rodrigues (1/1)	(Brazil) Otávio Souza (1/1)	(Brazil) Rudson Mateus (2/2)	(Brazil) Vinicius "Trator" Ferreira (1/1)	(Brazil) Nicholas Meregali (2/4)	(Brazil) “Duzão" Lopes (1/1)	(Brazil) Nicholas Meregali (3/4)
2021	(Brazil) Yuri Hendrex (1/1)	(Brazil) Meyran Maquiné (1/1)	(Brazil) Fabrício Andrey (1/2)	(Brazil) Matheus Gabriel (1/1)	(Brazil) Leonardo Lara (1/1)	(Brazil) Maurício Oliveira (1/1)	(Brazil) Dimitrius Souza (4/4)	(Brazil) Erich Munis (1/2)	(Brazil) Yatan Bueno (1/1)	(Brazil) Erich Munis (2/2)
2022	(Brazil) Rodrigo Otávio (1/1)	(Brazil) Diogo Reis (1/2)	(Brazil) Fabrício Andrey (2/2)	(Argentina) Pablo Lavaselli (1/1)	(Brazil) Micael Galvão (1/2)	(Brazil) Matheus Spirandeli (1/1)	(Brazil) Rider Zuchi (1/1)	(Brazil) Nicholas Meregali (4/4)	(United States) Mason Fowler (1/1)	(Brazil) Gutemberg Pereira (1/1)
2023	(Brazil) Lucas Pinheiro (1/1)	(Brazil) Diogo Reis (2/2)	(United States) Isaac Doederlein (2/2)	(Brazil) Lucas Valente (1/1)	(Brazil) Tainan Dalpra (1/1)	(Brazil) Gustavo Batista (1/1)	(Brazil) Felipe Andrew (1/1)	(Brazil) Pedro Lucas (1/2)	(Brazil) Victor Hugo (1/2)	(Brazil) Victor Hugo (2/2)
2024	(Brazil) Thalison Soares (1/1)	(Brazil) Cleber Sousa (2/2)	(Brazil) Kennedy Maciel (1/1)	(Brazil) Pedro Maia (1/1)	(Brazil) Micael Galvão (2/2)	(Brazil) Gabriel Costa (1/1)	(Brazil) Patrick Gaudio (2/2)	(Brazil) Luiz da Silva (1/1)	(Brazil) Helder Junior (1/1)	(Brazil) Pedro Lucas (2/2)

== Brazilian National Champions in Women's Brazilian Jiu Jitsu by Year and Weight ==
Year	-48 kg Rooster/Galo	-53 kg Light Feather/Pluma	-58 kg Feather/Pena	-64 kg Light/Leve	-69 kg Middle/Médio	-74 kg Medium Heavy/Meio-Pesado	-80 kg Heavy/Pesado	+80/84 kg Super Heavy/Super Pesado	N/A kg Ultra Heavy / Psdisimo	Absolute
1998			(Brazil) Patrícia Lage (1/2)							(Brazil) Patrícia Lage (2/2)
2000			(Brazil) Janaina Ventura (1/4)							(Brazil) Janaina Ventura (2/4)
2001							(Brazil) Maria de Fátima (1/1)			(Brazil) Maria de Fátima (1/1)
2002			(Brazil) Bianca Barreto (1/13)	(Brazil) Janaina Ventura (3/4)		(Brazil) Carla Hipolito (1/1)				(Brazil) Janaina Ventura (4/4)
2003			(Brazil) Bianca Barreto (2/13)	(Brazil) Ana Paula Ferraz (1/1)	(Brazil) Mariana Azevedo (1/2)		(Brazil) Erika Paes (1/1)			(Brazil) Mariana Azevedo (2/2)
2004			(Brazil) Bianca Barreto (3/13)	(Brazil) Hannette Quadros (1/1)						(Brazil) Mariana Coelho (1/1)
2005			(Brazil) Bianca Barreto (4/13)		(Brazil) Polyana Lago (1/1)		(Brazil) Luzia Fernandes (1/9)			(Brazil) Bianca Barreto(5/13)
2006		(Brazil) Elizangela Meirelis (1/2)	(Brazil) Bianca Barreto (6/13)	(Brazil) Juliana Gonçalves (1/1)						(Brazil) Bianca Barreto(7/13)
2007		(Brazil) Elizangela Meirelis (2/2)	(Brazil) Bianca Barreto (8/13)	(Brazil) Rosalind Ferreira (1/1)	(Brazil) Gilda Maria (1/1)	(Brazil) Marcela Caiafa (1/1)	(Brazil) Luana Gomes(1/1)			(Brazil) Bianca Barreto(9/13)
2008	(Brazil) Hellen Kenupp (1/1)	(Brazil) Mirian Cardoso (1/1)	(Brazil) Bianca Barreto (10/13)	(Brazil) Kyra Gracie (1/1)	(Brazil) Tânia Andrade (1/1)	(Brazil) Diana Menezes (1/4)	(Brazil) Maria Paixão(1/7)		(Brazil) Luzia Fernandes(2/9)	(Brazil) Luzia Fernandes(3/9)
2009			(Brazil) Bianca Barreto (11/13)	(Brazil) Luana Alzuguir (1/4)	(Brazil) Silvana Abreu (1/2)	(Brazil) Caroline de Lazer (1/1)	(Brazil) Diana Menezes(2/4)		(Brazil) Luzia Fernandes(4/9)	(Brazil) Diana Menezes(3/4)
2010	(Brazil) Thaizar Albuquerque (1/1)	(Brazil) Elisangela Fernandes (2/2)	(Brazil) Bianca Barreto (12/13)	(Brazil) Barbara Dos Santos (1/2)	(Brazil) Luana Alzuiguir (2/4)	(Brazil) Fernanda Mazzelli (1/7)			(Brazil) Luzia Fernandes(5/9)	(Brazil) Luzia Fernandes(6/9)
2011			(Brazil) Marina Medeiros (1/1)	(Brazil) Michelle Nicolini (1/3)	(Brazil) Luiza Monteiro (1/7)	(Brazil) Silvana Abreu (2/2)		(Brazil) Bianca Barreto(13/13)	(Brazil) Luzia Fernandes(7/9)	(Brazil) Luiza Monteiro(2/7)
2012		(Brazil) Bruna Nascimento (1/1)	(Brazil) Marina Ribeiro (1/1)	(Brazil) Luiza Monteiro (3/7)		(Brazil) Fernanda Mazzelli (2/7)	(Brazil) Talita Nogueira(1/6)	(Brazil) Luzia Fernandes(8/9)		(Brazil) Michelle Nicolini(2/3)
2013		(Brazil) Angelica Ferreira (1/1)		(Brazil) Luiza Monteiro (4/7)	(Brazil) Luana Alzuguir (3/4)	(Brazil) Diana Menezes (4/4)	(Brazil) Fernanda Mazzelli (3/7)	(Brazil) Luzia Fernandes (9/9)	(Brazil) Maria Teixeira(1/1)	(Brazil) Luana Alzuguir(4/4)
2014			(United States) Mackenzie Dern (1/2)	(Brazil) Nádia de Melo (1/1)	(Brazil) Barbara Dos Santos (2/2)		(Brazil) Andresa Correa (1/4)	(Brazil) Fernanda Mazzelli (4/7)	(Brazil) Talita Nogueira (2/6)	(Brazil) Talita Nogueira(3/6)
2015			(United States) Mackenzie Dern (2/2)	(Brazil) Luiza Monteiro (5/7)	(Brazil) Monique Elias (1/2)	(Brazil) Andresa Correa (2/4)	(Brazil) Fernanda Mazzelli (5/7)	(Brazil) Talita Nogueira(4/6)	(Brazil) Joaquina Bonfim (1/1)	(Brazil) Monique Elias(2/2)
2016		(Brazil) Rayanne Dos Santos (1/1)	(Brazil) Michelle Nicolini (3/3)		(Brazil) Luiza Monteiro (6/7)	(Brazil) Andresa Correa (3/4)	(Brazil) Samela Shoham (1/1)	(Brazil) Fabiana Santos (1/1)	(Brazil) Talita Nogueira (5/6)	(Brazil) Andresa Correa(4/4)
2017		(Brazil) Thamires Aquino (1/1)	(Brazil) Andressa de Souza (2/2)	(Brazil) Beatriz Mesquita (1/3)	(Brazil) Nivia Moura (1/1)	(Brazil) Carina Santi(1/3)	(Brazil) Claudia Doval (1/2)	(Brazil) Talita Nogueira(6/6)	(Brazil) Tayane Porfírio (1/4)	(Brazil) Tayane Porfírio(2/4)
2018	(Brazil) Liliane Lima (1/1)	(Brazil) Alliny Santos (1/1)		(Brazil) Bianca Basilio (1/4)	(Brazil) Ericka Almeida (1/2)	(Brazil) Carina Santi (2/3)	(Brazil) Claudia Doval (2/2)	(Brazil) Jéssica Flowers (1/2)	(Brazil) Tayane Porfírio (3/4)	(Brazil) Tayane Porfírio (4/4)
2019		(Brazil) Dyna Rodrigues (1/1)	(United Kingdom) Ffion Davies (1/1)	(Brazil) Bianca Basilio (2/4)	(Brazil) Beatriz Mesquita (2/3)	(Brazil) Rafaela Maria Pires (1/1)	(Brazil) Fernanda Mazzelli (6/7)	(Brazil) Carina Santi (3/3)	(Brazil) Jéssica Flowers (2/2)	(Brazil) Beatriz Mesquita (3/3)
2021	(Brazil) Mariana Rolszt (1/1)	(Brazil) Ana Rodrigues (1/1)	(Brazil) Bianca Basílio (3/4)	(Brazil) Luciane Silva (1/1)	(Brazil) Éricka Almeida (2/2)	(Brazil) Sábatha Laís (1/3)	(Brazil) Graciele Del Fava (1/1)	(Brazil) Yara Soares (1/1)		(Brazil) Gabrieli Pessanha (1/7)
2022	(Brazil) Maysa Bastos (1/3)	(Brazil) Brenda Larissa (1/2)	(Brazil) Bianca Basílio (4/5)	(Brazil) Nathalie Ribeiro (1/1)	(Brazil) Andressa Cintra (1/2)	(Brazil) Sábatha Laís (2/3)	(Brazil) Fernanda Mazzelli (7/7)	(Brazil) Gabrieli Pessanha (2/7)		(Brazil) Gabrieli Pessanha (3/7)
2023	(Brazil) Brenda Larissa (2/2)	(Brazil) Mayssa Bastos (2/3)	(Brazil) Bianca Basílio (5/5)	(Brazil) Luiza Monteiro (7/7)	(Brazil) Andressa Cintra (2/2)	(Poland) Maria Malyjasiak (1/1)	(Brazil) Tamiris Silva (1/1)	(Brazil) Gabrieli Pessanha (4/7)		(Brazil) Gabrieli Pessanha (5/7)
2024	(United States) Shelby Murphey (1/1)	(Brazil) Mayssa Bastos (3/3)	(Brazil) Maria Luiza (1/1)	(Brazil) Vitória Vieira (1/1)	(Brazil) Thalyta Silva (1/1)	(Brazil) Sábatha Laís (3/3)	(Brazil) Melissa Cueto (1/1)	(Brazil) Gabrieli Pessanha (6/7)		(Brazil) Gabrieli Pessanha (7/7)

== See also ==
- IBJJF
- World Championship
- World No-Gi Championship
- Pan Jiu-Jitsu Championship
- Pan Jiu-Jitsu No-Gi Championship
- European Open Championship
- European Open Nogi Championship
- Brazilian Nationals Jiu-Jitsu No-Gi Championship
- Asian Open Championship
- Abu Dhabi Combat Club Submission Wrestling World Championship
