= The Man Who Saw Seconds =

2024 novel by Alexander Boldizar

- First edition cover
- Author: Alexander Boldizar
- Language: English
- Genre: Science fiction, thriller, satire
- Publisher: CLASH Books
- Publication date: May 2024
- Publication place: United States
- Media type: Print (paperback), e-book, audiobook
- Awards: Locus Award for Best Science Fiction Novel (2025)
- ISBN: 978-1-960988-07-2

The Man Who Saw Seconds is a 2024 science fiction thriller novel by the Slovak-Canadian writer Alexander Boldizar, published by CLASH Books. It won the 2025 Locus Award for Best Science Fiction Novel.

== Plot ==
Preble Jefferson, a New Yorker, can see five seconds into the future. He keeps the ability private, supporting his wife and their young son by gambling, until a confrontation with a police officer on the subway ends in a shooting. Government agencies learn what he can do and begin a manhunt, and as it escalates their interest shifts from law enforcement to the military uses of his ability. Jefferson has to decide how far he will go to protect his family.

== Background ==
Boldizar, a lawyer and art critic born in Košice, had previously published the satirical novel The Ugly (2016). Discussing the novel with Locus in 2025, he described its central argument as the tendency of institutions to end up working against the purposes for which they were created, and its emotional core as the relationship between Jefferson and his young son.

== Publication ==
CLASH Books published the novel in paperback and e-book in May 2024. An unabridged audiobook read by Christian Leatherman was released by Simon & Schuster Audio in 2025.

== Reception ==
Reviewers treated the book as a genre hybrid. In the Vancouver Sun, Tom Sandborn called it "a book of cinematic velocity and frequent, dark satiric impact" and "a mash-up of some of the best elements of the thriller, the novel of ideas, anarchism, philosophy and quantum theory". Tim Pratt included it among his ten favorite books of 2024, describing it as "one of the more audacious and emotionally brutal thrillers I've ever read" and singling out the father-son relationship at its center: "This one hit me hard in the dadfeels."

Reviewing the novel for Locus, Alexandra Pierce discussed its ambiguity about genre: "I've no doubt there will be some parts of the 'literary' establishment who want to keep The Man Who Saw Seconds from being tagged as science fiction, largely because it's set in the now. But I hope this can be genre-spanning, and that it gets the attention it deserves from every awards list, science fiction and not."

== Awards ==
The novel won the 2025 Locus Award for Best Science Fiction Novel, announced on June 21, 2025; the other finalists included The Mercy of Gods by James S. A. Corey, Absolution by Jeff VanderMeer and The Bezzle by Cory Doctorow. It was also a finalist for the 2024 Foreword INDIES Book of the Year Award in the thriller and suspense category.

The novel was also included on Locus's Recommended Reading List for 2024.
