= Rio International Open Jiu-Jitsu Championship =

Brazilian Jiu-Jitsu competitions

The Rio International Open Jiu-Jitsu Championship was a Jujutsu/Brazilian Jiu-Jitsu tournament held at the Tijuca Tênis Clube, in Rio de Janeiro since 2008. This championship occurs simultaneously to Master and seniors international jiu-jitsu championship.

== Categories ==
Source: Belts: White, Blue, Purple, Brown, Black, - Male and female. The age is evaluated as the one the athlete completes in the year of the contest.

- Juvenile: 16 to 17 years old
- Adult: 18 to 29 years old

== Results ==
=== Available information ===
Since 2008, CBJJ has broadcast the general result by teams.

=== 2008 ===
- 1- Alliance
- 2- Check Matt
- 3- UGF

=== 2009 ===
- 1- Alliance
- 2- Checkmat BJJ
- 3- GFTeam

=== 2010 ===
- 1- Gracie Barra
- 2- Nova União
- 3- Gracie Humaita

=== 2011 ===
- 1 - GFTeam
- 2 - Nova União
- 3 - Gracie Humaitá
