= Hrabal =

Hrabal (feminine: Hrabalová) is a surname. Notable people with the surname include:

- Bohumil Hrabal (1914–1997), Czech writer
- Michael Hrabal (born 2005), Czech ice hockey player
- Jaroslav Hrabal (born 1974), Slovak retired footballer
- Josef Hrabal (born 1985), Czech ice hockey player

== See also ==
- 4112 Hrabal, a minor planet
