= 2006 World Jiu-Jitsu Championship =

Brazilian Jiu-Jitsu competitions

The 2006 World Jiu-Jitsu Championship was held at Tijuca Tênis Clube, Rio de Janeiro, Brazil.

== Results ==
=== Academy Results ===
	Juvenile	Female	Adult
1º	Bonsai	Gracie Barra	Brasa
2º	Carlson Gracie UGF	Brazilian Top Team	Gracie Barra
3º	Infight	Gracie Humaitá	Gracie Humaitá
