= Luiza Monteiro =

Brazilian jiu-jitsu practitioner from Brazil

- Born: Luiza Monteiro Moura da Costa; November 23, 1988 (age 37); Salvador, Bahia, Brazil
- Style: Brazilian jiu-jitsu
- Team: Atos Jiu-Jitsu; New School Brotherhood; Checkmat; Cicero Costha (PSLPB)
- Rank: 2nd deg. BJJ black belt

Other information
- Occupation: BJJ instructor

Luiza Monteiro (born 23 November 1988) is a Brazilian submission grappler and 2nd degree black belt Brazilian jiu-jitsu competitor. She has won gold medals in the Gi at all four major events and in no-gi at three of the four major events.

== Biography ==
Luiza Monteiro was born on 23 November 1988, in Salvador, Bahia, Brazil. Her family moved to Niterói when she was a baby. Monteiro began training around 13 years old and passed through various schools before receiving her Black Belt in 2010 from Rodrigo Cavaca.

At the beginning of 2018 Luiza joined the Atos Jiu-Jitsu Team in San Diego California where she now trains alongside competitors such as Andre Galvao, Kaynan Duarte and Lucas Barbosa.

== Competitive career ==
On March 26, 2023, Monteiro won a gold medal in the lightweight division of the IBJJF Pan Championship 2023. She then competed in the Campeonato Brasileiro de Jiu-Jitsu on May 7, 2023 and won gold in the lightweight division.

Monteiro competed in a superfight against Nathalie Ribeiro at ADXC 1 on October 20, 2023. She won the match by unanimous decision.

Monteiro was invited to compete in the women's lightweight division of The Crown on November 19, 2023 along with Brianna Ste-Marie, Janaina Lebre, and Nathalie Ribeiro. She beat both opponents and won the tournament.

Monteiro competed against Elisabeth Clay at UFC Fight Pass Invitational 5 on December 10, 2023. She lost the match by submission.

Monteiro competed against Julia Alves in a superfight at BJJ Stars 12 on April 27, 2024. She lost the match on points.

Monteiro won a gold medal in the lightweight division at the IBJJF World Championship 2024, then announced her retirement from the tournament immediately afterward.

Monteiro was due to compete in the lightweight division at the second edition of The Crown on November 17, 2024, but she withdrew due to undisclosed reasons. She then won a silver medal in the lightweight division of the IBJJF Pan Championship 2025.

== Competitive style ==
Luiza is known for her leglocks, footlocks and toeholds finishing three opponents during her Gold medal winning campaign at the 2016 Euros. She also finished her Semi-final opponent at the San Francisco open 2018 with a toehold.

== Competitive summary ==
Main Achievements (Black Belt)

- IBJJF World Champion (2015 / 2017)
- IBJJF World Champion No-Gi (2012 / 2013 / 2014)
- IBJJF Pan Champion (2011 / 2013 / 2014 / 2016 / 2018 / 2019 / 2020 / 2021)
- IBJJF Pan Champion No-Gi (2014 (Note: Weight and absolute))
- IBJJF Brazilian Nationals Champion (2011 / 2012 / 2013 / 2015 / 2023)
- IBJJF European Open Champion (2019 / 2023)
- IBJJF NYC Pro Champion (2014 (Note: Absolute))
- IBJJF Queen Of Mats winner (2019)
- 2nd place IBJJF Brazilian Nationals (2015)
- 2nd place IBJJF Pan Championship (2015)
- 2nd place IBJJF World Championship (2011 / 2012 / 2014 / 2018 / 2019 / 2021)
- 2nd place IBJJF European Open (2019)
- 2nd place 3CG Kumite 7 Grand Prix (2020)
- 3rd place IBJJF World Championship (2014 / 2012)
- 3rd place IBJJF World Championship No-Gi (2012 / 2013 / 2014)
- 3rd place IBJJF Pan Championship (2011 / 2012 / 2013)
- 3rd place IBJJF Brazilian Nationals (2013)

Main Achievements (Colored Belts):

- 2nd place IBJJF Pan American Championship (2010 brown)
- 3rd place IBJJF World Championship (2010 brown)

== Instructor lineage ==
Carlos Gracie > Carlson Gracie > Élcio Figueiredo > Rodrigo Cavaca > Luiza Monteiro:
