= International Brazilian Jiu-Jitsu Federation =

Grappling competition organizer

- Abbreviation: IBJJF
- Formation: 2002
- Type: Private
- Headquarters: Rio de Janeiro, Brazil
- Region served: Worldwide
- Official language: Portuguese, English
- President: Carlos Gracie, Jr.
- Website: ibjjf.com

The International Brazilian Jiu-Jitsu Federation (IBJJF) is a for-profit company that hosts several of the biggest Brazilian jiu-jitsu tournaments in the world, including the World Jiu-Jitsu Championship, World No-Gi Championship, Pan Jiu-Jitsu Championship, and European Open Jiu-Jitsu Championship.

The company was created by Carlos Gracie, Jr., who is the head of one of the largest Brazilian jiu-jitsu schools, Gracie Barra. The IBJJF uses the ruleset of the Confederação Brasileira de Jiu-Jitsu, which is their sister organization in Brazil.

== IBJJF Gi tournaments ==
Athletes competing in official IBJJF tournaments can gain ranking points which count towards their position in the official IBJJF rankings. In the 2017–2018 points system first place in weight divisions is worth 9 points, second 3 points, and third 1 point. First place in the open class is worth 13.5 points, second 4.5 points, and third 1.5 points.

The IBJJF weight tournaments in terms of their importance in the calendar. The weighting of a tournament is a factor in the calculation of the number of points the athlete can win via their participation. The IBJJF also uses a third criterion for determining ranking points, which is the calendar season the tournament took place. For the 2017/2018 season, ranking points gained at an IBJJF event from 2015/16 were multiplied by 1, 2016/2017 by 2, and 2017/2018 by 3.

Points are calculated as follows:

Number of points x tournament ranking × year weighting

Examples:

2017/2018 World Championship 1st place open division 13.5 for first x 7 tournament ranking x 3 season weighting = 283.5 points 2015/2016 British National 2nd place medium heavy division 3 for second x 1 tournament ranking x 1 season weighting = 3 points

The Gi tournaments in the 2017/2018 season along with their tournament weighting are listed below.

FEDERATION	WEIGHTING	CHAMPIONSHIP	CITY	LOCATION
IBJJF	7	World IBJJF Jiu-Jitsu Championship	Long Beach	The Walter Pyramid
IBJJF	7	World Master IBJJF Jiu-Jitsu Championship	Las Vegas	Las Vegas Convention Center
IBJJF	4	European Jiu-Jitsu IBJJF Championship	Odivelas (Lisbon)	Pavilhão Multiusos de Odivelas
IBJJF	4	Pan Jiu-Jitsu IBJJF Championship	Irvine	Bren Center – UCI
IBJJF	3	Asian Jiu-Jitsu IBJJF Championship	Tokyo	Tokyo Budo-Kan
CBJJ	3	Brazilian National Jiu-Jitsu Championship	Barueri	Ginásio José Correa
IBJJF	2	American National IBJJF Jiu-Jitsu Championship	Las Vegas	Sports Center of Las Vegas
IBJJF	2	Pan Pacific Jiu-Jitsu IBJJF Championship	Melbourne	Melbourne Sports and Aquatics Center
IBJJF	2	Rio BJJ Pro IBJJF Championship	Rio de Janeiro	Tijuca Tenis Club
IBJJF	2	São Paulo BJJ Pro IBJJF Championship	Barueri	Ginásio José Correa
IBJJF	2	South American Jiu-Jitsu Championship	Barueri	Ginásio José Correa
IBJJF	1	Atlanta Spring International Open IBJJF Jiu-Jitsu Championship	Atlanta	Georgia International Convention Center
IBJJF	1	Atlanta Summer International Open IBJJF Jiu-Jitsu Championship	Atlanta	Georgia International Convention Center
IBJJF	1	Atlanta Winter International Open IBJJF Jiu-Jitsu Championship	Atlanta	Georgia International Convention Center
IBJJF	1	Austin International Open IBJJF Jiu-Jitsu Championship	Round Rock	Round Rock Sports Center
IBJJF	1	Belo Horizonte Open IBJJF Jiu-Jitsu Championship	Belo Horizonte	Estadio Jornalista Felipe Drummond
IBJJF	1	Belo Horizonte Winter International Open IBJJF Jiu-Jitsu Championship	Belo Horizonte	Estadio Jornalista Felipe Drummond
IBJJF	1	Boston Spring International Open IBJJF Jiu-Jitsu Championship	Boston	UMASS Athletics
IBJJF	1	Boston Summer International Open IBJJF Jiu-Jitsu Championship	Boston	UMASS Athletics
IBJJF	1	Brasilia International Open IBJJF Jiu-Jitsu Championship	Brasilia	Ginásio do Cruzeiro
IBJJF	1	British National IBJJF Jiu-Jitsu Championship	London	Crystal Palace
IBJJF	1	Charlotte International Open IBJJF Jiu-Jitsu Championship	Concord	Cabarrus Arena
IBJJF	1	Chicago Spring International Open IBJJF Jiu-Jitsu Championship	Chicago	Chicago State University
IBJJF	1	Chicago Summer International Open IBJJF Jiu-Jitsu Championship	Chicago	Chicago State University
IBJJF	1	Cincinnati International Open IBJJF Jiu-Jitsu Championship	Cincinnati	Mount St. Joseph University
IBJJF	1	Copenhagen International Open IBJJF Jiu-Jitsu Championship	Birkerød	Birkerød Idrætscenter
IBJJF	1	Curitiba Fall International Open IBJJF Jiu-Jitsu Championship	Curitiba	Ginásio da Universidade Positivo
IBJJF	1	Curitiba Winter International Open IBJJF Jiu-Jitsu Championship	Curitiba	Ginásio da Universidade Positivo
IBJJF	1	Dallas Fall International Open IBJJF Jiu-Jitsu Championship	Dallas	Texas Woman University
IBJJF	1	Dallas Spring International Open IBJJF Jiu-Jitsu Championship	Dallas	Texas Woman University
IBJJF	1	Floripa Fall Open IBJJF Jiu-Jitsu Championship	Florianópolis	Instituto Estadual de Educação de Florianópolis
IBJJF	1	Floripa Spring International Open IBJJF Jiu-Jitsu Championship	Florianoópolis	Instituto Estadual de Educação de Florianópolis
IBJJF	1	German National IBJJF Jiu-Jitsu Championship	Berlin	Sporthalle Haemmerlingstrasse
IBJJF	1	Houston International Open IBJJF Jiu-Jitsu Championship	Houston	University of St. Thomas
IBJJF	1	Japanese National IBJJF Jiu-Jitsu Championship	Tokyo	Sumida City Gymnasium
IBJJF	1	Las Vegas International Open IBJJF Jiu-Jitsu Championship	Las Vegas	Sports Center of Las Vegas
IBJJF	1	London Fall International Open IBJJF Jiu-Jitsu Championship	London	Crystal Palace
IBJJF	1	London Winter International Open IBJJF Jiu-Jitsu Championship	London	Crystal Palace
IBJJF	1	Long Beach International Open IBJJF Jiu-Jitsu Championship	Long Beach	The Walter Pyramid
IBJJF	1	Madrid International Open IBJJF Jiu-Jitsu Championship	Madrid	Pabellón Deportivo Europa
IBJJF	1	Manaus International Open IBJJF Jiu-Jitsu Championship	Manaus	Arena Poliesportiva Amadeu Teixeira
IBJJF	1	Manila International Open IBJJF Jiu-Jitsu Championship	Manila	SM Mall of Asia
IBJJF	1	Melbourne International Open IBJJF Jiu-Jitsu Championship	Melbourne	Melbourne Sports and Aquatics Centre
IBJJF	1	Mexico City International Open IBJJF Jiu-Jitsu Championship	Mexico City	Centro Nacional de Alto Rendimiento
IBJJF	1	Mexico City Summer International Open IBJJF Jiu-Jitsu Championship	Mexico City	Ciudad Deportiva
IBJJF	1	Miami Fall International Open IBJJF Jiu-Jitsu Championship	Miami	Miami Dade College
IBJJF	1	Miami Spring International Open IBJJF Jiu-Jitsu Championship	Miami	Florida international University
IBJJF	1	Moscow International Open IBJJF Jiu-Jitsu Championship	Moscow	Sports Complex “Festivalniy”
IBJJF	1	Munich International Open IBJJF Jiu-Jitsu Championship	Unterhaching	TSV Unterhaching – Sportarena
IBJJF	1	New York BJJ Pro IBJJF Championship	New York	CCNY
IBJJF	1	New York Spring International Open IBJJF Jiu-Jitsu Championship	New York	CCNY
IBJJF	1	New York Summer International Open IBJJF Jiu-Jitsu Championship	New York	CCNY
IBJJF	1	Paris International Open IBJJF Jiu-Jitsu Championship	Paris	Salle Charpy – Stade Charléty
IBJJF	1	Poznań International Open IBJJF Jiu-Jitsu Championship	Poznań	LOSiR Sp
IBJJF	1	Rio Fall International Open IBJJF Jiu-Jitsu Championship	Rio de Janeiro	Tijuca Tênis Club*
IBJJF	1	Rio Winter International Open IBJJF Jiu-Jitsu Championship	Rio de Janeiro	Tijuca Tênis Club*
IBJJF	1	Rome International Open IBJJF Jiu-Jitsu Championship	Rome	PalaPellicone
IBJJF	1	Salvador Fall International Open IBJJF Jiu-Jitsu Championship	Salvador	Ginásio Poliesportivo de Cajazeiras
IBJJF	1	Salvador Spring International Open IBJJF Jiu-Jitsu Championship	Salvador	Ginásio Poliesportivo de Cajazeiras
IBJJF	1	San Antonio International Open IBJJF Jiu-Jitsu Championship	San Antonio	St. Mary's University
IBJJF	1	San Diego BJJ Pro IBJJF Championship	San Diego	Point Loma Nazarene University
IBJJF	1	San Diego International Open IBJJF Jiu-Jitsu Championship	San Diego	Point Loma Nazarene University
IBJJF	1	San Jose International Open IBJJF Jiu-Jitsu Championship	San Jose (CA)	San Jose City College
IBJJF	1	San Jose Summer International Open IBJJF Jiu-Jitsu Championship	San Jose	San Jose Convention Center
IBJJF	1	São Paulo International Open IBJJF Jiu-Jitsu Championship	Barueri	Ginásio José Correa
IBJJF	1	Seattle International Open IBJJF Jiu-Jitsu Championship	Seattle	Everett Community College
IBJJF	1	Spanish National IBJJF Jiu-Jitsu Championship	Guadalajara (ES)	Polideportivo David Santamaria
IBJJF	1	Sydney International Open IBJJF Jiu-Jitsu Championship	Sydney	University Sports & Aquatic Centre
IBJJF	1	Vitória International Open IBJJF Jiu-Jitsu Championship	Vitória	Centro Esportivo Tancredo de Almeida Neves
IBJJF	1	Washington DC International Open IBJJF Jiu-Jitsu Championship	Hyattsville	Prince George's Sport & Learning Complex
IBJJF	1	Zurich International Open IBJJF Jiu-Jitsu Championship	Wädenswil	Sporthalle Glärnisch

== IBJJF No-Gi Tournaments ==
As of December 2017, the IBJJF does not have a separate athlete ranking for No-Gi tournaments although states on its ranking page that "No-GI ranking and system coming soon". The No-Gi events in the 2017/2018 calendar are listed below.

FEDERATION	TYPE	CHAMPIONSHIP	CITY	LOCATION
IBJJF	NO GI	World No-Gi Championship	Anaheim	Anaheim Convention
IBJJF	NO GI	Pan Jiu-Jitsu No-Gi Championship	New York	CCNY
IBJJF	NO GI	European Nogi Brazilian Jiu Jitsu Championship	Rome	PalaPellicone
CBJJ	NO GI	Brazilian Nationals Jiu-Jitsu No-Gi Championship	Rio de Janeiro	Tijuca Tenis Club
IBJJF	NO GI	American National IBJJF Jiu-Jitsu No-Gi Championship	Las Vegas	Sports Center of Las Vegas
IBJJF	NO GI	Atlanta Summer International Open IBJJF Jiu-Jitsu No-Gi Championship	Atlanta	Georgia International Convention Center
IBJJF	NO GI	Austin International Open IBJJF Jiu-Jitsu No-Gi Championship	Round Rock	Round Rock Sports Center
IBJJF	NO GI	Belo Horizonte Open IBJJF Jiu-Jitsu No-Gi Championship	Belo Horizonte	Estadio Jornalista Felipe Drummond
IBJJF	NO GI	Belo Horizonte Winter International Open IBJJF Jiu-Jitsu No-Gi Championship	Belo Horizonte	Estadio Jornalista Felipe Drummond
IBJJF	NO GI	Brasilia International Open IBJJF Jiu-Jitsu No-Gi Championship	Brasilia	Ginásio do Cruzeiro
IBJJF	NO GI	British National IBJJF Jiu-Jitsu No-Gi Championship	London	Crystal Palace
IBJJF	NO GI	Chicago Spring International Open IBJJF Jiu-Jitsu No-Gi Championship	Chicago	Chicago State University
IBJJF	NO GI	Chicago Summer International Open IBJJF Jiu-Jitsu No-Gi Championship	Chicago	Chicago State University
IBJJF	NO GI	Copenhagen International Open IBJJF Jiu-Jitsu No-Gi Championship	Birkerød	Birkerød Idrætscenter
IBJJF	NO GI	Curitiba Fall International Open IBJJF Jiu-Jitsu No-Gi Championship	Curitiba	Ginásio da Universidade Positivo
IBJJF	NO GI	Curitiba Winter International Open IBJJF Jiu-Jitsu No-Gi Championship	Curitiba	Ginásio da Universidade Positivo
IBJJF	NO GI	Dallas Fall International Open IBJJF Jiu-Jitsu No-Gi Championship	Dallas	Texas Woman University
IBJJF	NO GI	Dallas Fall International Open IBJJF Jiu-Jitsu No-Gi Championship	Dallas	Texas Woman University
IBJJF	NO GI	Dallas Spring International Open IBJJF Jiu-Jitsu No-Gi Championship	Dallas	Texas Woman University
IBJJF	NO GI	Floripa Fall Open IBJJF Jiu-Jitsu No-Gi Championship	Florianópolis	Instituto Estadual de Educação de Florianópolis
IBJJF	NO GI	Floripa Spring International Open IBJJF Jiu-Jitsu No-Gi Championship	Florianoópolis	Instituto Estadual de Educação de Florianópolis
IBJJF	NO GI	German National IBJJF Jiu-Jitsu No-Gi Championship	Berlin	Sporthalle Haemmerlingstrasse
IBJJF	NO GI	London Fall International Open IBJJF Jiu-Jitsu No-Gi Championship	London	Crystal Palace
IBJJF	NO GI	Madrid International Open IBJJF Jiu-Jitsu No-Gi Championship	Madrid	Pabellón Deportivo Europa
IBJJF	NO GI	Manaus International Open IBJJF Jiu-Jitsu No-Gi Championship	Manaus	Arena Poliesportiva Amadeu Teixeira
IBJJF	NO GI	Manila International Open IBJJF Jiu-Jitsu No-Gi Championship	Manila	SM Mall of Asia
IBJJF	NO GI	Melbourne International Open IBJJF Jiu-Jitsu No-Gi Championship	Melbourne	Melbourne Sports and Aquatics Centre
IBJJF	NO GI	Mexico City International Open IBJJF Jiu-Jitsu No-Gi Championship	Mexico City	Centro Nacional de Alto Rendimiento
IBJJF	NO GI	Mexico City Summer International Open IBJJF Jiu-Jitsu No-Gi Championship	Mexico City	Ciudad Deportiva
IBJJF	NO GI	Miami Spring International Open IBJJF Jiu-Jitsu No-Gi Championship	Miami	Florida International University
IBJJF	NO GI	Moscow International Open IBJJF Jiu-Jitsu No-Gi Championship	Moscow	Sports Complex “Festival”
IBJJF	NO GI	Munich International Open IBJJF Jiu-Jitsu No-Gi Championship	Unterhaching	TSV Unterhaching – Sportarena
IBJJF	NO GI	New York Spring International Open IBJJF Jiu-Jitsu No-Gi Championship	New York	CCNY
IBJJF	NO GI	New York Summer International Open IBJJF Jiu-Jitsu No-Gi Championship	New York	CCNY
IBJJF	NO GI	Pan Pacific Jiu-Jitsu No-Gi IBJJF Championship	Melbourne	Melbourne Sports and Aquatics Center
IBJJF	NO GI	Paris International Open IBJJF Jiu-Jitsu No-Gi Championship	Paris	Salle Charpy – Stade Charléty
IBJJF	NO GI	Poznań International Open IBJJF Jiu-Jitsu No-Gi Championship	Poznań	LOSiR Sp
IBJJF	NO GI	Rio Fall International Open IBJJF Jiu-Jitsu No-Gi Championship	Rio de Janeiro	Tijuca Tênis Club*
IBJJF	NO GI	Salvador Fall International Open IBJJF Jiu-Jitsu No-Gi Championship	Salvador	Ginásio Poliesportivo de Cajazeiras
IBJJF	NO GI	Salvador Spring International Open IBJJF Jiu-Jitsu No-Gi Championship	Salvador	Ginásio Poliesportivo de Cajazeiras
IBJJF	NO GI	San Jose International Open IBJJF Jiu-Jitsu No-Gi Championship	San Jose (CA)	San Jose City College
IBJJF	NO GI	São Paulo International Open IBJJF Jiu-Jitsu No-Gi Championship	Barueri	Ginásio José Correa
IBJJF	NO GI	Spanish National IBJJF Jiu-Jitsu No-Gi Championship	Guadalajara (ES)	Polideportivo David Santamaria
IBJJF	NO GI	Sydney International Open IBJJF Jiu-Jitsu No-Gi Championship	Sydney	University Sports & Aquatic Centre
IBJJF	NO GI	Vitória International Open IBJJF Jiu-Jitsu No-Gi Championship	Vitória	Centro Esportivo Tancredo de Almeida Neves
IBJJF	NO GI	Zurich International Open IBJJF Jiu-Jitsu No-Gi Championship	Wädenswil	Sporthalle Glärnisch

== IBJJF special events ==
Alongside their open tournaments, the IBJJF has also staged a number of special events over the years as well. This originally began with the introduction of the IBJJF Grand Prix, an invitation-only tournament that took place on a single night and was only contested in either one or two weightclasses at each event. In 2022, the IBJJF announced that they would be opening up IBJJF Grand Prix events to women as well, and arranged their first ever female tournament.

On March 20, 2023, the IBJJF announced a new tournament format called 'The Crown' which was scheduled for later that year.

== See also ==
- IBJJF weight classes
