= Master and seniors international jiu-jitsu championship =

Brazilian Jiu-Jitsu competitions

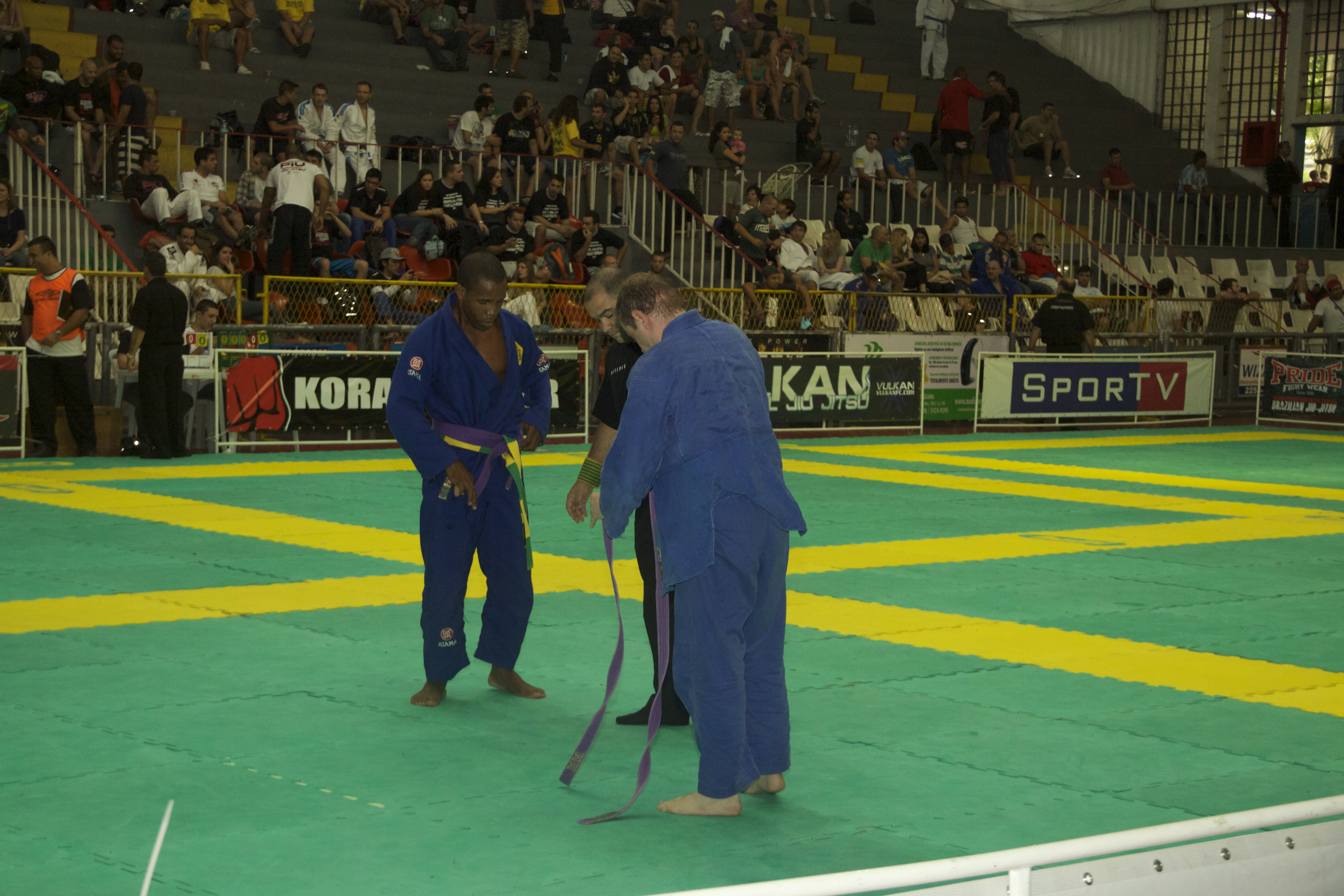
Fighters before the beginning of the combat in Masters and Seniors Championship

The Master international jiu-jitsu championship (Brazilian Portuguese: Campeonato Internacional de Master & Seniors) is a contest realized annually since 1996, in Tijuca Tênis Clube, in Rio de Janeiro. The event is open to all society. According to CBJJ, "the main goal is to stimulate elder athletes, in a specific contest, restoring the image of this sport which, when well taught, is very valuable in education, graduating men with moral characters".

== Categories ==
Belts: Blue, Purple, Brown, Black, - Male and female. The age is evaluated as the one the athlete completes in the year of the contest.

- Master 1: 30 to 35 years old
- Master 2 : 36 to 40 years old
- Master 3 : 41 to 45 years old
- Master 4 : 46 to 50 years old
- Master 5 : 51 to 55 years old
- Master 6 : 56 years old and elder.

== Results ==
=== Available information ===
Since 2004, CBJJ has broadcast the general result by teams.

=== 2004 ===
- 1° - Gracie Humaitá
- 2° - Alliance - EOFC Integração
- 3° - Gracie Barra

=== 2005 ===
- 1° - Brasa
- 2° - Brazilian Top Team
- 3° - Gracie Humaitá

=== 2006 ===
- 1° - Gracie Humaitá
- 2° - Carlson Gracie
- 3° - Gracie Barra

=== 2007 ===
- 1° - Gracie Humaitá
- 2° - Brasa
- 3° - UGF

=== 2008 ===
- 1- Gracie Humaita
- 2- Alliance
- 3- Brazilian Top Team

=== 2009 ===
- 1- Gracie Barra
- 2- Gracie Humaitá
- 3- Brazilian Top Team

=== 2010 ===
- 1- Gracie Humaita
- 2- Gracie Barra
- 3- Nova União

=== 2011 ===
- 1 - Gracie Humaitá
- 2 - Nova União
- 3 - Gracie Barra

== See also ==
- Brazilian Jiu-Jitsu
- Martial arts
