= Craig Jones Invitational =

Grappling competitions

Competition details
- Discipline: Submission grappling
- Type: Yearly
- Organiser: Craig Jones

Divisions
- Current weight divisions: Men: +80 kg; -80 kg; Women: Openweight

History
- First winner: Nick Rodriguez (over 80kg); Kade Ruotolo (under 80kg); Helena Crevar (openweight)

The Craig Jones Invitational (CJI) is an international submission grappling tournament organized by Craig Jones.

The inaugural tournament was held August 16–17, 2024 at the Thomas & Mack Center in Las Vegas, Nevada in the United States. The event was streamed live on YouTube for free. Craig Jones defeated Gabi Garcia in an intergender superfight, Nick Rodriguez won the 80kg+ division tournament, and Kade Ruotolo won the −80kg division tournament. The tournament winners in each weight division received $1 million prize money.

The Craig Jones Invitational 2 (CJI 2) was held August 30–31, 2025, returning to the Thomas & Mack Center in Las Vegas. CJI 2 featured a $1 million team-based grappling tournament won by The B-Team, an openweight $100,000 women's tournament won by Helena Crevar, and a non-tournament superfight which saw Craig Jones defeat Chael Sonnen. The B-Team and Team New Wave initially fought to a draw in the team tournament final before The B-Team were declared the winners by decision; after controversy over the decision, both teams were to be awarded $1 million but Team New Wave were ultimately not given the prize money.

== 2024 ==
=== Background ===
Craig Jones from B-Team Jiu-Jitsu is a two-time ADCC silver medalist. Disappointed with athlete pay at ADCC, he decided to host a tournament in which all invited athletes receive a higher minimum payout ($10,001) than the male winner of ADCC ($10,000).

The two men's divisions scheduled for the 2024 tournament were under 80kg and over 80kg, and the winner of each bracket was to be awarded $1 million. Each men's division bracket had 16 competitors. Each participant received $10,001 for competing.

On JRE MMA Show No. 157, an episode of Joe Rogan's podcast, Jones brought $1 million in cash to promote the tournament.

A best submission bonus of $50,000 was announced.

The dates and location were selected to overlap with ADCC 2024, which was held August 17–18, 2024 in Las Vegas.

Separate from the men's divisions, Craig Jones was scheduled to face Gabi Garcia in an intergender superfight, and Ffion Davies was scheduled to fight Mackenzie Dern in the women's superfight. A superfight with Mikey Musumeci was also announced, but ultimately did not occur due to a lack of a contractual agreement with Musumeci's planned opponent. Mason Fowler was scheduled to fight in the over 80kg bracket but later withdrew from the competition due to injury.

=== Results ===
==== Over 80kg tournament ====
First Round	Quarterfinals	Semifinals	Final	Winner
(United States) Nick Rodriguez	(United States) Nick Rodriguez	(United States) Nick Rodriguez	(United States) Nick Rodriguez	(United States) Nick Rodriguez
(Brazil) Max Gimenis	(United States) Nick Rodriguez	(United States) Nick Rodriguez	(United States) Nick Rodriguez	(United States) Nick Rodriguez
(United Kingdom) Owen Livesey	(United Kingdom) Owen Livesey	(United States) Nick Rodriguez	(United States) Nick Rodriguez	(United States) Nick Rodriguez
(Brazil) Mahamed Aly	(United Kingdom) Owen Livesey	(United States) Nick Rodriguez	(United States) Nick Rodriguez	(United States) Nick Rodriguez
(United States) Adam Bradley	(United States) Adam Bradley	(United States) Adam Bradley	(United States) Nick Rodriguez	(United States) Nick Rodriguez
(United States) Kyle Boehm	(United States) Adam Bradley	(United States) Adam Bradley	(United States) Nick Rodriguez	(United States) Nick Rodriguez
(United States) Luke Rockhold	(United States) Pat Downey	(United States) Adam Bradley	(United States) Nick Rodriguez	(United States) Nick Rodriguez
(United States) Pat Downey	(United States) Pat Downey	(United States) Adam Bradley	(United States) Nick Rodriguez	(United States) Nick Rodriguez
(Brazil) Victor Hugo	(Australia) Lucas Kanard	(Brazil) Inacio Santos	(Brazil) Fellipe Andrew	(United States) Nick Rodriguez
(Australia) Lucas Kanard	(Australia) Lucas Kanard	(Brazil) Inacio Santos	(Brazil) Fellipe Andrew	(United States) Nick Rodriguez
(Brazil) Inacio Santos	(Brazil) Inacio Santos	(Brazil) Inacio Santos	(Brazil) Fellipe Andrew	(United States) Nick Rodriguez
(Brazil) Pedro Alex	(Brazil) Inacio Santos	(Brazil) Inacio Santos	(Brazil) Fellipe Andrew	(United States) Nick Rodriguez
(United States) Daniel Greg Kerkvliet	(Brazil) Fellipe Andrew	(Brazil) Fellipe Andrew	(Brazil) Fellipe Andrew	(United States) Nick Rodriguez
(Brazil) Fellipe Andrew	(Brazil) Fellipe Andrew	(Brazil) Fellipe Andrew	(Brazil) Fellipe Andrew	(United States) Nick Rodriguez
(Brazil) Joao Gabriel Rocha	(Brazil) Joao Gabriel Rocha	(Brazil) Fellipe Andrew	(Brazil) Fellipe Andrew	(United States) Nick Rodriguez
(United States) William Tackett	(Brazil) Joao Gabriel Rocha	(Brazil) Fellipe Andrew	(Brazil) Fellipe Andrew	(United States) Nick Rodriguez

==== Under 80kg tournament ====
First Round	Quarterfinals	Semifinals	Final	Winner
(United States) Tye Ruotolo	(United States) Tye Ruotolo	(Australia) Levi Jones-Leary	(Australia) Levi Jones-Leary	(United States) Kade Ruotolo
(United States) Jason Nolf	(United States) Tye Ruotolo	(Australia) Levi Jones-Leary	(Australia) Levi Jones-Leary	(United States) Kade Ruotolo
(Ecuador) Roberto Jimenez	(Australia) Levi Jones-Leary	(Australia) Levi Jones-Leary	(Australia) Levi Jones-Leary	(United States) Kade Ruotolo
(Australia) Levi Jones-Leary	(Australia) Levi Jones-Leary	(Australia) Levi Jones-Leary	(Australia) Levi Jones-Leary	(United States) Kade Ruotolo
(Brazil) Lucas ‘Hulk’ Barbosa	(Brazil) Lucas ‘Hulk’ Barbosa	(Brazil) Lucas ‘Hulk’ Barbosa	(Australia) Levi Jones-Leary	(United States) Kade Ruotolo
(Japan) Kenta Iwamoto	(Brazil) Lucas ‘Hulk’ Barbosa	(Brazil) Lucas ‘Hulk’ Barbosa	(Australia) Levi Jones-Leary	(United States) Kade Ruotolo
(South Africa) Jozef Chen	(South Africa) Jozef Chen	(Brazil) Lucas ‘Hulk’ Barbosa	(Australia) Levi Jones-Leary	(United States) Kade Ruotolo
(United States) Andy Varela	(South Africa) Jozef Chen	(Brazil) Lucas ‘Hulk’ Barbosa	(Australia) Levi Jones-Leary	(United States) Kade Ruotolo
(United States) Kade Ruotolo	(United States) Kade Ruotolo	(United States) Kade Ruotolo	(United States) Kade Ruotolo	(United States) Kade Ruotolo
(Brazil) Matheus Diniz	(United States) Kade Ruotolo	(United States) Kade Ruotolo	(United States) Kade Ruotolo	(United States) Kade Ruotolo
(Brazil) Renato Canuto	(Norway) Tommy Langaker	(United States) Kade Ruotolo	(United States) Kade Ruotolo	(United States) Kade Ruotolo
(Norway) Tommy Langaker	(Norway) Tommy Langaker	(United States) Kade Ruotolo	(United States) Kade Ruotolo	(United States) Kade Ruotolo
(Brazil) Magid Hage	(United Kingdom) Eoghan O’Flanagan	(United States) Andrew Tackett	(United States) Kade Ruotolo	(United States) Kade Ruotolo
(United Kingdom) Eoghan O’Flanagan	(United Kingdom) Eoghan O’Flanagan	(United States) Andrew Tackett	(United States) Kade Ruotolo	(United States) Kade Ruotolo
(United States) Andrew Tackett	(United States) Andrew Tackett	(United States) Andrew Tackett	(United States) Kade Ruotolo	(United States) Kade Ruotolo
(United States) Nicky Ryan	(United States) Andrew Tackett	(United States) Andrew Tackett	(United States) Kade Ruotolo	(United States) Kade Ruotolo

==== Superfights ====
- (Wales) Ffion Davies def. (Brazil) Mackenzie Dern
- (Australia) Craig Jones def. (Brazil) Gabi Garcia

=== Reception ===
The event raised $500,000 for Tap Cancer Out charity. The event's free YouTube stream was seen by over 100,000 concurrent viewers on both days of competition.

The Craig Jones Invitational won both the Promotion of the Year and Fight Card of the Year awards at the 2024 Jits Magazine BJJ Awards. Kade Ruotolo vs. Andrew Tackett from the event's −80kg tournament won Jits Magazine's Match of the Year award.

== 2025 ==
=== Background ===
On December 8, 2024, Craig Jones announced a second Craig Jones Invitational tournament to be held in August 2025, with the 2025 tournament adopting a Quintet-inspired team format. The event streamed live for free on the FloGrappling YouTube channel.

The Craig Jones Invitational 2 (CJI 2) was held August 30-31, 2025 at the Thomas & Mack Center in Las Vegas. CJI 2 was a two-day event, featuring an eight team tournament, an openweight women's tournament, and a superfight between Jones and Chael Sonnen (replacing an injured Gable Steveson). A total of 46 athletes were scheduled to compete at the event.

Teams in the $1 million team-based grappling tournament consisted of five grapplers, each representing a different weight class. Eight teams of five athletes competed; participating teams were: Team 10th Planet Jiu Jitsu, The B-Team, Team New Wave, Team Atos, Team Europe, Team Pedigo Submission Fighting, Team Americas, and Team Australasia.

The $100,000 four-woman tournament featured: Helena Crevar (Polaris and WNO Champion), Adele Fornarino (2024 ADCC double gold medalist), Ana Vieira (2024 ADCC Champion, 6x IBJJF World Champ), and Sarah Galvão (2025 IBJJF Grand Slam Winner).

Gable Steveson later claimed that he withdrew from the event not because of an injury but rather because Jones asked him to throw their superfight. Jones denied Steveson's claims, with Jones alleging that Steveson's withdrawal was orchestrated by the UFC as an attempt to interfere with CJI2.

=== Teams ===
==== Coaches ====
- (United States) Team New Wave: John Danaher
- Team Americas: Greg Souders
- (Brazil) Team Atos: André Galvão
- Team Europe: Faris Benlamkadem
- (United States) The B-Team: Nicky Ryan
- (United States) Team Pedigo Submission Fighting: Heath Pedigo
- (United States) Team 10th Planet Jiu Jitsu: Eddie Bravo
- (Australia) Team Australasia: Lachlan Giles

==== Athletes ====
- (United States) Team New Wave
  - (United States) Dorian Olivarez
  - (Brazil) Micael Galvão
  - (Brazil) Vagner Rocha
  - (United States) Giancarlo Bodoni
  - (South Africa) Luke Griffith
- Team Americas
  - (United States) Gavin Corbe
  - (United States) Deandre Corbe
  - (United States) Elijah Dorsey
  - (England) Taylor Pearman
  - (United States) Pat Downey
- (Brazil) Team Atos
  - (Brazil) Diego ‘Pato’ Oliveira
  - (Brazil) Ronaldo Junior
  - (Brazil) Lucas ‘Hulk’ Barbosa
  - (Brazil) Kaynan Duarte
  - (Brazil) Felipe Pena
- Team Europe
  - (England) Owen Jones
  - (Poland) Pawel Jaworski
  - (Colombia) Paul Ardila
  - (Brazil) Charles Negromonte
  - (Poland) Marcin Maciulewicz
- (United States) The B-Team
  - (Canada) Ethan Crelinsten
  - (South Africa) Jozef Chen
  - (United States) Chris Wojcik
  - (United States) Nick Rodriguez
  - (Brazil) Victor Hugo
- (United States) Team Pedigo Submission Fighting
  - (Canada) Max Hanson
  - (Canada) Dante Leon
  - (United States) Jacob Couch
  - (United States) Michael Pixley
  - (United States) Brandon Reed
- (United States) Team 10th Planet Jiu Jitsu
  - (United States) Geo Martinez
  - (United States) Alan Sanchez
  - (United States) PJ Barch
  - (United States) Ryan Aitken
  - (United States) Kyle Boehm
- (Australia) Team Australasia
  - (Brazil) Fabricio Andrey
  - (Japan) Kenta Iwamoto
  - (Australia) Lucas Kanard
  - (Australia) Declan Moody
  - (New Zealand) Belal Etiabari

=== Results ===
==== Team tournament ====
Quarterfinals
(United States) Team New Wave
Team Americas
(Brazil) Team Atos
Team Europe
(United States) The B-Team
(United States) Team Pedigo Submission Fighting
(United States) Team 10th Planet Jiu Jitsu
(Australia) Team Australasia

Semifinals
(United States) Team New Wave
(Brazil) Team Atos
(Australia) Team Australasia
(United States) The B-Team

Final
(United States) Team New Wave
(United States) The B-Team

==== Women's tournament ====
Semifinals
(United States) Helena Crevar
(Australia) Adele Fornarino
(Brazil) Ana Vieira
(United States) Sarah Galvão

Final
(United States) Helena Crevar
(United States) Sarah Galvão

==== Superfight ====
- (Australia) Craig Jones def. (United States) Chael Sonnen

=== Reception ===
Night 1 of the event was criticized for a lack of action, with UFC BJJ athlete Mikey Musumeci dubbing the event's team format "boring".

The Craig Jones Invitational 2 itself won the Fight Card of the Year award at the 2025 Jits Magazine BJJ Awards, while Sarah Galvão vs. Ana Vieira from the event's openweight women's tournament won Jits Magazine's Match of the Year award.
