= JCK =

JCK may refer to:

- JCK MMA, a Chinese mixed martial arts promotion
- Java Compatibility Kit, a Technology Compatibility Kit for Java 6.0
- Julia Creek Airport (IATA airport code), Julia Creek, Queensland, Australia

== See also ==
- CJCK-FM, call sign JCK in region C
- KJCK (disambiguation), call sign JCK in region K
- WJCK (disambiguation), call sign JCK in region W
