= Haisam Rida =

Brazilian jiu-jitsu athlete from Ghana (born 1993)

- Born: 25 July 1993 (age 33); Accra, Ghana
- Nickname: Giraffe
- Division: Heavy (94,30 kg /207.9 lbs)
- Fighting out of: Austin, Texas, U.S.
- Team: B Team Jiu-Jitsu; Detroit Jiu-Jitsu Syndicate; Assembly Jiu-Jitsu; Carpe Diem Academy
- Teacher: Yamada Shigetaka
- Rank: BJJ black belt (Note: under Yuki Ishikawa)

Other information
- Occupation: BJJ instructor

Haisam Rida is a Ghanaian submission grappler and black belt Brazilian jiu-jitsu competitor. A two-time Asian Open Champion and three-time JBJJF All Japan Champion in lower belt divisions, Rida is an ADCC 2022 Veteran and a black belt Pan-American No-GI silver medallist.

== Early life and education ==
Haisam Rida was born on 25 July 1993 in Accra, Ghana. He moved to Tokyo with his family at age 15. He started Brazilian jiu-jitsu (BJJ) in September 2010 in Kanagawa under Yamada Shigetaka, from who he received all his belts from white to brown. In 2016 he joined Carpe Diem Academy in Tokyo where he received his black belt from Yuki Ishikawa in 2018. It was Ishikawa who gave him the nickname 'Giraffe', in reference to his tall and lanky build.

In November 2020 Rida left Japan and moved to Michigan to train at Assembly Jiu Jitsu. On 11 April 2023, Rida announced that he was leaving Assembly Jiu Jitsu, and moving to Austin, Texas to train at B Team Jiu Jitsu.

== Career ==
=== 2020–2021 ===
Rida competed against Igor Tanabe at Quintet Fight Night 5 on 27 October 2020 and was submitted with a leglock. He then faced Nonso Ebede at Fight 2 Win 167 on 20 March 2021 and won a unanimous decision. Rida was then invited to compete against Sloan Clymer at Who's Number One: Lovato Jr. v Burns on 30 April 2021, winning another unanimous decision.

Rida returned to Who's Number One on 18 June 2021 to compete against Keenan Cornelius, but instead faced his student Miha Perhavec after Cornelius withdrew due to injury. He submitted Perhavec with an armbar, registering the fastest submission win in the promotion's history. This performance led to Rida being invited to compete in the heavyweight division of the Who's Number One Championships on 25–26 September 2021. He was submitted by the eventual champion Tim Spriggs in the opening round, but came back to defeat both Orlando Sanchez and Giancarlo Bodoni to win a bronze medal.

He then competed in the main event of Submission Underground 28 against Andy Varela on 31 October 2021, losing the match in EBI overtime.

=== 2022 ===
Rida returned to Who's Number One on 25 March 2022 to compete against Elder Cruz. He won the match after submitting Cruz with a rear-naked choke.

At the 2022 ADCC World Championship, Rida was invited to compete at the event for the very first time. He won an upset victory in the opening round, submitting multiple-champion Roberto "Cyborg" Abreu by arm-bar. Rida then lost on points in the quarter-final to Roosevelt Sousa. He returned to compete in the absolute division at the same event, but went out in the opening round to the 88 kg champion Giancarlo Bodoni.

Rida was invited to take part in a tournament shortly afterward at EBI 20: The Absolutes on 23 October 2022. He withdrew from the event shortly before it took place however, and did not compete. Rida was then invited to compete in an absolute grand prix at UFC Fight Pass Invitational 3 on 13 December 2022. He was submitted in Patrick Gaudio with a triangle choke in the opening round.

=== 2023 ===
Rida was set to compete against fellow ADCC 2022 veteran Vinicius 'Trator' Ferreira at Grapple in the Temple 3 on 27 January 2023. He lost the match by decision. On 11 April 2023, Rida announced that he was leaving Assembly Jiu-Jitsu and would represent B-Team Jiu-Jitsu moving forward instead.

Rida was then invited to compete in an openweight tournament at UFC Fight Pass Invitational 4 on 29 June 2023. He lost in the opening round to Fedor Nikolov.

Rida was scheduled to compete against Felipe Pena at Who's Number One 19 on 10 August 2023. He lost the match by submission.

Rida competed at Quintet 4 on 10 September 2023 where he represented Team Sakuraba. Rida drew his only match and his team went out in the opening round.

Rida stepped in on short notice to replace Gordon Ryan against Mason Fowler at UFC Fight Pass Invitational 5 on 10 December 2023. He lost the match by submission.

=== 2024 ===
Rida competed in the IBJJF No Gi Absolute Grand Prix on 29 February 2024. He was submitted by the eventual champion Kaynan Duarte in the opening round.

Rida will compete at EBI 21: The Absolutes on 2 June 2024.

Rida was invited to compete in the over 99 kg division at the 2024 ADCC World Championship. He beat Victor Honorio by decision in the opening round and was submitted by Dan Manasoiu in the quarter-final.

Rida competed against Roberto ‘Cyborg’ Abreu in the main event of ADXC 8 on 6 December 2024. He lost the match by decision.

=== 2025 ===
Rida competed in the no gi absolute grand prix at BJJ Stars 16 on 25 July 2025. He won his first match but was knocked out in the semi-final.

== Brazilian Jiu-Jitsu competitive summary ==
Main Achievements (black belt):

- IBJJF American Nationals No-Gi Champion (2020 / 2021)
- Quintet Fight Night II Champion (2019)
- 2nd place Pan-American No-Gi Championship (2022)
- 2nd place Quintet II Challenge (2018)
- 3rd place IBJJF American Nationals No-Gi (2020 (Note: Absolute))
- 3rd place UAEJJF Grand Slam Tokyo (2019)
- 3rd FloGrappling's WNO Championships (2021)

Main Achievements (colored belt):

- IBJJF Asian Open Champion (2018 (Note: Weight and absolute))
- JBJJF All Japan Champion (2017/2018)
- 2nd place UAEJJF Grand Slam Tokyo (2017 brown)
- 3rd place IBJJF European Open (2018 brown)
- 3rd place UAEJJF Abu Dhabi Pro (2018 brown)
