= 2022 ADCC World Championship =

Submission wrestling event held in 2022

2022 ADCC Submission Fighting World Championship
- Venue: Thomas & Mack Center
- Location: Las Vegas, USA
- Dates: 17–18 September 2022
- Competitors: 97; 81 men, 16 women
- Website: 2022 ADCC

The 2022 ADCC Submission Fighting World Championship was an international submission grappling tournament held at the Thomas & Mack Center in Las Vegas, Nevada, USA, from 17–18 September 2022.

== Background ==
The ADCC World Championship is a submission grappling tournament held every two years, widely considered to be the most prestigious submission grappling tournament in the world. The 2022 edition of the ADCC world championships attracted some of the most high-profile sponsors that the tournament has ever seen, most notably The Joe Rogan Experience and ONE Championship.

The 14th edition of the championship was originally scheduled to take place in September 2021 but was postponed to 2022 due to the international travel restrictions and the global lockdowns, caused by the COVID-19 pandemic.

In order to participate, competitors were required to place first in a continental qualifying event, known as ADCC Trials, or by being invited to compete by the organisation. Returning champions or previous world championships medallists were automatically qualified.

As a result of the delays associated with the pandemic, the second Asia and Oceania trial was cancelled and only seven trials events were conducted for ADCC 2022.

== Competition highlights ==
- Sam McNally, the lowest-seeded competitor in the 66 kg division upset number one seed Garry Tonon in a 3-0 win in the opening round.
- Kade Ruotolo won the 77 kg division at age 19 becoming the youngest-ever ADCC champion.
- Haisam Rida won an upset victory by submitting Roberto "Cyborg" Abreu by arm-bar in the 99 kg weight class.
- PJ Barch won an upset victory against JT Torres to prevent him from winning his third consecutive ADCC world title.
- Eoghan O'Flanagan surprised fans by defeating Xande Ribeiro and Mason Fowler, eventually finishing fourth in the 88 kg division.
- Amy Campo upset multiple-time ADCC champion Gabi Garcia, went on to win her division.
- Ffion Davies became the first British ADCC world champion.
- Gordon Ryan won the super-fight against André Galvão via rear naked choke.

== Participants ==
Men's divisions had sixteen competitors: eight qualified athletes, seven invitations and the defending ADCC champion. Women's divisions had eight competitors: approximately four qualified athletes, three invitations and the defending ADCC champion; there was some variation due to returning champions, invitees and trials winners moving into different weight divisions. Only the female winners of European, North and South American second trials or Asia & Oceania trial qualified for the World Championship.

=== Qualifiers ===
Trials			Men					Women	
Event	Date	Location	-66 kg	-77 kg	-88 kg	-99 kg	+99 kg	-60 kg	+60 kg
1st European Trials (Note: Full name: 1st ADCC European, Middle East & African Trial 2022)	18 September 2021	Poznan, Poland	(Wales) Ashley Williams	(Canada) Oliver Taza	(United Kingdom) Eoghan O’Flanagan	(Finland) Perttu Tepponen	(Finland) Heikki Jussila	(South Africa) Peyton Letcher (Note: 1st European Trials Female winners do not qualify for World Championship)	(Poland) Magdalena Loska
1st North American Trials (Note: Other name: ADCC North American East Coast Trials 2022)	6–7 November 2021	(United States) Atlantic City, US	(United States) Cole Abate	(United States) Kade Ruotolo	(United States) Giancarlo Bodoni	(United States) Mason Fowler (Note: -99 kg trial winner dropping down to -88 kg)	(United States) John Hansen	(Canada) Brianna Ste-Marie (Note: 1st North American Trials Female winners do not qualify for World Championship)	(United States) Kendall Reusing
2nd North American Trials (Note: Other name: ADCC North American West Coast Trials 2022)	2-3 April 2022	(United States) Las Vegas, US	(United States) Keith Krikorian	(United States) William Tackett	(United States) Jacob Rodriguez	(United States) Paul Ardila	(United States) Kyle Boehm (Note: +99 kg trial winner dropping down to -99 kg)	(Canada) Brianna Ste-Marie	(United States) Amy Campo
1st South American Trials	5–6 February 2022	(Brazil) Balneário Camboriú, Brasil	(Brazil) Diogo Reis	(Brazil) Micael Galvâo	(Brazil) Isaque Bahiense	(Brazil) Joao Costa	(Brazil) Roosevelt Sousa	(Brazil) Daiana Torquato (Note: 1st South American Trials Female winners do not qualify for World Championship)	(Brazil) Rebecca Albuquerque
2nd South American Trials	12–13 February 2022	(Brazil) Balneário Camboriú, Brasil	(Brazil) Fabricio Andrey	(Ecuador) Roberto Jimenez	(Brazil) Alexandre De Jesus	(Brazil) Henrique "Ceconi" Cardoso	(Brazil) Gutemberg Pereira (Note: Replaced by Max Gimenis due to injury)	(Brazil) Mayssa Bastos	(Brazil) Giovanna Jara
2nd European Trials (Note: Full name: 2nd ADCC European, Middle East & African Trial 2022)	7-8 May 2022	Lubon, Poland	(Republic of Ireland) Sam McNally	(Norway) Tommy Langaker	(Finland) Santeri Ilius	(South Africa) Luke Griffith	(Romania) Dan Manasoiu	(Norway) Julia Maele	(Cyprus) Eleftheria Christodolou
Asian Trials (Note: Full name: ADCC Asia & Oceania Trial 2022. The qualifier was due to take place in Singapore on 28 May 2022 but was canceled due to the coronavirus pandemic)	19 June 2022	Sydney, Australia	(Australia) Jeremy Skinner	(Japan) Kenta Iwamoto	(Australia) Roberto Dib Frias	(Australia) Izaak Michell	(Australia) Josh Saunders	(Australia) Adele Fornarino	(Australia) Nikki Lloyd-Griffiths

=== Invitees ===
Men					Women	
-66 kg	-77 kg	-88 kg	-99 kg	+99 kg	-60 kg	+60 kg
(Brazil) Ruan Alvarenga	(United States) JT Torres (Note: Returning champion)	(Brazil) Matheus Diniz	(Brazil) Kaynan Duarte (Note: +99 kg champion dropping down to -99)	(United States) Gordon Ryan (Note: Returning champion Ryan is competing in both the +99kg division and the superfight against André Galvão.)	(Brazil) Bianca Basilio	(Brazil) Gabi Garcia
(Brazil) Kennedy Maciel	(Australia) Lachlan Giles	(Brazil) Alexandre Ribeiro	(United States) Rafael Lovato Jr	(United States) Nick Rodriguez	(Brazil) Bia Mesquita	(Brazil) Rafaela Guedes
(United States) AJ Agazarm	(Brazil) Lucas Lepri	(United States) Josh Hinger	(Australia) Craig Jones	(Brazil) Felipe Pena	(Finland) Elvira Karppinen	(Brazil) Carina Santi
(Brazil) Gabriel Sousa	(Brazil) Davi Ramos	(United States) Tye Ruotolo	(United States) Tim Spriggs	(Brazil) João Gabriel Rocha	(Wales) Ffion Davies	(United States) Kendall Reusing (Note: 1st North American Trials Women's +60 kg winner)
(Canada) Ethan Crelinsten	(United States) Nicky Ryan	(Brazil) Vagner Rocha	(Brazil) Patrick Gaudio	(Brazil) Victor Hugo		
(United States) Geo Martinez	(Brazil) Renato Canuto	(Brazil) Lucas Barbosa	(Brazil) Nicholas Meregali	(United States) Orlando Sanchez		
(Brazil) Diego Pato	(Canada) Dante Leon	(United States) Jon Blank	(United States) Elder Cruz	(Ghana) Haisam Rida		
(United States) Josh Cisneros (Note: 2nd North American Trials 66 kg silver medalist)	(United States) Andy Varela		(Brazil) Vinicius Gazola	(Brazil) Roberto "Cyborg" Abreu		
(United States) Garry Tonon	(United States) PJ Barch		(United States) Devhonte Johnson	(Brazil) Vinny Magalhães		
			(Brazil) Yuri Simões	(United States) Damon Ramos		
				(Brazil) Max Gimenis (Note: Replaces +99 kg 2nd South American Trials winner Gutemberg Pereira due to injury)		

=== ADCC 2022 Superfight ===
The 2022 World Championship featured a superfight between André Galvão (ADCC Superfight champion, six ADCC titles ) vs Gordon Ryan (ADCC 2019 Absolute champion, unbeaten between 2018 and 2022). Ryan submitted Galvao at 16:04 via a rear-naked choke while holding a 12-0 lead.

== Results ==
=== Men ===
Division	Gold	Silver	Bronze
Absolute	(Brazil) Yuri Simões; CTA	(Brazil) Nicholas Meregali; New Wave Jiu Jitsu	
Absolute	(Brazil) Yuri Simões; CTA	(Brazil) Nicholas Meregali; New Wave Jiu Jitsu	(United States) Tye Ruotolo (Note: Roberto "Cyborg" Abreu withdrew due to injury); Atos Jiu-Jitsu
+99 kg	(United States) Gordon Ryan; New Wave Jiu Jitsu	(United States) Nick Rodriguez; B-Team	
+99 kg	(United States) Gordon Ryan; New Wave Jiu Jitsu	(United States) Nick Rodriguez; B-Team	(Brazil) Roosevelt Sousa (Note: Felipe Pena withdrew); Fight Sports
-99 kg	(Brazil) Kaynan Duarte; Atos Jiu-Jitsu	(Australia) Craig Jones; B-Team	
-99 kg	(Brazil) Kaynan Duarte; Atos Jiu-Jitsu	(Australia) Craig Jones; B-Team	(Brazil) Nicholas Meregali; New Wave Jiu Jitsu
-88 kg	(United States) Giancarlo Bodoni; New Wave Jiu Jitsue	(Brazil) Lucas Barbosa; Atos Jiu-Jitsu	
-88 kg	(United States) Giancarlo Bodoni; New Wave Jiu Jitsue	(Brazil) Lucas Barbosa; Atos Jiu-Jitsu	(Brazil) Vagner Rocha; Fight Sports
-77 kg	(United States) Kade Ruotolo; Atos Jiu-Jitsu	(Brazil) Micael Galvâo; Fight Sports	
-77 kg	(United States) Kade Ruotolo; Atos Jiu-Jitsu	(Brazil) Micael Galvâo; Fight Sports	(Canada) Dante Leon; GFTeam
-66 kg	(Brazil) Diogo Reis; Fight Sports	(Brazil) Gabriel Sousa; ZR Team	
-66 kg	(Brazil) Diogo Reis; Fight Sports	(Brazil) Gabriel Sousa; ZR Team	(Brazil) Diego "Pato" Oliveira; Dream Art

=== Women ===
Division	Gold	Silver	Bronze
+60 kg	(United States) Amy Campo; Zenith BJJ	(Brazil) Rafaela Guedes; Atos Jiu-Jitsu	
+60 kg	(United States) Amy Campo; Zenith BJJ	(Brazil) Rafaela Guedes; Atos Jiu-Jitsu	(Brazil) Gabi Garcia (Note: Kendall Reusing withdrew due to an injury sustained during the semi-finals); Alliance
-60 kg	(Wales) Ffion Davies; Atos International	(Canada) Brianna Ste-Marie; Brazilian Top Team (BTT)	
-60 kg	(Wales) Ffion Davies; Atos International	(Canada) Brianna Ste-Marie; Brazilian Top Team (BTT)	(Brazil) Bia Mesquita; Gracie Humaitá

=== ADCC 2022 Awards ===
- Best Athlete: Gordon Ryan
- Best Match: Vagner Rocha v Izaak Michell
- Best Throw: Nicholas Meregali
- Fastest Submission: Gordon Ryan

== Awards ==
The 2022 ADCC world championships won Fight Card of the Year at the 2022 Jitsmagazine BJJ Awards, and Diego "Pato" Oliveira won Submission of the Year for his quarter-final victory over Kennedy Maciel by Z-Lock.
