= Victor Hugo (grappler) =

Brazilian martial artist

Victor Hugo (born May 1, 1997, in Fortaleza, Brazil) is a four-time IBJJF World Champion at black belt, including double-gold in 100 kg and absolute divisions at the 2023 World Jiu-Jitsu Championship. He is the 2022 World IBJJF Jiu-Jitsu No-Gi Champion in the +97.5 kg division. At UFC Fight Pass Invitational 10 in 2025, he defeated 2024 CJI champion Nick Rodriguez by submission, having previously defeated Rodriguez in the main event of Who's Number One 22 on February 9, 2024.

Hugo earned a Brazilian jiu-jitsu black belt under Saulo Ribeiro and Xande Ribeiro of the Six Blades Association.
