= Helena Crevar =

American submission grappler

- Born: January 2007 (age 19); Las Vegas, Nevada, USA
- Weight: 65 kg (143 lb; 10 st 3 lb)
- Team: New Wave Jiu Jitsu
- Trainer: John Danaher
- Rank: BJJ black belt (under John Danaher)

Helena Crevar is an American submission grappler. In 2026, she won the women's +65 kg division at the ADCC World Championship. She is a Polaris and WNO Champion, and winner of the women's tournament at CJI2. Crevar is the youngest-ever ADCC podium placer, winning silver at the 2024 ADCC World Championship at age 17. In 2026, she became the youngest gold medalist in ADCC World Championship history with her win at 2026 ADCC World Championship. Crevar is the youngest no-gi #1 pound-for-pound athlete ever: since September 3, 2025, she has been ranked the #1 pound-for-pound women’s no-gi grappler in the world by FloGrappling, and holds the top rankings in both the 145 lb and 155 lb divisions.

Crevar moved to Austin, Texas at age 15 years old to train at New Wave Jiu Jitsu under coach John Danaher. She was promoted to black belt in 2025 after winning the brown belt IBJJF World Championship. Crevar became the youngest WNO champion at age 18 after winning against Elisabeth Clay.

In 2025, Crevar defeated Maggie Grindatti Lira at UFC Fight Pass Invitational 10 in Las Vegas.

== Instructor lineage ==
Carlos Gracie > Helio Gracie > Carlos Gracie Jr > Renzo Gracie > John Danaher > Helena Crevar
