= Renzo Gracie Academy =

Martial arts school

- Est.: 1996
- Founded by: Renzo Gracie
- Primary trainers: Renzo Gracie
- Training facilities: 224 West 30th Street, Manhattan, New York
- Website: renzogracieacademy.com

Renzo Gracie Academy is a martial arts school headed by Renzo Gracie, located in Midtown Manhattan.

== Overview ==
Renzo Gracie founded the academy in 1996. It was originally above a methadone clinic before it moved to its current location at 224 West 30th Street.

It was one of the camps participating in the International Fight League. Coached by Gracie, it took the place of the New York Pitbulls who were the 2007 IFL champions. The camp was established in 2008 when the IFL switched to a more camp based system than a team based system.

The Danaher Death Squad was a team under the academy that was established in 2011 before going independent in 2020.

== Notable people ==
=== Grapplers ===
- Renzo Gracie
- Gordon Ryan
- Garry Tonon
- Nick Rodriguez
- John Danaher
- Ricardo Almeida
- Craig Jones

=== Fighters ===
- Georges St. Pierre
- Matt Serra
- Chris Weidman
- Gunnar Nelson
- Corey Anderson
- Jim Miller
- Dan Miller
- Jared Gordon
- André Gusmão
- Rafael Natal
- Phillipe Nover
- Neiman Gracie
- Rolles Gracie Jr.
- Daniel Gracie
- David Branch
- Wagnney Fabiano
- Deividas Taurosevičius
- Fábio Leopoldo
- Heather Hardy

=== Others ===
- Chatri Sityodtong
- Harley Flanagan
- Anthony Bourdain
- Ali Abdelaziz
