= Giancarlo Bodoni =

Brazilian jiu-jitsu practitioner from the US

- Born: October 15, 1995 (age 31); Miami, Florida, USA
- Height: 5 ft 11 in (1.80 m)
- Division: Heavy: No-Gi Weight Classes; Under 91.5 kilograms (202 lb)
- Team: New Wave Jiu Jitsu; Alliance
- Trainer: John Danaher; Lucas Lepri
- Rank: Black belt in BJJ (under Lucas Lepri)

Giancarlo Bodoni is an American submission grappler and Brazilian jiujitsu black belt competitor from Miami, Florida. He is a two-time champion at the ADCC Submission Fighting World Championship.

== Biography ==
Giancarlo Bodoni was born on October 15, 1995, in Miami, Florida, US. Bodoni is Brazilian jiu-jitsu black belt under Lucas Lepri. In October 2021 Bodoni left Boston and his teaching position at Bernardo Faria Academy and moved to Austin, Texas, to train with Gordon Ryan and John Danaher at New Wave Jiu Jitsu.

== Professional grappling career ==
=== 2021-2022 ===
On November 6, 2021, Bodoni won the ADCC North American East Coast trials in the 88 kg division, earning his place at the 2022 ADCC World Championship. On February 9, 2022, he competed in the main event of Fight 2 Win 193 against Igor Schneider and won the match by unanimous decision.

In September 2022, he was not considered one of the pre-tournament favorites to win ADCC 2022 at 88 kg. He defeated Isaque Bahiense on points before submitting Matheus Diniz, Eoghan O'Flanagan, and Lucas 'Hulk' Barbosa to win the division. He then competed in the absolute division as well, submitting Haisam Rida before losing on points to his teammate Nicholas Meregali.

Bodoni was then invited to compete in EBI 20: The Absolutes on October 23, 2022. At the same time, he was given the opportunity to compete against Pedro Marinho for the Who's Number One Light-Heavyweight title on November 11, 2022. When competing at EBI 20, Bodoni won his first match against Austin Baker but was injured in the process and withdrew from the rest of the tournament. The same injury also forced him to withdraw from his title-fight against Marinho the following month.

=== 2023 ===
Bodoni's title-fight against Marinho was then rescheduled and the pair met in the co-main event of WNO: Rodriguez v Pena on February 25, 2023. Bodoni lost the match by decision and Marinho retained his title. He then competed at the IBJJF Houston International Open on May 14, 2023, and won gold medals in the super-heavyweight and absolute divisions.

Bodoni competed in the under 100 kg division at the ADCC Dallas Open on June 18, winning a gold medal. Bodoni was scheduled to compete at Quintet 4 on September 10, 2023 where he would represent Team New Wave. However, the entire team withdrew from the event and was replaced by B Team Jiu-Jitsu.

Bodoni competed in an 8-man tournament at Blue Collar FC: American Dream Conference on September 1, 2023. He defeated all three of his opponents and won the tournament.

Bodoni competed in an 8-man absolute grand prix tournament at Polaris 25 on September 30, 2023. He won his first match by submission but lost in the semi-final to Fabricio Andrey. This match with Andrey won 'Match of the Year' at the JitsMagazine BJJ Awards 2023. He then stepped in on short notice to replace his teammate Gordon Ryan in a match against Lucas 'Hulk' Barbosa at Who's Number One 21 on November 30, 2023. He won the match by judge's decision.

Bodoni will represented Team Modolfo in the under 91 kg division at AIGA Champions League Final 2023 on December 13 and 14. He won his semi-final match on points and his final match by submission in order to help Team Modolfo win the tournament.

=== 2024 ===
Bodoni competed in the IBJJF No Gi Absolute Grand Prix on February 29, 2024. He beat Patrick Gaudio on points and Pedro Rocha on advantages before losing to Kaynan Duarte on points in the final.

Bodoni was scheduled to compete against Gabriel Arges at UFC Fight Pass Invitational 7 on May 15, 2024. He won the match by submission.

Bodoni competed at EBI 21: The Absolutes on June 2, 2024. He won two matches by submission and lost to Dan Manasoiu in the semi-final.

Bodoni has been invited to compete in the under 88 kg division at the 2024 ADCC World Championship. He submitted Andre Porfirio and beat Gabriel Almeida by decision to make it to the semi-final. He defeated Felipe Costa by points to make it to the finals, and beat Jacob Rodriguez by decision to win the title. Bodoni returned in the men's absolute division where he beat Davi Ramos and Vagner Rocha but lost to Kaynan Duarte and Dante Leon to finish fourth. His match with Rodriguez was awarded ‘Best Match’ at the 2024 ADCC World Championship.

=== 2025 ===
Bodoni represented Williams Elite Team at the AIGA Champions League finals 2025, going 1-1 as Williams Elite Team finished in second place.

Bodoni was scheduled to compete against Rafael Lovato Jr. at ONE 173 on August 1, 2025. The match and whole event was pushed back to November 16, 2025. Bodoni lost the match by unanimous decision

== Brazilian Jiu-Jitsu competitive summary ==
Main achievements at black belt level:

- ADCC World Champion (2022) (Note: -88kg division)
- IBJJF Pan No-Gi Championship (2021)
- 2nd place IBJJF Pan No-Gi Championship (2020)
- 3rd place IBJJF Pan No-Gi Championship (2021 (Note: Absolute))

Main achievements in lower belts divisions:

- IBJJF World No-Gi Championship (2019 brown)
- IBJJF Pan Championship (2020 brown)
- 2nd Place IBJJF World Championship (2019 brown)
- 3rd Place IBJJF World Championship No-Gi (2019 brown)
- 3rd place IBJJF Pan Championship (2020 brown)
- 3rd place IBJJF Pan Championship No-Gi (2018 brown)
- 3rd place IBJJF European Open(2019 brown)

== Awards and honors ==
- Jitsmagazine 2022 BJJ Awards: Male Breakout Grappler of the Year

== See also ==
- List of Brazilian Jiu-Jitsu practitioners
