= KJCK =

KJCK may refer to:

- KJCK-FM, a radio station (97.5 FM) located in Junction City, Kansas, United States
- KJCK (AM), a radio station (1420 AM) located in Junction City, Kansas, United States

== See also ==
- CJCK-FM, callsign JCK in region C
- WJCK (disambiguation), callsign JCK in region W
