= Danaher Death Squad =

Submission grappling team

- Also known as: DDS
- Date founded: 2011
- Country of origin: United States
- Founder: John Danaher
- Current head: John Danaher
- Arts taught: Grappling, Brazilian jiu-jitsu
- Ancestor schools: Renzo Gracie Academy
- Descendant schools: B Team Jiu Jitsu; Kingsway Jiu-Jitsu

Danaher Death Squad (DDS) was an American submission grappling team founded by John Danaher which was originally part of the Renzo Gracie Academy. DDS team is known for their usage of leglocks as well as its accomplishment in major grappling competitions such as the ADCC Submission Fighting World Championship.

== Background ==
DDS was established in 2011 when John Danaher took over one of the morning classes at Renzo Gracie Academy. Around the same time he started teaching, Eddie Cummings had just started training at the school. Cummings liked Danaher's approach to Brazilian jiu-jitsu (BJJ) and would attend all of his morning classes. Eventually a team was formed that would use a leglock system devised by Danaher. Further members would join the team.

Former DDS member Ryan Quinn was the one who came up with the name 'Danaher Death Squad'. The name caught on and everyone within the BJJ world would start using it. However Danaher himself actually despises the name.

In December 2020, DDS split from the Renzo Gracie Academy to become an independent gym. It opened a training facility on an island in Puerto Rico which could avoid the restrictions related to COVID-19 lockdowns.The idea was that putting the gym within a tropical paradise would help attract more athletes. However the project was scrapped after only a few months. One of the main factors was the COVID-19 pandemic which made it difficult for people to travel to the island.

In July 2021, Gordon Ryan announced on Instagram that he was moving to Austin, Texas to start a new gym. Danaher followed up with a post of his own announcing that DDS was parting ways. It was reported while the team was in Puerto Rico there were some conflicts between members of the team such as differences in training philosophies and the failure of the new gym. After meeting together, the team decided the best thing for everyone to do was go their own ways.

Two new teams would be formed from DDS which were both in Austin, Texas. Danaher, Ryan, and Garry Tonon would go on to form New Wave Jiu Jitsu while Craig Jones and Nick Rodriguez formed B Team Jiu Jitsu. The two schools are located less than a 15-minute drive from one another.

In October 2024, Ryan said on Jake Shields' podcast that he placed much of the blame of the demise of DDS on Jones. Jones responded that both Danaher and Ryan were overworking and abusing athletes leading to members leaving.

== Style ==
DDS are standard-bearers of offense-based, submission-oriented grappling which has gathered interest from a large audience.

Danaher's philosophy is to be constantly on the offensive but use a progressive attacking model and not do things just for the sake of them. One should have complete control and immobilization of an opponent before going for the finish. 50% of the team's submissions derived from a bottom playing stance, 73% of those being lower limb submissions such as leglocks.

DDS have issued more than fifty DVD instructionals.

== Notable members ==
The following were notable members of Danaher Death Squad:

Name	Discipline	Current team	Notes
Gordon Ryan	Grappling	New Wave Jiu Jitsu	
Garry Tonon	Grappling	New Wave Jiu Jitsu	
Craig Jones	Grappling	B Team Jiu Jitsu	
Nick Rodriguez	Grappling	B Team Jiu Jitsu	
Jake Shields	Mixed martial arts	-	
Erin Blanchfield	Mixed martial arts	Silver Fox BJJ	

== See also ==
- John Danaher
- Renzo Gracie Academy
- B Team Jiu Jitsu
