= B Team Jiu Jitsu =

Brazilian jiu-jitsu academy and competition team

- Also known as: The B-Team
- Date founded: 2021
- Country of origin: United States
- Founder: Craig Jones, Seth Belisle, Nicky Ryan, Nick Rodriguez, and Ethan Crelinsten
- Arts taught: Grappling, Brazilian jiu-jitsu
- Ancestor schools: Danaher Death Squad
- Practitioners: See notable members
- Official website: Official website

B Team Jiu Jitsu (Note: also stylized as B-Team Jiu-Jitsu) or The B-Team, is a submission grappling team based in Austin, Texas. Founded by ADCC silver medalist Craig Jones, it is regarded as one of the top grappling organizations in the world.

== History ==
The B-Team was founded in 2021 after a split in John Danaher's Danaher Death Squad. The B-Team was initially headed by former Danaher team members Craig Jones, Nicky Ryan, Nick Rodriguez, and Ethan Crelinsten. Around the same time of The B-Team's founding, Danaher, Gordon Ryan, and Garry Tonon created New Wave Jiu Jitsu in Austin, Texas.

In 2022, The B-Team's Jay Rodriguez won the ADCC North American West Coast trials in the 88kg division, while Izaak Michell won the ADCC Asia and Oceania trials in the 99kg division. Izaak Michell later left The B-Team due to disputes over responsibilities, pay, and ownership of the team.

During the 2022 ADCC World Championships, The B-Team was represented by seven athletes competing across all weight classes. Nick Rodriguez won silver in the +99 kg class while Craig Jones won silver at −99 kg. In January 2023, B-Team member Damien Anderson announced that he was opening a B-Team location in New Jersey.

From August 16–17, 2024, B-Team head Craig Jones held the Craig Jones Invitational (CJI), counterprogramming the broadcast of the 2024 ADCC World Championship.

On May 6, 2025, Craig Jones announced through an Instagram post that Jay Rodriguez had been banned from the team and gym, due to alleged predatory behavior with female members of B-Team. This was later confirmed by Rodriguez through two posts on his own Instagram account.

From August 30–31, 2025, Jones held the Craig Jones Invitational 2 (CJI 2), which featured a team-based tournament won by The B-Team. Following CJI 2, Jones closed The B-Team academy. The gym now operates under new ownership, being rebranded as Simple Man Martial Arts with Nicky Ryan as head coach.

== Notable members ==
A list of notable current and former members:

- Craig Jones
- Nicky Ryan (former)
- Nick Rodriguez (former)
- Ethan Crelinsten (former)
- Jozef Chen (former)
- Haisam Rida (former)
- Jay Rodriguez (former)

== See also ==
- Craig Jones Invitational
- Danaher Death Squad
- New Wave Jiu Jitsu
