= WJCK =

WJCK may refer to:

- WJCK (FM), a radio station (88.3 FM) in Anniston, Alabama, United States
- WJCK-FM, former callsign of WLQI, a radio station (97.7 FM) in Rensselaer, Indiana, United States
- WJCK-TV, former callsign of WWTI, a television station (TV 50) in Watertown, New York, United States

== See also ==
- CJCK-FM, callsign JCK in region C
- KJCK (disambiguation), callsign JCK in region K
