= 2024 ADCC World Championship =

Submission wrestling event to be held in 2024

2024 ADCC Submission Fighting World Championship
- Venue: T-Mobile Arena
- Location: Las Vegas, USA
- Dates: 17–18 August 2024
- Competitors: TBD
- Website: ADCC

The 2024 ADCC Submission Fighting World Championship was an international submission grappling tournament held at the T-Mobile Arena in Las Vegas, Nevada, in August 2024.

== Background ==
The ADCC World Championship is a submission grappling tournament held every two years, widely considered to be the most prestigious submission grappling tournament in the world.

Competitors have to qualify by finishing first at a continental qualifying events, known as ADCC Trials, or by being invited to compete by the organization. Returning champions were automatically qualified.

2024 will be the first edition of the tournament to have a third women's weight division. This marks the first edition of the tournament since 2007 to have more than two women's divisions. Head organizer Mo Jassim later confirmed that this would also be the first edition of the tournament since 2007 to include a women's absolute division.

It was announced in July 2024 that all competitors would be paid to show for the first time ever, and that they would receive a minimum of $2,500.

The timing of the tournament overlaps with the inaugural Craig Jones Invitational, which also led to notable withdrawals by fighters including Tommy Langaker, Roberto Jimenez, Kade and Tye Ruotolo.

== Participants ==
Men's divisions will have sixteen competitors: eight qualified athletes, seven invitations and the defending ADCC champion. Women's divisions will have eight competitors: approximately four qualified athletes, three invitations and the defending ADCC champion; there may be some variation due to returning champions, invitees and trials winners moving into different weight divisions. Only the female winners of European, Asia & Oceania, North American, and South American second trials qualify for the World Championship.

=== Qualifiers ===
Trials			Men					Women		
Event	Date	Location	-66 kg	-77 kg	-88 kg	-99 kg	+99 kg	-55 kg	-65 kg	+65 kg
1st European Trials (Note: Full name: 1st ADCC European, Middle East & African Trial 2024)	16 September 2023	Warsaw, Poland	(England) Owen Jones	(South Africa) ~~Jozef Chen~~	(Finland) Santeri Lilius	(South Africa) Luke Griffith	(Finland) Heikki Jussila	(Norway) Josefine Modig (Note: 1st European Trials Female winners do not qualify for World Championship)	(Finland) Sani Brannfors	(Norway) Ane Svendsen
1st North American Trials (Note: Other name: ADCC North American East Coast Trials 2023)	14–15 October 2023	(United States) Atlantic City, New Jersey, USA	(United States) Dorian Olivarez	(United States) Elijah Dorsey	(United States) Jacob Couch	(United States) Paul Ardila	(United States) Dan Manasoiu	(United States) Alexandira Enriquez (Note: 1st North American Trials Female winners do not qualify for World Championship)	(United States) Morgan Black	(United States) Amanda Leve
2nd North American Trials (Note: Other name: 2024 ADCC North American Trials 2)	30–31 March 2024	(United States) Las Vegas, Nevada, USA	(United States) Deandre Corbe	(United States) ~~Andrew Tackett~~	(United States) ~~William Tackett~~	(United States) Michael Pixley	(United States) Mike Perez	(United States) Jasmine Rocha	(United States) Helena Crevar	(United States) Elizabeth Mitrovic
1st South American Trials	2 March 2024	Belo Horizonte, Brazil	(Brazil) Kennedy Maciel	(Brazil) Luiz Medeiros	(Brazil) Charles Negromonte	(Brazil) Cassio Costa	(Brazil) ~~Jose Inacio dos Santos~~	(Brazil) Brenda Larissa (Note: 1st South American Trials Female winners do not qualify for World Championship)	(Brazil) Ana Quieroz	(Brazil) Maria Ruffatto
2nd South American Trials	9 March 2024	Sao Paulo, Brazil	(Brazil) Fabricio Andrey	(Brazil) Alexandre de Jesus	(Brazil) Pedro Marinho	(Brazil) Henrique Cardoso	(Brazil) Victor Honorio	(Brazil) Anna Rodrigues	(Brazil) Ana Vieira	(Brazil) Maria Ruffatto
2nd European Trials (Note: Full name: 2nd ADCC European, Middle East & African Trial 2024)	17 February 2024	Zagreb, Croatia	(Russia) Gairbeg Ibragimov	(Norway) ~~Tommy Langaker~~	(England) Taylor Pearman	(Poland) Marcin Maciulewicz	(Scotland) Mark Macqueen	(Italy) Margot Ciccarelli	(France) Aurelie Le Vern	(England) Nia Blackman
1st Asian Trials (Note: Full name: 1st ADCC Asia & Oceania Trial 2023.)	25 November 2023	Singapore	(Australia) Ethan Thomas	(Japan) ~~Kenta Iwamoto~~	(Australia) Izaak Michell	(Australia) Declan Moody	(Australia) Josh Saunders	(Australia) Adele Fornarino (Note: 1st Asian Trials Female winners do not qualify for World Championship)	(China) Wang Jue	(Australia) Hillary Loh
2nd Asian Trials	10 May 2024	Bangkok, Thailand	(China) Xu Huaiqing	(Australia) ~~Levi Jones-Leary~~	(Australia) ~~Lucas Kanard~~	(Australia) Daniel Schuardt	(Kazakhstan) Mansur Makhmakhanov	(Australia) Adele Fornarino	(Australia) Sula-Mae Loewenthal	(Australia) Nikki Lloyd-Griffiths

=== Invitees ===
Men					Women		
-66 kg	-77 kg	-88 kg	-99 kg	+99 kg	-55 kg	-65 kg	+65 kg
(Brazil) Diogo Reis (Note: Automatic invite due to being the prior tournament's gold medalist in this weight class.)	(United States) ~~Kade Ruotolo~~	(United States) Giancarlo Bodoni	(Brazil) Kaynan Duarte	(United States) Gordon Ryan	(Wales) ~~Ffion Davies (Note: Automatic invite due to being the prior tournament's gold medalist. Women's weigh classes were restructured between tournaments, so the division they are invited to is TBD.)~~	(United States) Amy Campo	(Brazil) ~~Gabi Garcia~~
(Canada) Ethan Crelinsten	(United States) JT Torres	(United States) ~~Tye Ruotolo~~	(United States) ~~Mason Fowler~~	(Brazil) ~~Victor Hugo~~	(Brazil) ~~Mackenzie Dern~~	(Brazil) Beatriz Mesquita	(Brazil) Nathiely De Jesus
(Brazil) Kauã Gabriel	(United States) ~~Nicky Ryan~~	(United States) Jacob Rodriguez	(United States) Cyborg Abreu	(Brazil) Gutemberg Pereira	(Brazil) Mayssa Bastos	(Canada) Brianna Ste-Marie	
(Wales) Ashley Williams	(Brazil) Jonnatas Gracie	(Brazil) Gabriel Almeida	(Ecuador) ~~Roberto Jimenez~~	(United States) ~~Nick Rodriguez~~		(United States) Amanda Leve	
(United States) Josh Cisneros	(Brazil) Micael Galvão	(United States) Elder Cruz	(Brazil) Nicholas Meregali	(Brazil) Felipe Pena		(United States) Morgan Black	
(United States) Kieth Krikorian	(Canada) Dante Leon		(United States) Rafael Lovato Jr.				
(Brazil) Deigo Oliveira	(United States) PJ Barch		(Brazil) Eli Braz				
(Brazil) Gabriel Sousa	(Canada) Oliver Taza		Alex Grandy				
	(United States) ~~Andy Varela~~						
	(Uruguay) Javier Zaruski						
	(Poland) Mateusz Szczecinski						

== Results ==
=== Men ===
Division	Gold	Silver	Bronze
-66 kg	(Brazil) Diogo Reis; Melqui Galvao Jiu-Jitsu	(Brazil) Diego "Pato" Oliveira; Dream Art	
-66 kg	(Brazil) Diogo Reis; Melqui Galvao Jiu-Jitsu	(Brazil) Diego "Pato" Oliveira; Dream Art	(United States) Josh Cisneros; Elite Team Visalia
-77 kg	(Brazil) Micael Galvâo; Melqui Galvao Jiu-Jitsu	(Brazil) Vagner Rocha; Vagner Rocha Martial Arts	
-77 kg	(Brazil) Micael Galvâo; Melqui Galvao Jiu-Jitsu	(Brazil) Vagner Rocha; Vagner Rocha Martial Arts	(United States) PJ Barch; 10th Planet Jiu Jitsu
-88 kg	(United States) Giancarlo Bodoni; New Wave Jiu Jitsu	(United States) Jay Rodriguez; B Team Jiu Jitsu	
-88 kg	(United States) Giancarlo Bodoni; New Wave Jiu Jitsu	(United States) Jay Rodriguez; B Team Jiu Jitsu	(Brazil) Felipe Costa; Six Blades Jiu-Jitsu
-99 kg	(Brazil) Kaynan Duarte; Atos Jiu-Jitsu	(United States) Rafael Lovato Jr. Lovato Jiu-Jitsu	
-99 kg	(Brazil) Kaynan Duarte; Atos Jiu-Jitsu	(United States) Rafael Lovato Jr. Lovato Jiu-Jitsu	(Brazil) Cyborg Abreu; Fight Sports
+99 kg	(Brazil) Felipe Pena; Gracie Barra	(South Africa) Luke Griffith; New Wave Jiu Jitsu	
+99 kg	(Brazil) Felipe Pena; Gracie Barra	(South Africa) Luke Griffith; New Wave Jiu Jitsu	(United States) Daniel Manasoiu; New Wave Jiu Jitsu
Absolute	(Brazil) Kaynan Duarte; Atos Jiu-Jitsu	(Brazil) Cyborg Abreu; Fight Sports	
Absolute	(Brazil) Kaynan Duarte; Atos Jiu-Jitsu	(Brazil) Cyborg Abreu; Fight Sports	(Canada) Dante Leon; GFTeam

=== Women ===
Division	Gold	Silver	Bronze
-55 kg	(Australia) Adele Fornarino; Dominance MMA	(Brazil) Bianca Basílio; Atos Jiu-Jitsu	
-55 kg	(Australia) Adele Fornarino; Dominance MMA	(Brazil) Bianca Basílio; Atos Jiu-Jitsu	(Brazil) Jasmine Rocha; Vagner Rocha Martial Arts
-65 kg	(Brazil) Ana Carolina Vieira; GFTeam	(United States) Helena Crevar; New Wave Jiu Jitsu	
-65 kg	(Brazil) Ana Carolina Vieira; GFTeam	(United States) Helena Crevar; New Wave Jiu Jitsu	(Brazil) Beatriz Mesquita; Gracie Humaitá
+65 kg	(Brazil) Rafaela Guedes; Atos Jiu-Jitsu	(Brazil) Nathiely de Jesus; Soul Fighters	
+65 kg	(Brazil) Rafaela Guedes; Atos Jiu-Jitsu	(Brazil) Nathiely de Jesus; Soul Fighters	(United States) Kendall Reusing; Gracie Barra
Absolute	(Australia) Adele Fornarino; Dominance MMA	(Brazil) Beatriz Mesquita; Gracie Humaitá	
Absolute	(Australia) Adele Fornarino; Dominance MMA	(Brazil) Beatriz Mesquita; Gracie Humaitá	(United States) Amy Campo; Zenith BJJ

=== ADCC 2024 Superfight ===
Traditionally, ADCC Superfights feature the reigning Superfight champion vs the previous tournament's Absolute champion. Gordon Ryan won the Superfight and Yuri Simões won the Absolute division at the 2022 ADCC World Championship.

Gordon Ryan and Felipe Pena also had their fourth match as a superfight on the first day of the 2024 ADCC World Championship. Ryan won the match 2–0 on points and the score in their series of matches moved to two wins each.

=== Awards ===
- Best athlete - Kaynan Duarte
- Best new athlete - Helena Crevar
- Best match - Giancarlo Bodoni vs. Jacob Rodriguez
- Best throw - Michael Pixley
- Fastest submission - Owen Jones
