= Kyle Boehm =

Kyle Boehm (b. April 19, 1987 Escondido, California) is a submission grappler and 10th Planet Jiu-Jitsu black belt.

In his career he has defeated Kaynan Duarte, Dan Borovic, and Tex Johnson.

In 2019 Boehm won 1st Place at BJJ Fanatics Grand Prix and 1st Place at King Of The Mats Invitational. At 2020 KASAI Pro 7 Boehm lost to Nick Rodriguez on points. Boehm qualified for the 2022 ADCC World Championship.

== See also ==
- List of Brazilian Jiu-Jitsu practitioners
