= Rafael Lovato Jr. =

American Brazilian jiu-jitsu practitioner and mixed martial artist

- Born: June 25, 1983 (age 43); Cincinnati, Ohio, U.S.
- Height: 6 ft 3 in (191 cm)
- Weight: 195 lb (88 kg; 13.9 st)
- Division: Middleweight; Light Heavyweight
- Reach: 77 1/2 in (197 cm)
- Style: Brazilian jiu-jitsu
- Team: Lovato Jiu-Jitsu Association
- Rank: 5th degree black belt in Brazilian jiu-jitsu under Saulo Ribeiro and Xande Ribeiro
- Years active: 2014–2019, 2022

Mixed martial arts record
- Total: 11
- Wins: 11
- By knockout: 2
- By submission: 7
- By decision: 2
- Losses: 0

Other information
- Mixed martial arts record from Sherdog

Rafael Lovato Jr. (born June 25, 1983) is an American retired mixed martial artist and Brazilian jiu-jitsu competitor. At the time of his original retirement, he was the Bellator MMA Middleweight World Champion and was ranked the no. 4 middleweight fighter in the world.

He was the first non-Brazilian to win Brasileiros at black belt. In 2007, he was the first person to win the black belt "Grand Slam" of all major Brazilian jiu-jitsu competitions in a single year: Pan Championship, European Championship, Brasileiro, and World Championship.

== Early life ==
Lovato was born in Cincinnati, Ohio, but his family moved to Oklahoma City, Oklahoma, when he was eight years old. The son of a Jeet Kune Do instructor, Lovato studied a variety of martial arts in his youth and competed in amateur boxing before discovering Brazilian jiu-jitsu at age 13. He is of Spanish and Italian descent.

== Brazilian jiu-jitsu career ==
Lovato was the second American, after B.J. Penn, to win the World Jiu Jitsu Championship as a black belt.

Lovato is a black belt under Carlos Machado, the oldest of the Machado family. Rafael has had a long and formative training history with Xande and Saulo Ribeiro, one which began after he competed against Saulo in the finals of the 2003 Arnold Classic, when Rafael was just 19 years old.

Lovato currently manages his own academy in Oklahoma City, Oklahoma.

=== Return to grappling ===
After retiring from MMA due to medical issues, Lovato Jr. made a return to competing in BJJ, starting out by unsuccessfully challenging Aaron 'Tex' Johnson for the Fight 2 Win Light-Heavyweight Masters Championship at F2W 151 on September 11, 2020. Lovato Jr. competed again shortly after at BJJ Stars 4 on November 14, 2020, where he was submitted with a crucifix choke by Dimitrious Souza. He also competed at the IBJJF Masters World Championships 2020, claiming silver in the absolute division after a close final match with Gregor Gracie.

==== 2021 ====
He returned to Fight 2 Win for F2W 166 on March 13, 2021, to compete against Gabriel Almeida in the main event, submitting him with a kimura. On April 30, 2021, Lovato Jr. headlined a Who's Number One event against Gilbert Burns, losing the match by unanimous decision. Lovato Jr. returned to headline another Fight 2 Win event at F2W 177 on July 16, 2021, where he defeated Alexandro Ceconi by unanimous decision to win the promotion's Light-Heavyweight no gi title.

He defended his light-heavyweight no gi title at F2W 180 on August 6, 2021, defeating Gabriel Arges by unanimous decision. He then competed at Raw Grappling 1 on November 14, 2021, against Adam Wardzinski, defeating him by penalty points. In his final matches of 2021, Lovato Jr. represented Team LFA at UFC FightPass Invitational 1. Team LFA won the tournament, with Lovato Jr. submitting Mike Wilcox with a rear-naked choke and registering two draws against Jonathan Piersma and Travis Tooke.

==== 2022 ====
Lovato Jr. had also verbally agreed to compete against the reigning ADCC World Champion Gordon Ryan at some point in 2021. After the match did not come to fruition, Lovato Jr won the 2022 IBJJF European Open and competed in that year's world championships, retiring from IBJJF competition on the mats after his final match. He competed at the ADCC World Championships in 2022 and finished fourth in the under 99 kg division, announcing his retirement from that competition at the same time.

==== 2023 ====
Lovato Jr. was booked to compete in the co-main event of Who's Number One 18 on May 18, 2023, against Elder Cruz. Lovato Jr won the match, submitting Cruz with a rear-naked choke.

Lovato Jr. competed at the IBJJF Master World Championship on September 2, 2023, where he won the master 1 super-heavyweight division.

Lovato Jr. was then invited to challenge Pedro Marinho for the WNO light-heavyweight title at Who's Number One 20: Night of Champions on October 1, 2023. Marinho withdrew from the match due to injury and was replaced by Ricardo Evangelista, with the match being changed to a non-title bout. Lovato Jr. won the match by submission.

The match between Lovato Jr. and Pedro Marinho for the WNO light-heavyweight title was then rescheduled for Who's Number One 21: Ryan v Barbosa on November 30, 2023. After Gordon Ryan withdrew from the event, Lovato Jr. vs Pedro Marinho was promoted to the main event. Lovato Jr. lost the match by judge's decision.

==== 2024 ====
Lovato Jr. competed against Craig Jones in the main event of UFC Fight Pass Invitational 6 on March 3, 2024. He lost the match by submission.

Lovato Jr. faced Felipe Pena in a heavyweight match at Who's Number One 23: Meregali vs Rocha on May 10, 2024. He lost the match by decision.

Lovato Jr. was invited to compete in the under 99 kg division at the 2024 ADCC World Championship. He defeated Elioenai Braz on points, submitted Patrick Gaudio, and beat Michael Pixley by decision before being submitted by Kaynan Duarte in the final and winning a silver medal. He then won the super-heavyweight division of the IBJJF No Gi European Championship on October 20, 2024. Lovato Jr. then won a gold medal in the super-heavyweight division of the IBJJF no gi Pan Championship 2024 on November 3, 2024.

==== 2025 ====
Lovato Jr. won a bronze medal in freestyle wrestling at the US Masters National Open 2025. He then won a gold medal in the super-heavyweight division of the IBJJF No Gi Brazilian National Championship 2025, becoming the first person to win all four IBJJF majors in both and no gi.

Lovato Jr. was scheduled to compete against Giancarlo Bodoni at ONE 173 on August 1, 2025. The match and whole event was pushed back to November 16, 2025.

== Mixed martial arts career ==
=== Legacy Fighting Alliance ===
Lovato made his professional MMA debut on September 26, 2014, at LFA 35, against Canaan Grigsby. He won the fight by an arm-triangle choke at the end of the first round. His next fight came at LFA 46, against the future UFC middleweight contender Kevin Holland. Lovato Jr. won the fight by a rear naked choke, 84 seconds into the first round.

After these two victories, Lovato Jr. was scheduled to fight Marcelo Nunes at LFA 54, for the Middleweight title. Lovato Jr. won the fight by TKO near the end of the second round. He was scheduled to make his first title defense against Cortez Coleman at LFA 62. He submitted Coleman with an armbar in the last minute of the third round.

=== Bellator MMA ===
In March 2017, Lovato made his debut for Bellator MMA. He faced Charles Hackmann at Bellator 174 and won the fight via TKO just 13 seconds into the first round.

In his second Bellator bout, Lovato faced Mike Rhodes at Bellator 181 on July 14, 2017. Rafael Lovato Jr. won the fight via submission in the first round.

Lovato faced Chris Honeycutt at Bellator 189 on December 1, 2017 and Rafael Lovato Jr. won the fight by unanimous decision.

Lovato was expected to face John Salter at Bellator 198 on April 28, 2018. John Salter was later pulled from the event by the Illinois Athletic Commission due to an eye issue on April 24 and replaced by Gerald Harris. Rafael Lovato Jr. won the fight via armbar submission in the first round.

Lovato faced John Salter on September 21, 2018, at Bellator 205. Rafael Lovato Jr. won the fight via a submission.

==== Bellator Middleweight World Champion ====
Lovato was scheduled to face Gegard Mousasi for the Bellator Middleweight World Championship. This bout was expected to serve as the co-headliner of Bellator 214. On December 20, 2018, it was reported that Mousasi pulled from the fight, citing a back injury and Lovato was pulled from the card. The bout against Mousasi was rescheduled to June 22, 2019, in London, England, at Bellator 223. Lovato defeated Mousasi by majority decision.

On January 29, 2020, while appearing on the Joe Rogan Experience, Lovato revealed that he was diagnosed with a brain condition called cerebral cavernoma, a condition where a group of abnormal blood vessels are formed, usually found in the brain and spinal cord, and can make one even more susceptible to brain damage than usual. Lovato stated that the condition was nearly a reason for him to be pulled from his title bout with Gegard Mousasi, but he was ultimately given clearance. However, after further review on the potential risks of the condition weeks following the bout against Mousasi, commissions in Europe have stated they will not give Lovato clearance to fight in Europe any longer. Per the advice of his doctors, Lovato then said for the time being his MMA career is on hold, though he did not announce retirement and remained hopeful he would fight again in the future. On February 10, 2020, it was announced that Lovato had relinquished the Bellator Middleweight title.

=== Post-Bellator ===
Lovato Jr. went on record to state his desire to return to professional MMA for at least one more fight, and ideally in 2021. However, his wish would eventually materialize later, as Lovato made his return to MMA on December 28, 2022, at Inoki Bom-Ba-Ye x Ganryujima against undefeated Taiga Iwasaki. He won the bout in the first round, submitting Iwasaki with a kimura. After the fight, Lovato Jr stopped short of announcing his retirement from MMA and announced that he was open to the possibility of more fights in the future.

As of March 2023, Lovato Jr. still remained indefinitely suspended by athletic commissions in both United States and Europe.

== Personal life ==
Lovato Jr. and his wife have twins.

== Championships and accomplishments ==
=== Mixed martial arts ===
- Bellator MMA
  - Bellator Middleweight World Championship (One time; former)
- Legacy Fighting Championship
  - Legacy FC Middleweight Championship (One time; former)
    - One successful title defense

== Mixed martial arts record ==
Professional record breakdown
| 11 matches | 11 wins | 0 losses |
| By knockout | 2 | 0 |
| By submission | 7 | 0 |
| By decision | 2 | 0 |

| Res. | Record | Opponent | Method | Event | Date | Round | Time | Location | Notes |
|---|---|---|---|---|---|---|---|---|---|
| Win | 11–0 | Taiga Iwasaki | Submission (kimura) | Inoki Bom-Ba-Ye x Ganryujima | December 28, 2022 | 1 | 2:10 | Tokyo, Japan | Catchweight (195 lb) bout. |
| Win | 10–0 | Gegard Mousasi | Decision (majority) | Bellator 223 | June 22, 2019 | 5 | 5:00 | London, England | Won the Bellator Middleweight World Championship. Later relinquished the title due to a cerebral cavernoma diagnosis. |
| Win | 9–0 | John Salter | Submission (rear-naked choke) | Bellator 205 | September 21, 2018 | 3 | 4:27 | Boise, Idaho, United States | |
| Win | 8–0 | Gerald Harris | Submission (armbar) | Bellator 198 | April 28, 2018 | 1 | 1:11 | Rosemont, Illinois, United States | Catchweight (188 lb) bout. |
| Win | 7–0 | Chris Honeycutt | Decision (unanimous) | Bellator 189 | December 1, 2017 | 3 | 5:00 | Thackerville, Oklahoma, United States | |
| Win | 6–0 | Mike Rhodes | Submission (rear-naked choke) | Bellator 181 | July 14, 2017 | 1 | 1:59 | Thackerville, Oklahoma, United States | |
| Win | 5–0 | Charles Hackmann | TKO (knees and punches) | Bellator 174 | March 3, 2017 | 1 | 0:13 | Thackerville, Oklahoma, United States | Catchweight (195 lb) bout. |
| Win | 4–0 | Cortez Coleman | Submission (armbar) | Legacy FC 62 | November 11, 2016 | 3 | 4:04 | Oklahoma City, Oklahoma, United States | Defended the Legacy FC Middleweight Championship. |
| Win | 3–0 | Marcelo Nunes | TKO (punches) | Legacy FC 54 | April 22, 2016 | 2 | 4:51 | Catoosa, Oklahoma, United States | Won the vacant Legacy FC Middleweight Championship. |
| Win | 2–0 | Kevin Holland | Submission (rear-naked choke) | Legacy FC 46 | October 2, 2015 | 1 | 1:24 | Allen, Texas, United States | |
| Win | 1–0 | Canaan Grigsby | Submission (arm-triangle choke) | Legacy FC 35 | September 26, 2014 | 1 | 4:07 | Tulsa, Oklahoma, United States | Middleweight debut. |

== See also ==
- List of Brazilian jiu-jitsu practitioners
- List of male mixed martial artists
- List of multi-sport athletes
- List of multi-sport champions
- List of undefeated mixed martial artists
