= Tye Ruotolo =

American submission grappler and mixed martial artist (b. 2003)

- Born: January 22, 2003 (age 23); Maui, Hawaii, U.S.
- Height: 5 ft 10 in (1.78 m)
- Weight: 169.8 lb (77 kg; 12 st)
- Division: Welterweight (Note: As Ruotolo is currently competing in ONE, he fights at 170 lbs. ONE Championship refers to their 170 lb division as Lightweight, but per the Association of Boxing Commissions in the United States, 170 lbs is considered Welterweight.)
- Reach: 77 in (196 cm)
- Style: Submission Grappling; Brazilian Jiu-Jitsu
- Team: Atos Jiu-Jitsu; Art of Jiu Jitsu (AOJ) Combat Submission Wrestling (CSW)
- Trainer: André Galvão; Guilherme Rafael Mendes (BJJ); Erik Paulson (MMA)
- Rank: BJJ black belt (under André Galvão)

Mixed martial arts record
- Total: 3
- Wins: 3
- By submission: 3
- Losses: 0

Other information
- Notable relatives: Kade Ruotolo (twin brother)
- Mixed martial arts record from Sherdog

Tye Ruotolo (born January 22, 2003) is an American submission grappler and mixed martial artist. He currently competes in the Lightweight and Welterweight divisions of ONE Championship, where he is the current ONE Lightweight MMA World Champion, along with being the current and inaugural ONE Welterweight Submission Grappling World Champion. A competitor with his twin brother Kade since the age of 3, Ruotolo is currently the youngest IBJJF World champion at black belt level in the history of the sport.

At the 2019 ADCC World Championship, Ruotolo as a 16-year-old was the youngest competitor to participate in the competition and also to reach the semi-finals where he eventually came fourth place. Following promotion to black belt in December 2021, Ruotolo became a two division Who's Number One (WNO) champion, world champion at the 2022 World Jiu-Jitsu Championship, and a bronze medalist at the 2022 ADCC World Championship.

== Background ==
Born in Maui, Hawaii, of Italian and Puerto Rican heritage, Ruotolo was raised in Huntington Beach, California, and began competing in jiujitsu at age 3. Tye and his twin brother Kade were considered "grappling's first child-stars" and earned a sponsorship with RVCA at the age of 10. They trained at the Art Of Jiu-Jitsu academy (AOJ) for 4 years under Guilherme and Rafael Mendes before switching to Atos jiu-jitsu in 2017, a team to which AOJ was affiliated.

== Grappling career ==
In 2019, Ruotolo who was a 16-year-old blue belt, participated in the 2019 ADCC World Championship in the Lightweight division making him the youngest competitor in history at the time. He defeated Bruno Frazatto and Pablo Mantovani before losing to Kennedy Maciel in the semi-final. He faced Paulo Miyao in the Bronze medal match and lost on points. Ruotolo caught Miyao in a kneebar but refused to tap which has resulted in Miyao's knee suffering long term damage.

Both Tye and his brother Kade were promoted to brown belts in BJJ by André Galvão in October 2020.

=== Black belt career ===
In September 2021, Ruotolo became WNO 185 lb champion by defeating Johnny Tama, Dante Leon and Micael Galvão.

In the 2021 IBJJF World Jiu-Jitsu Championship, Ruotolo faced his brother, Kade in the finals of Brown Belt Lightweight division. Ruotolo submitted Kade by armbar. Shortly after this, both of them were promoted to black belt on December 14, 2021, by André Galvão.

In January 2022, Ruotolo became a two division WNO champion after winning the WNO 170 lb championship by submitting Levi Jones by kneebar.

In the 2022 IBJJF World Jiu-Jitsu Championship, Ruotolo earned a silver medal in the Black Belt Lightweight division after losing to Micael Galvão in the finals on points, but was later declared the world champion after Galvão tested positive for clomiphene. This meant that Ruotolo became the youngest IBJJF black belt world champion of all time.

In the 2022 ADCC World Championship, Ruotolo competed in the Absolute division against heavier opponents where he defeated Pedro Marinho and Felipe Pena before losing to Nicholas Meregali in a judge decision. Ruotolo obtained a bronze medal after Cyborg Abreu medically forfeited the bronze medal match. Before that, he also fought at the 88 kg division. In round one, he lost to mentor and teammate, Josh Hinger in overtime.

Ruotolo competed in the IBJJF World Championship 2023 on June 3 and 4, 2023 and won a bronze medal in the middleweight division.

Ruotolo was originally scheduled to compete in the 2024 ADCC World Championship but he and his brother Kade withdrew in order to enter the under 80 kg division at the inaugural Craig Jones Invitational on August 16–17. Tye Ruotolo submitted Jason Nolf in the opening round and lost in the quarter-final to Levi Jones-Leary by referee decision.

=== ONE Championship ===
On May 20, 2022, Ruotolo faced Garry Tonon at ONE 157 for his submission grappling debut in the promotion. He submitted Tonon by D'Arce choke in 97 seconds. This win earned Ruotolo his first Performance of the Night bonus award.

On December 3, 2022, Ruotolo faced former ONE Featherweight World Champion, Marat Gafurov in a submission grappling catchweight bout of 180 lbs at ONE on Prime Video 5. Ruotolo submitted Gafurov by triangle armbar. This win earned Ruotolo his second Performance of the Night bonus award.

Ruotolo was scheduled to face Reinier de Ridder on May 5, 2023, at ONE Fight Night 10. He won the match by unanimous decision. In his post-fight interview, Ruotolo challenged Nicholas Meregali to be his next opponent in ONE Championship.

Ruotolo competed against Dagi Arslanaliev at ONE Fight Night 13 on August 5, 2023. He won the match by rear-naked choke submission and was awarded a Performance of the Night bonus award.

Ruotolo competed against Magomed Abdulkadirov for the inaugural ONE Championship welterweight submission grappling title at ONE Fight Night 16 on November 3, 2023. He won the match by decision, winning the title and earning a $50,000 Performance of the Night bonus.

Ruotolo was to make his first welterweight title-defense against Izaak Michell at ONE 166 on March 1, 2024. However, the bout was moved back to ONE Fight Night 21 on April 5, 2024, for unknown reasons. Ruotolo won the match by submission with an arm-in rear-naked choke.

Ruotolo competed in a catchweight match against Jozef Chen at ONE Fight Night 23 on July 6, 2024. He won the match by decision.

Ruotolo defended his ONE Championship welterweight title against Dante Leon at ONE Fight Night 31 on May 2, 2025. He won the match via unanimous decision.

== Mixed martial arts career ==
The contract that Ruotolo signed to compete in grappling matches for ONE Championship also included provisions for MMA fights as well. Both Tye and his brother Kade Ruotolo announced that they were going to make their professional mixed martial arts debuts before the end of 2023.

In his MMA debut, Ruotolo fought and defeated Adrian Lee with a submission via rear naked choke in his MMA debut at ONE Fight Night 35 on September 5, 2025.

For his second MMA bout, Ruotolo faced Shozo Isojima at ONE 173 on November 16, 2025. He again won the bout via a rear-naked choke submission in the first round.

In his third MMA bout, Ruotolo faced Christian Lee for the ONE Lightweight World Championship at ONE: The Inner Circle 37 on November 6, 2026. He won the bout after dropping Lee with a punch and then securing a rear-naked choke submission in the first round.

== Brazilian Jiu-Jitsu competitive summary ==
Main Achievements:

- ONE Championship
  - ONE Welterweight Submission Grappling World Championship (One time, current)
    - Three successful title defenses
  - Performance of the Night (Four times) vs. Garry Tonon, Marat Gafurov, Dagi Arslanaliev and Magomed Abdulkadirov
  - 2024: Submission of the Year vs. Izaak Mitchell (Tied with Kade Ruotolo def. Francisco Lo)
- Who's Number One
  - 2 x WNO Champion (170 lb & 185 lb)
- International Brazilian Jiu-Jitsu Federation
  - 1st place IBJJF World Championship (2022)
- 3QG
  - 2nd place 3QG Kumite 5 GP (2020)
- ADCC Submission Fighting World Championship
  - 3rd place ADCC World Championship (2022)
  - 4th place ADCC World Championship (2019)

Main Achievements (Juvenile + Colored belts):

- IBJJF World Champion (2019, 2021 brown belt)
- IBJJF European Champion (2019)
- 2nd place IBJJF European Championship (2019 (Note: Absolute))

== Instructor lineage ==
Mitsuyo "Count Koma" Maeda → Carlos Gracie, Sr. → Helio Gracie → Rolls Gracie → Romero "Jacare" Cavalcanti → Alexandre Paiva → Fernando "Tererê" Augusto → André Galvao → Tye Ruotolo

== Championships and accomplishments ==
=== Mixed martial arts ===
- ONE Championship
  - ONE Lightweight World Championship (One time; current)

== Mixed martial arts record ==
Professional record breakdown
3 matches	3 wins	0 losses
By submission	3	0

Res.	Record	Opponent	Method	Event	Date	Round	Time	Location	Notes
Win	3–0	Christian Lee	Submission (rear-naked choke)	ONE: The Inner Circle 37	November 6, 2026	1	2:08	Bangkok, Thailand	Won the ONE Lightweight Championship (170 lb). Performance of the Night.
Win	2–0	Shozo Isojima	Submission (rear-naked choke)	ONE 173	November 16, 2025	1	2:26	Tokyo, Japan	
Win	1–0	Adrian Lee	Submission (rear-naked choke)	ONE Fight Night 35	September 6, 2025	2	4:14	Bangkok, Thailand	Welterweight debut. Performance of the Night.
