= JCK MMA =

Chinese MMA promotion

Jue Cheng King
- Native name: JCK战觉城笼斗终极冠军赛
- Company type: Private
- Industry: Mixed martial arts promotion
- Founded: 2019; 7 years ago
- Headquarters: Lüliang, Shanxi, China
- Owner: All-weather (hainan) Online Sports Co., Ltd
- Website: jckmma.com

JCK MMA (Jue Cheng King; Chinese: JCK战觉城; pinyin: JCK Zhàn Jué Chéng) is a Chinese mixed martial arts promotion. It is currently partnered with the UFC Fight Pass platform.

== History ==
JCK MMA originated in 2019. Its first event, JCK 1 was held on 29 November 2019, in Taiyuan, Shanxi.

JCK MMA officially debuted in 2020. The aim was to promote martial arts in China.

In 2021, JCK MMA was voted winner of the 2021 Top 10 National IP Selection in the sports category.

In June 2022, JCK MMA signed a multi-event agreement with the UFC to have their fights air via its UFC Fight Pass streaming platform. Fighters who trained at the UFC Performance Institute in Shanghai participated in its 2022 events.

As of December 2022, more than 600 fighters from over 150 clubs across China have participated in JCK MMA.

== Broadcast coverage ==
JACK MMA is broadcast on Chinese television for free.

JCK MMA is available via streaming on UFC Fight Pass.

Events are held weekly on every Saturday night at 7 pm (7 am in US ET).

== Format ==
The promotion's format is similar to that of the Professional Fighters League in that it has a seasonal, tournament-style format. There are 32 fighters per weight class. Each fighter is guaranteed to have five fights per season to determine the rankings. For each division, the top ranked fighters will compete against each other in a playoff finale. The winner will be awarded a cash prize of ¥1 million RMB (US$150,000).

Starting from the 2022 season, former winners and veterans of JCK MMA get a shorted route to the finals where they take part in the JCK Super Round. Six fighters in each division will face each other three times to obtain a ranking and the bottom two are eliminated.

Currently there are divisions from flyweight to welterweight for men. Additional divisions from middleweight to heavyweight as well as female divisions are also being added.

== Rules ==
JCK MMA uses the Unified Rules of Mixed Martial Arts.

== Weight classes ==
Weight class	Upper weight limit
Strawweight	115 lb (52.2 kg)
Flyweight	125 lb (56.7 kg)
Bantamweight	135 lb (61.2 kg)
Featherweight	145 lb (65.8 kg)
Lightweight	155 lb (70.3 kg)
Welterweight	170 lb (77.1 kg)
Middleweight	185 lb (83.9 kg)
Light heavyweight	205 lb (93.0 kg)
Heavyweight	265 lb (120.2 kg)

== Current Champions ==
Weight class	Champion
Flyweight	Buhuoyouga
Bantamweight	Wang Shaoxiang
Featherweight	Wang Jizheng
Lightweight	Aili Mulatebieke
Welterweight	Ding Meng

=== Tournaments ===
Year	Flyweight	Bantamweight	Featherweight	Lightweight	Welterweight
2020	N/A	Li Haojie	Yuan Chunbo	N/A	Kuerbanjiang Tuluosibake
2021	Shuai Yin	Li Haojie	Asikeerbai Jinensibieke	Yibugele	N/A
2022	Shang Zhifa	Wang Shaoxiang	Wang Jizheng	N/A	N/A
