= Kingsway Jiu-Jitsu =

Submission grappling team

- Date founded: 2021
- Country of origin: United States
- Founder: John Danaher; Gordon Ryan; Garry Tonon
- Current head: John Danaher
- Arts taught: Grappling, Brazilian jiu-jitsu
- Ancestor schools: Danaher Death Squad
- Official website: kingswayjiujitsu.com

Kingsway Jiu-Jitsu, formerly known as New Wave Jiu Jitsu (New Wave), is an American submission grappling team and gym located in Austin, Texas. Led by John Danaher, it was formed in 2021 after a split in the Danaher Death Squad and shares a rivalry with B Team Jiu Jitsu as the top teams in No-Gi grappling .

== Background ==
In July 2021 it was announced that the Danaher Death Squad was splitting up. Around the same time, Gordon Ryan announced on Instagram that he had founded New Wave Jiu Jitsu in Austin, Texas with John Danaher and Garry Tonon. The other team established from the split was B Team Jiu Jitsu which was formed by Craig Jones and Nick Rodriguez and also based in Austin.

New Wave was awarded with 'Gym of the Year' at the Jits Magazine 2022 BJJ Awards as a result of the competition team's performance throughout the year.

In April 2025, New Wave was rebranded Kingsway Jiu-Jitsu.

== Style ==
Kingsway Jiu-Jitsu is led by coach John Danaher. The style of the team has been described as 'direct'.

== Notable members ==
The following are members of Kingsway Jiu-Jitsu:

=== Grapplers ===
- Gordon Ryan
- Garry Tonon
- Giancarlo Bodoni
- Nicholas Meregali
- Luke Griffith
- Daniel Manasoiu
- Helena Crevar

== See also ==
- Danaher Death Squad
- B Team Jiu Jitsu
