= Vagner Rocha =

Brazilian mixed martial artist

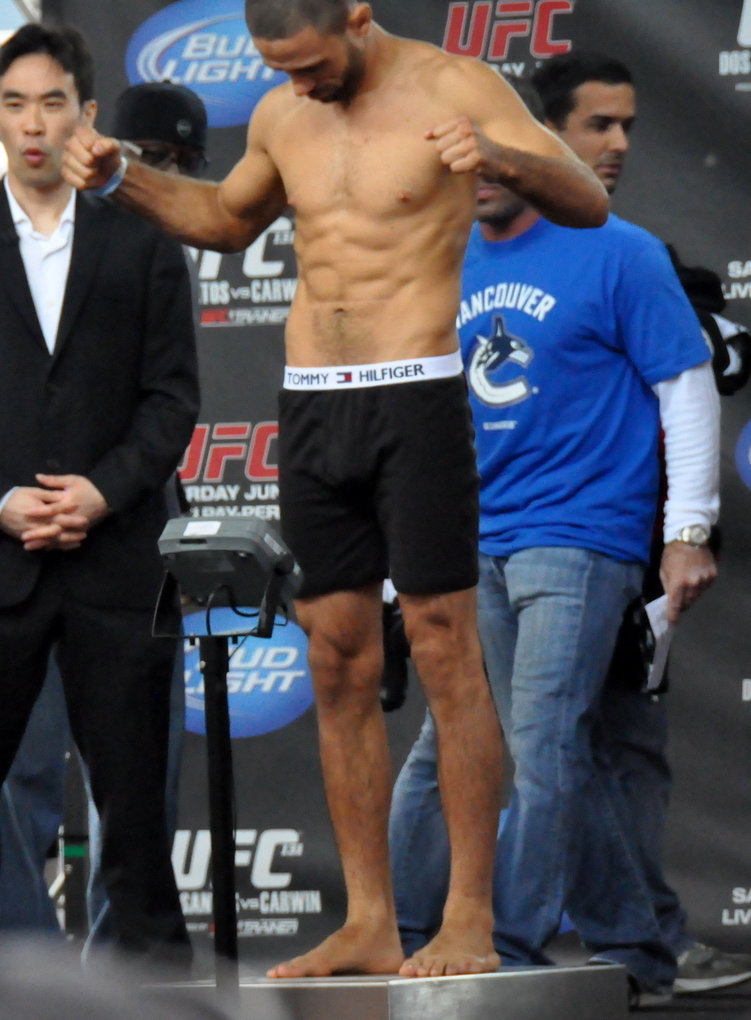
- Born: June 6, 1982 (age 44); Rio de Janeiro, Brazil
- Other names: Ceará
- Height: 5 ft 11 in (1.80 m)
- Weight: 155 lb (70 kg; 11 st 1 lb)
- Division: Featherweight (2012); Lightweight (2011–2017); Welterweight (2009–2011)
- Reach: 73 in (185 cm)
- Stance: Orthodox
- Fighting out of: Pembroke Pines, Florida, United States
- Team: Vagner Rocha Martial Arts
- Rank: 3rd degree black belt in Brazilian jiu-jitsu
- Years active: 2009–2017 (MMA); 2017–present (submission grappling)

Mixed martial arts record
- Total: 18
- Wins: 14
- By knockout: 3
- By submission: 8
- By decision: 3
- Losses: 4
- By knockout: 1
- By submission: 1
- By decision: 2

Other information
- Mixed martial arts record from Sherdog
- Last updated on: May 18, 2010

Vagner Rocha (born June 6, 1982) is a Brazilian submission grappler and former professional mixed martial artist, who competed in the featherweight division. He is the 2017 Combat Jiu-Jitsu Worlds lightweight champion.

== Mixed martial arts career ==
Primarily known for his expertise in Brazilian jiu-jitsu, Rocha began his MMA career in 2009. In addition to regional promotions in his adopted state of Florida, Rocha has competed for Bellator and Strikeforce.

=== Ultimate Fighting Championship ===
Vagner made his UFC debut on June 11, 2011, against Donald Cerrone at UFC 131, replacing an injured Mac Danzig. Cerrone dominated Rocha by utilizing leg kicks, Rocha lost via unanimous decision.

In his second UFC bout, Rocha defeated Cody McKenzie on September 17, 2011 at UFC Fight Night 25. Rocha submitted McKenzie via rear naked choke in the second round.

Rocha was expected to make his featherweight debut against Mike Brown on January 15, 2012, at UFC on FX 1. However, Brown was forced from the bout with an injury. Rocha instead made his featherweight debut against Jonathan Brookins on February 15, 2012, at UFC on Fuel TV 1. He lost the fight via KO in the first round. After the loss to Brookins, Rocha was subsequently released from the promotion.

=== Fight Time Promotions ===
Rocha faced Mike Bruno on November 2, 2012, at Fight Time 12. Rocha won the fight by submission due to a triangle choke in the second round.

Rocha faced Kamrin Naville on February 15, 2013, at Fight Time 13. Rocha won the fight by unanimous decision.

Rocha faced J. P. Reese on April 26, 2013, at Fight Time 14. Rocha won the fight by submission in the fifth round.

Rocha faced journeyman Randy Barroso on August 23, 2013, at Fight Time 16. Rocha won the fight by submission in the first round.

=== Return to UFC ===
On April 20, 2014, it was announced that Rocha would return at UFC 172 to replace Yancy Medeiros, who shifted in the card to face Jim Miller, against Joe Ellenberger. However, Rocha suffered a last-minute training injury and the bout was removed from the card.

Rocha faced Jake Matthews on November 8, 2014, at UFC Fight Night 55. He lost the fight due to technical submission in the second round.

Rocha was expected to face promotional newcomer Joseph Duffy on March 14, 2015, at UFC 185. However, Rocha pulled out of the bout in early February citing injury and was replaced by Jake Lindsey. Rocha was subsequently released from the promotion.

== Professional grappling career ==
Rocha competed against Xande Ribeiro in a superfight at BJJ Bet on September 6, 2020, and the pair fought to a draw. He then fought Gabriel Almeida in the co-main event of Fight 2 Win 157 on November 14, 2020, submitting him with an inside heelhook and earning 'Submission of the Night'. For his final match of the year, he was booked against Jon 'Thor' Blank at Who's Number One on December 11, 2020. In the end, Rocha won by split decision.

On January 16, 2021, Rocha was scheduled to face William Tackett in the main event of Fight 2 Win 160, but had to withdraw due to undisclosed reasons. He returned to competition on February 19, 2021, in the main event of Fight 2 Win 164 against Yuri Simões and defeated him by decision. He was then scheduled to compete against Gordon Ryan in the main event of Who's Number One on March 26, 2021. Rocha lost the match by submission, tapping to a triangle choke. He returned to Who's Number One on May 28, 2021, to face Josh Hinger and won a decision against him.

Rocha received an invite to compete at the 2022 ADCC World Championship as a result of his silver medal in 2019. Rocha went 3–1 at the event and won a bronze medal in the 88 kg division. On December 4, 2022, Rocha fought in a Combat Jiu-Jitsu superfight against Ty Freeman at Subversiv 8, submitting him with a rear-naked choke.

Rocha was handed a three-year suspension from IBJJF competition by USADA as a result of refusing to submit a sample for testing on December 23, 2022.

=== 2023 ===
Rocha was then invited to compete in an openweight tournament at UFC Fight Pass Invitational 4 on June 29, 2023. Rocha defeated Fellipe Andrew in the opening round but lost to the eventual winner, Nick Rodriguez, in the semi-final.

Rocha competed at the Tough Roll Winter Grand Prix on June 29, 2023, winning a decision against Uros Silic.

Rocha was booked to compete against Victor Silveiro at UFC Fight Pass Invitational 5 on December 10, 2023. He won the match by submission with a rear-naked choke.

=== 2024 ===
Rocha competed against Luke Griffith in the first Pit Submission Series event on January 26, 2024. He beat Griffith by decision. He then competed at the ADCC Atlantic City Open on February 10, 2024 and won gold in the under 91 kg division.

Rocha faced Nicholas Meregali in the main event of Who's Number One 23 on May 10, 2024. He lost the match by submission.

Rocha was invited to compete in the under 77 kg division of the 2024 ADCC World Championship. He beat Jeremy Skinner, Jonnatas Gracie, and Elijah Dorsey by decision before being submitted by Micael Galvão in the final and winning a silver medal. He also entered the men's absolute division, where he beat Fabricio Andrey in the opening round and was submitted by Giancarlo Bodoni in the quarter-final.

Rocha competed against Calon Sabino in the main event of Pit Submission Series 8 on October 11, 2024. He won the match by submission.

=== 2025 ===
Rocha faced Kit Dale in the main event of Who’s Number One 29 on July 25, 2025. He won the match by decision.

== Titles and accomplishments ==
- Fight Time Promotions
  - Fight Time Lightweight Championship (Two times)
  - ISKA Lightweight Championship (One time)
- Combat Jiu Jitsu Worlds
  - Combat Jiu Jitsu World Championship - Lightweight (current)
- ADCC
  - Bronze medal at 88 kg (2022)
  - Best match at 2022 ADCC World Championship (2022)

== Personal life ==
He is married, has 2 children, and currently resides in Pembroke Pines, Florida where he teaches Brazilian Jiu-Jitsu at Vagner Rocha Martial Arts.

Both Rocha's son Achilles and his daughter Jasmine train under him and both are frequent competitors in primarily no-gi grappling. Jasmine is a black belt in BJJ & his son Achilles is also a black belt.

Rocha announced on January 22, 2025 that he was hospitalized with heart failure, although he has since made a recovery.

== Mixed martial arts record ==
Professional record breakdown
18 matches	14 wins	4 losses
By knockout	3	1
By submission	8	1
By decision	3	2

Res.	Record	Opponent	Method	Event	Date	Round	Time	Location	Notes
Win	14–4	Yoislandy Izquierdo	Decision (unanimous)	Fight Time 35: A New Era	February 17, 2017	5	5:00	Miami, Florida, United States	Defended the Fight Time Lightweight Championship.
Win	13–4	Rafael Alves	TKO (leg kicks)	Fight Time 32	August 12, 2016	3	2:36	Fort Lauderdale, Florida, United States	Defended the Fight Time Lightweight Championship.
Win	12–4	Gabriel Miranda	TKO (punches)	Fight Time 30	April 22, 2016	1	4:35	Fort Lauderdale, Florida, United States	Won the Fight Time Lightweight Championship.
Loss	11–4	Jake Matthews	Technical Submission (rear-naked choke)	UFC Fight Night: Rockhold vs. Bisping	November 8, 2014	2	1:52	Sydney, Australia	
Win	11–3	Randy Barroso	Submission (triangle choke)	Fight Time 16: Rocha vs. Barroso	August 23, 2013	1	3:09	Fort Lauderdale, Florida, United States	Defended the Fight Time Lightweight Championship.
Win	10–3	J. P. Reese	Submission (rear-naked choke)	Fight Time 14: This Means War!	April 26, 2013	5	2:18	Fort Lauderdale, Florida, United States	Defended the Fight Time Lightweight Championship.
Win	9–3	Kamrin Naville	Decision (unanimous)	Fight Time 13: MMA Kings	February 15, 2013	3	5:00	Fort Lauderdale, Florida, United States	Non-title bout.
Win	8–3	Mike Bruno	Submission (triangle choke)	Fight Time 12: Warriors Collide	November 2, 2012	2	0:53	Fort Lauderdale, Florida, United States	Won the Fight Time Promotions and ISKA Lightweight Championship.
Loss	7–3	Jonathan Brookins	KO (punches)	UFC on Fuel TV: Sanchez vs. Ellenberger	February 15, 2012	1	1:32	Omaha, Nebraska, United States	Featherweight debut.
Win	7–2	Cody McKenzie	Submission (rear-naked choke)	UFC Fight Night: Shields vs. Ellenberger	September 17, 2011	2	3:49	New Orleans, Louisiana, United States	
Loss	6–2	Donald Cerrone	Decision (unanimous)	UFC 131	June 11, 2011	3	5:00	Vancouver, British Columbia, Canada	
Win	6–1	Jacob Clark	Submission (armbar)	MFA: New Generation 5	May 7, 2011	1	2:32	Miami, Florida, United States	Lightweight debut.
Loss	5–1	Bret Bergmark	Decision (unanimous)	Strikeforce: Fedor vs. Werdum	June 26, 2010	3	5:00	San Jose, California, United States	
Win	5–0	Francisco Soares	TKO (punches)	Bellator 13	April 8, 2010	2	2:07	Hollywood, Florida, United States	
Win	4–0	Patrick Mikesz	Submission (armbar)	Action Fight League: Rock-N-Rumble 2	March 5, 2010	1	2:10	Hollywood, Florida, United States	
Win	3–0	Renato Puente	Submission (armbar)	NDC 1: Peru vs. American Top Team	October 17, 2009	1	1:06	Lima, Peru	
Win	2–0	Igor Gracie	Decision (unanimous)	Bellator 11	June 12, 2009	3	5:00	Uncasville, Connecticut, United States	
Win	1–0	Alan Arzeno	Submission (rear-naked choke)	XCF: Rumble in Racetown 1	February 14, 2009	1	0:42	Daytona Beach, Florida, United States	

== See also ==
- List of male mixed martial artists
