= John Danaher (martial artist) =

New Zealand martial artist (born 1967)

- Born: April 2, 1967 (age 59); Washington, D.C., U.S.
- Nationality: New Zealander
- Style: Brazilian Jiu-Jitsu
- Team: Renzo Gracie Academy; New Wave Jiu Jitsu; Danaher Death Squad; Sanabul
- Rank: 6th degree black belt in Brazilian jiu-jitsu (under Renzo Gracie)

John Danaher (born April 2, 1967) is a New Zealand martial artist. He is a Brazilian jiu-jitsu and mixed martial arts (MMA) instructor and coach. Danaher is widely regarded as one of the best instructors and coaches in these sports.

Danaher holds a 6th-degree black belt in Brazilian jiu-jitsu under Renzo Gracie, and he is a former instructor at the Renzo Gracie Academy in Manhattan. Danaher grew up in New Zealand and arrived in the United States in 1991 to study at Columbia University's philosophy Ph.D. program. After arriving in New York, Danaher was introduced to Brazilian jiu-jitsu by a friend at the university, and began taking classes at the Renzo Gracie Academy in Manhattan. He continued training at the academy and began to teach classes as well while Gracie was traveling for competition. Since receiving his black belt in April 2002, he has been an instructor for several notable jiu-jitsu and mixed martial arts competitors.

== Early life and education ==
John Danaher was born in Washington, D.C., United States. His father, a pilot in the Royal New Zealand Air Force, acted as an attaché to the United States military during the Vietnam War. His family later returned to Whangaparaoa, a small peninsula north of Auckland, New Zealand, where Danaher spent the remainder of his childhood. He learned Muay Thai, and some karate as martial arts were becoming popular in New Zealand.

After high school, Danaher attended the University of Auckland, where he earned a bachelor's, and later a master's degree in philosophy. In 1991, he returned to the United States to pursue a Ph.D. in epistemology under the direction of Isaac Levi at Columbia University in Manhattan, which he did not complete. While attending the university, Danaher worked as a bouncer at various Manhattan nightclubs.

== Martial arts career ==
While he had some striking ability from his time in New Zealand, Danaher's dedication to martial arts did not fully begin until he began training at the Renzo Gracie Academy in the early 1990s. While there, he studied under notable jiu-jitsu practitioner Renzo Gracie, and became one of his most dedicated students, alongside Rodrigo Gracie, Matt Serra, and Ricardo Almeida. As a purple belt, he began to teach some classes at the academy while Renzo was traveling to compete. Over the next several years, Danaher's responsibilities as an instructor at Renzo Gracie Academy grew, and Danaher became a full-time instructor at the school.

As Danaher has suffered throughout his life from severe leg and hip problems, he has never competed professionally and consequently has devoted his time and effort to teach. As his students have had success in competition and gained notoriety over the last several years, he is well known as a jiu-jitsu coach, having worked closely with fighters such as Georges St-Pierre and Chris Weidman. Additionally, he coached a group of notable jiu-jitsu competitors at the Renzo Gracie Academy, often referred to as the "Danaher Death Squad". The group included athletes such as Gordon Ryan, Garry Tonon, Nick Rodriguez, Craig Jones, and Nicky Ryan, who between them hold numerous world championships, spanning multiple organizations, including IBJJF, ADCC, Eddie Bravo Invitational, and others.

Since 2018, Danaher has been a brand ambassador and consultant for Sanabul. Danaher partnered with BJJ Fanatics for the release of his series of instructionals, the "Enter the System," "Go Further Faster," "Feet to Floor," "New Wave Jiu Jitsu," and "Standing to Ground" series.

In late 2020, Danaher announced that he would be leaving his teaching position at Renzo Gracie's New York Academy and would be moving to Puerto Rico to establish a new gym with some of his top students at the time. Gordon Ryan later revealed that a tentative opening date for the new academy was set for March 2021. However, in July 2021 Danaher announced that Danaher Death Squad had split up and shortly after, news surfaced that he was moving to Austin, Texas to open up a new gym called New Wave Jiu Jitsu alongside two of his most popular students, Garry Tonon and Gordon Ryan. Since the opening of New Wave Jiu-Jitsu, Danaher has managed to attract several notable new students like multiple-time IBJJF world champion Nicholas Meregali and teenage BJJ prodigy Helena Crevar.

John Danaher and his gym, New Wave Jiu-Jitsu, was awarded with 'Gym of the Year' at the Jitsmagazine 2022 BJJ Awards as a result of the competition team's performance throughout the year.

== Leg lock system ==
Danaher is also known for developing his own system of leg-locks and lower-body attacks. He was first introduced to the effectiveness of leg locks when Dean Lister, an American grappler who was having success in competitions utilizing leg-based attacks, came to train at Renzo Gracie Academy for two weeks in the early 2000s. With the leg lock system, Danaher was able to consolidate a large number of distinct positions and moves into a more formulaic and predictable series of procedures that could be executed by his students. Using the principles that Danaher set out in his system, his students had tremendous success utilizing leg locks in competition.

Danaher is credited with helping to alter the jiu-jitsu community's opinion of leg locks, as many saw them as a non-technical and ineffective method of attack before Danaher's students demonstrated their usefulness in competition. Danaher has since developed systems for various types of arm attacks (notably Kimura variations and armbars), back and rear strangle-based attacks, front headlock and guillotine attacks, and triangle attacks as part of a series. Most recently he has published beginner-oriented DVDs.

== Health problems ==
Danaher was born with deformed patellas, making him prone to knee injuries throughout his early years. In the 1980s, Danaher suffered a severe knee injury to his left leg while playing rugby, which required surgery. Multiple surgeries on his left knee resulted in artificial shortening of the leg and deformed ligaments, drastically inhibiting Danaher's ability to properly extend and retract his knee. Over the years, this imbalance proceeded to cause other problems for Danaher. Namely, an unbalanced gait subjected his left hip to undue force and strain, leading to severe osteoarthritis. The damaged hip ultimately required a replacement surgery, which Danaher underwent in 2015. Danaher then underwent multiple surgeries during 2025 to correct issues stemming from these injuries, forcing him to reconsider his coaching career.

== TV and film appearances ==
In 2017, Danaher appeared in four episodes of the Showtime series Billions, in which he portrays the jiu-jitsu instructor of U.S. Attorney Chuck Rhoades (Paul Giamatti). In 2012, he appeared as himself on the Spike TV series MMA Uncensored Live episode “King Mo Reigns”.

In 2015, Danaher co-starred in the documentary "Jiu Jitsu vs the World" alongside renowned Brazilian jiu-jitsu practitioners Eddie Bravo, Renzo Gracie, and Roberto Abreu, among others.

In 2010, Danaher was a coach for George St. Pierre's team in season 12 of the Ultimate Fighter reality show on Spike TV and briefly appeared in several episodes.

== Notable students ==
=== Mixed martial arts ===
- Georges St-Pierre
- Chris Weidman
- Jake Shields

=== Brazilian jiu-jitsu ===
- Gordon Ryan
- Garry Tonon
- Craig Jones
- Helena Crevar
- Nicholas Meregali
- Giancarlo Bodoni
- Nick Rodriguez

=== Others ===
- Travis Stevens
- Firas Zahabi

== Instructor lineage ==
Kano Jigoro → Tomita Tsunejiro → Mitsuyo Maeda → Carlos Gracie Sr. → Helio Gracie → Rolls Gracie → Carlos Gracie Jr. → Renzo Gracie → John Danaher
