= Craig Jones (grappler) =

Australian grappler (born 1991)

- Born: 17 July 1991 (age 35); Adelaide, South Australia, Australia
- Height: 185 cm (6 ft 1 in)
- Weight: 208 lb (94 kg)
- Team: B Team Jiu-Jitsu; Danaher Death Squad; Absolute MMA
- Trainer: John Danaher; Lachlan Giles
- Rank: 3rd deg. black belt in Brazilian jiu-jitsu under Lachlan Giles

Craig Benjamin Jones (born 17 July 1991) is an Australian grappler and Brazilian jiu-jitsu (BJJ) black belt competitor and coach. He is a two-time ADCC Submission Wrestling World Championship silver medalist and a three-time Polaris Pro Grappling champion. Jones trains out of Austin, Texas, and was the head of B Team Jiu-Jitsu, departing in 2025 after the CJI2 event. In 2024 he founded the Craig Jones Invitational.

== Biography ==
Craig Jones was born on 17 July 1991 in Adelaide, South Australia. In 2006 Jones started training Brazilian jiu-jitsu (BJJ) at his cousin's academy. After getting his purple belt, Jones moved to Melbourne where he started training under Lachlan Giles. He stayed there until he was promoted to black belt by Giles while training at Absolute MMA Academy. Years later, Jones moved to New York in order to train under John Danaher and alongside Gordon Ryan. Jones moved with the rest of the team to Puerto Rico during the COVID-19 pandemic to continue training and preparing for competitions.

The team training under Danaher broke up on 26 July 2021, and the former members went their separate ways. Jones re-located to Austin, Texas, to create a new team, B Team Jiu-Jitsu, alongside Nicky Ryan, Nicky Rod and Ethan Crelinsten; where he still currently trains. He is the BJJ coach of current UFC Featherweight Champion, Alexander Volkanovski. He also served as the BJJ coach for Team Volkanovski on The Return of The Ultimate Fighter: Team Volkanovski vs. Team Ortega.

== Grappling career ==
In 2014 Jones was competing at purple belt and won gold at the NAGA World Championship and gold at the AFBJJ Pan Pacific Championship, a tournament held annually in Melbourne. The following year, in 2015 Jones qualified for the 2015 ADCC World Championships, a submission grappling tournament held every 2 years and often referred to as the "Olympics of grappling", after winning the ADCC Asia and Oceania Trials in the -88 kilograms (194 lb) division. Jones lost the ADCC World Championship in the first round by submission to Romulo Barral, but won the IBJJF World No-Gi Championships in the purple belt division, making him the first Australian male to win an IBJJF world championship. A year later in 2016, Jones won bronze at the Abu Dhabi World Professional Jiu-Jitsu Championship in the brown belt division. In 2016 Jones was promoted to black belt by Giles while training at Absolute MMA Academy.

=== Black belt career ===
In 2017 Jones qualified again for the ADCC World Championship, this time during the Championship Jones submitted 5x Black Belt World Champion Leandro Lo, Unity BJJ coach Murilo Santana and Chael Sonnen before losing the semi-final to Keenan Cornelius and the 3rd place to Alexandre Ribeiro. In 2019 Jones won silver at the ADCC Submission Fighting World Championship.

Jones faced UFC veteran Donald Cerrone in a Combat Jiu-Jitsu superfight at the Combat Jiu-Jitsu Featherweight World Championships on 19 December 2021, and submitted him with a rear-naked choke in regulation time. In 2022, Jones returned to ADCC and won silver again after moving to the -99 kg division, defeating 3 x World Champion Nicholas Meregali in the semi-final, before losing via points (4-0) to Kaynan Duarte.

==== 2023 ====
Jones was booked to compete in a rematch against Meregali at Who's Number One on 25 February 2023, but had to withdraw and the match was postponed. Jones competed against Felipe Pena in the main event of UFC Fight Pass Invitational 4 on 29 June 2023. He won in overtime, by fastest escape. He then competed at Quintet 4 on 10 September 2023, as part of The B-Team Bulls. Jones registered two draws and two wins to help his team win the tournament.

Jones was scheduled to compete against Luke Rockhold at Israel Fight Night on 21 September 2023. The match was cancelled for undisclosed reasons. Jones then competed against Gerald Meerschaert in the main event of Polaris 26 on 4 November 2023. He won the match by submission with a rear-naked choke.

Jones won 'Personality of the Year' and 'Submission of the Year' for a Toehold he submitted Richie Martinez with at Quintet 4 at the JitsMagazine BJJ Awards 2023.

==== 2024 ====
Jones competed against Philip Rowe in the main event of Karate Combat's Pit Submission Series 2 on February 23, 2024. He submitted Rowe with a flying triangle choke and won the match.

He also competed against Rafael Lovato Jr. in the main event of UFC Fight Pass Invitational 6 on March 3, 2024. Jones won the match by submission.

Jones competed against Rinat Fakhretdinov at Karate Combat's Pit Submission Series 4 on April 20, 2024. He won the match by submission with a triangle choke.

Jones announced on an episode of the Joe Rogan Experience that he would be competing against Gabi Garcia in an intergender superfight at The Craig Jones Invitational on August 16–17, 2024. Jones won the match by submission with a rear-naked choke.

Jones later announced in an interview with Ariel Helwani that he was going to return to competition in the gi.

==== 2025 ====
Jones was set to compete against Gable Steveson in a superfight at the Craig Jones Invitational 2 on August 31, 2025 He later announced that this would be his final match, and that he was retiring from the sport. However, Steveson pulled out of the match on August 25, 2025 due to turf toe. Steveson later claimed he withdrew from the event after Jones asked him to throw their superfight, which Jones denied.

Steveson was replaced by former two-time UFC Middleweight title and one-time UFC Light Heavyweight title challenger, Chael Sonnen. This was a rematch, as the two previously met in 2017 as a part of that year's ADCC Absolute Division bracket, with Jones submitting Sonnen via heel hook in just under two minutes. Jones submitted Sonnen via buggy choke in 30 seconds, before rematching him minutes later, submitting him via buggy choke once again, this time in 1 minute and 15 seconds.

== Instructor career ==
Jones was the BJJ trainer of UFC fighters Alexander Volkanovski and Jack Della Maddalena for their championship fights against Islam Makhachev and Belal Muhammad.

== The Craig Jones Invitational ==
In 2024, Jones announced that he had secured a total of $3,000,000 in funding to host his own tournament. He confirmed that there would be two divisions at under and over 80 kg, with $10,001 for each competitor to show and $1,000,000 as the grand prize for each winner. It was also announced that the event would take place across August 16 and 17, 2024, in direct competition with the 2024 ADCC World Championship.

After the success of the first edition, Jones announced that CJI 2 would take place in August 2025. At CJI 2 he defeated Chael Sonnen.

== Grappling competitive summary ==
Jones' main accomplishments as black belt:

- Polaris 17 Middleweight (Note: Polaris Middleweight 83.9 kg (185 lb)) Champion (2021)
- Polaris 10 Middleweight Champion (2019)
- Polaris 8 Light Heavyweight (Note: Polaris Light Heavyweight 93 kg (205 lb)) Champion (2018)
- Polaris 6 Middleweight Champion (2018)
- Submission Underground Absolute Champion (2019)
- 2nd place ADCC Submission Fighting World Championship (2019/2022)
- 3rd Place EBI 11 Invitational (2017)
- 3rd place Kasai 2 185 lbs Grand Prix (2018)
- 3rd place Kasai 5 205 lbs Grand Prix (2019)

Main accomplishments in coloured belts:

- IBJJF World Championship NoGi (2015 purple)
- AFBJJ Pan Pacific Championship (2014 (Note: Weight and Absolute) purple)
- ADCC Asian & Oceania World Trials (2014 / 2016)
- NAGA World Championship (2014 purple)
- 3rd place UAEJJF Abu Dhabi Pro (2016 brown)

== Personal life ==
Jones has also completed a Bachelor's degree in Behavioural Science (Psychology). In 2020, Jones moved to Puerto Rico with Gordon Ryan and other members of the Danaher Death Squad. In 2021, he relocated to Austin, Texas to found B Team Jiu-Jitsu.

Jones operates an OnlyFans account, and has made appearances on several popular podcasts like Lex Fridman, The Joe Rogan Experience and InfoWars with Alex Jones.

Jones' older brother, Adam Jones, is also a black belt in Brazilian jiu jitsu and is the jiu jitsu coach at Freestyle MMA in Windang, New South Wales and operates Scrap Mats, a jiu jitsu fight promotion.

== Instructor lineage ==
Mitsuyo Maeda → Carlos Gracie → Hélio Gracie → Carlos Gracie Jr. → Jean Jacques Machado / Rigan Machado → John Will → John Simon → Lachlan Giles → Craig Jones
