= Nick Rodriguez =

American grappler (born 1996)

- Born: Nicholas Pete Rodriguez; August 30, 1996 (age 30)
- Other names: Nicky Rod; The Black Belt Slayer
- Height: 6 ft 3 in (191 cm)
- Weight: 220 lb (100 kg; 15 st 10 lb)
- Team: Danaher Death Squad (former); B Team Jiu Jitsu
- Rank: Black belt in BJJ (Note: under Craig Jones, Ethan Crelinsten and Nicky Ryan)
- Wrestling: NCAA Division III wrestling

Other information
- Notable relatives: Jay Rodriguez (brother)

Nicholas Pete Rodriguez (born August 30, 1996) is an American professional submission grappler and Brazilian jiu-jitsu (BJJ) black belt, commonly known as Nicky Rod.

A former amateur wrestler, Rodriguez won in 2018 the ADCC West Coast Trials to qualify for the 2019 ADCC Submission Fighting World Championships, where he won silver, while still a BJJ blue belt. He won silver again at the 2022 ADCC World.

== Early life and education ==
Nicholas Pete Rodriguez was born on August 30, 1996. He was raised in Clayton, New Jersey and attended Clayton High School. Rodriguez began wrestling in sixth grade.

== Amateur wrestling career ==
=== High school career ===
Rodriguez was a wrestler in high school. He qualified for the NJSIAA championships as a senior but did not place.

=== Collegiate career ===
After high school, Rodriguez attended Ferrum College, that has an NCAA Division III wrestling program. In between his last match as a high school wrestler and his first match as a collegiate wrestler, he gained 50 pounds, going from 170 to 220 pounds. Rodriguez attended college for one year, during which he placed fourth at the East Regionals and had a record of 23 wins and 4 losses. After college, he decided to pursue a modeling career with Wilhelmina Models.

=== Post-collegiate career ===
Rodriguez returned to wrestling on October 5, 2019, when he faced that year's USA Wrestling World Team Member Pat Downey in a super-fight under freestyle rules at Who's Number One. He lost the match by technical fall.

== Professional grappling career ==
=== 2018 ===
In 2018, Rodriguez was persuaded by a friend to attend his first jiu-jitsu class to stay fit. After two weeks of training, he attended his first submission wrestling competition and went on to win the advanced 230 pounds and absolute brackets. A few months later, he moved to Renzo Gracie Academy with coach John Danaher, who awarded him his blue belt later on.

After a failed attempt to qualify for the ADCCs, Rodriguez competed at the IBJJF World Championship in the blue belt division. He defeated all three of his opponents to win the championship.

=== 2019 ===
As a blue belt, Rodriguez qualified for the 2019 ADCC World Championships after winning the North American trials. He defeated three notable jiu-jitsu black belts in Mahamed Aly, Orlando Sanchez, and Cyborg Abreu to make it to the finals, where he lost to black belt IBJJF World Champion Kaynan Duarte on points, earning him 2nd place in the tournament. He was promoted to purple belt on the ADCC podium by his coach Jay Regalbuto. Rodriguez became known by the nickname "Black Belt Slayer".

He competed against Duarte in a rematch at Fight 2 Win, which he lost. He also competed at the BJJ Fanatics Grand Prix.

=== 2020 ===
After his bronze medal finish at the KASAI Pro 7, Rodriguez was scheduled to face 2019 US World Team Member Pat Downey at Third Coast Grappling IV in a special ruleset match on March 14. However, the event was cancelled due to the COVID-19 pandemic.

He then competed at Third Coast Grappling: Kumite IV on July 11. He was eliminated in the first round.

In December, 2020, Rodriguez moved to Puerto Rico with the rest of his teammates to continue training under John Danaher.

=== 2021 ===
Rodriguez competed against Yuri Simões in the co-main event of Who's Number One on March 26, 2021. Rodriguez won the match by decision. He was then invited to compete in an absolute grand prix at Third Coast Grappling 6 on April 3, 2021. Rodriguez defeated Pedro Marinho by decision in the opening round before losing a decision to Victor Hugo in the semi-final. In July, news broke that the Danaher Death Squad were splitting up. Rodriguez elected to continue training with Craig Jones, Ethan Crelinsten, and Nicky Ryan. The four grapplers opened up a new gym in Austin, Texas under the name B Team Jiu Jitsu in August, 2021. Shortly afterward, Rodriguez was invited to compete at the 2022 ADCC World Championship. On December 30, 2021, Rodriguez competed against UFC veteran Steve Mowry at Fury Pro Grappling 3 and submitted him with a rear-naked choke at 5:30.

=== 2022 ===
Rodriguez faced Elder Cruz at Who's Number One: Jones v Marinho on January 21, 2022, and lost the match by split decision. Shortly after this, Rodriguez was promoted to brown belt in BJJ. Rodriguez competed in the over 99 kg division of ADCC 2022, defeating Damon Ramos on points and submitting John Hansen with a rear-naked choke on the first day. On the second day he defeated Felipe Pena on points in the semi-final, but was submitted by Gordon Ryan in the final and came away with a silver medal. He was then invited to compete at EBI 20: The Absolutes on October 23, 2021. Rodriguez won the tournament by defeating Ezeqiual Zurita, Luke Griffith, Austin Baker, and Kyle Boehm in one night. On December 15, 2022, Rodriguez was scheduled to compete in another absolute tournament at UFC Fight Pass Invitational 3. However, Vinny Magalhães withdrew from the main event match against Gordon Ryan and Rodriguez agreed to step in to replace him instead. Neither man could finish the fight in regulation time and the match went to EBI overtime, where Gordon Ryan won by fastest escape time. Ryan would accuse Rodriguez of 'greasing' during their match. Rodriguez denied that accusation on an episode Mark Bell's Power Project Podcast in February 2023.

=== 2023 ===
Rodriguez stepped in on two days' notice to replace Gordon Ryan against Felipe Pena in the main event of Who's Number One on February 25, 2023. He lost the match by unanimous decision. Rodriguez was then invited to compete in an openweight tournament at UFC Fight Pass Invitational 4 on June 29, 2023. He defeated Roberto Jimenez, Vagner Rocha, and Dan Manasoiu to win the tournament. Rodriguez then competed at Quintet 4 on September 10, 2023 as part of The B-Team Bulls. Rodriguez drew both of his matches but his team won the tournament. Rodriguez was scheduled to compete against 3 competitors: Jake Lowry, Cody Gamble, and Zack Humbertson, in a series of matches at Sprawl in the Burgh 2 on October 20, 2023. He won all three. Rodriguez then competed against Yuri Simões at UFC Fight Pass Invitational 5 on December 10, 2023. He won the match on points.

=== 2024 ===
Rodriguez competed against Victor Hugo in the main event of Who's Number One 22 on February 9, 2024. He lost the match by decision. Rodriguez competed against Roberto Jimenez in the co-main event of UFC Fight Pass Invitational 6 on March 3, 2024. He won the match on points. Rodriguez competed against Mason Fowler in the main event of UFC Fight Pass Invitational 7 on May 15, 2024. He won the match on points. Rodriguez was invited to compete in the over 99 kg division of the 2024 ADCC World Championship on August 17–18, 2024. However, he later withdrew from the event in order to compete in the over 80 kg division of the Craig Jones Invitational on August 16–17, 2024 instead. Rodriguez submitted Max Gimenis, Owen Livesey, Adam Bradley, and Fellipe Andrew to win the tournament.

Rodriguez faced Michael Pixley on October 10, 2024 in the main event of the UFC Fight Pass Invitational 8. He won the match by submission.

=== 2025 ===
Rodriguez competed against Victor Hugo in the main event of UFC Fight Pass Invitational 10 on March 6, 2025. He lost the match by submission.

Rodriguez next faced Kaynan Duarte in the main event of Who’s Number One 27 on April 18, 2025. He won the match by decision.

== Professional wrestling career ==
On April 24, 2023, Rodriguez revealed that he had attended tryouts for WWE, an American professional wrestling promotion. While it was initially reported that he been accepted to the promotion along with several other athletes who attended the tryouts, WWE ultimately passed on signing Rodriguez.

== Personal life ==
Rodriguez's younger brother Jacob, known as Jay or J-Rod, is a former B-Team Jiu Jitsu competitor. A former two-time New Jersey regional champion in wrestling, he won the 2022 ADCC North American West Coast Trials in the -88 kg division.

== Championships and accomplishments ==
Main Achievements

- ADCC US West Coast Trials champion (2019)
- EBI 20: The Absolute Champion (2022)
- Grappling Industries: Wildwook (Advanced Absolute) (2018)
- Grappling Industries: Wildwook (Advanced 230 lbs) (2018)
- 2nd place ADCC World Championships (2019 / 2022)
- 3rd place Kasai 7 HW Grand Prix (2020)
- 3rd place ADCC US East Coast Trials (2018)
- 3rd place Third Coast Grappling 6 Grand Prix (2021)
- 3rd place KASAI Pro 7 (+99 kg) (2020)

Main Achievements (Colored Belts)

- IBJJF World Championships No-Gi champion (2018 blue belt)
- High Rollerz Open: Pittsburgh (blue belt Absolute)

== Grappling record ==
42 Matches, 37 Wins (17 Submissions), 7 Losses (1 Submission), 2 Draws
| Result | Rec. | Opponent | Method | Event | Division | Type | Year | Location |
2021 3CG Grand Prix DNP at +99 kg
| Loss | 37–7–2 | (Brazil) Victor Hugo | Referee Decision | 2021 Third Coast Grappling VI Grand Prix | +99 kg | Nogi | April 4, 2021 | (United States) Houston, TX |
| Win | 37–6–2 | (Brazil) Pedro Marinho | Referee Decision | 2021 Third Coast Grappling VI Grand Prix | +99 kg | Nogi | April 4, 2021 | (United States) Houston, TX |
| Win | 36–6–2 | (Brazil) Yuri Simões | Referee Decision | 2021 Who's Number One | +99 kg | Nogi | March 26, 2021 | (United States) Austin, TX |
| Loss | 35–6–2 | (Ecuador) Roberto Jimenez | Referee Decision | 2020 Third Coast Grappling: Kumite IV | +99 kg | Nogi | July 11, 2020 | (United States) Houston, TX |
2020 KASAI Pro 7 (bronze) at +99 kg
| Win | 35–5–2 | (United States) Kyle Boehm | Points (5–0) | 2020 KASAI Pro 7 | +99 kg | Nogi | February 1, 2020 | (United States) Dallas, TX |
| Win | 34–5–2 | (Brazil) Bruno Bastos | Submission (heel hook) | 2020 KASAI Pro 7 | +99 kg | Nogi | February 1, 2020 | (United States) Dallas, TX |
| Draw | 33–5–2 | (Brazil) Cyborg Abreu | Draw | 2020 KASAI Pro 7 | +99 kg | Nogi | February 1, 2020 | (United States) Dallas, TX |
| Draw | 33–5–1 | (Brazil) Vinny Magalhães | Draw | 2020 KASAI Pro 7 | +99 kg | Nogi | February 1, 2020 | (United States) Dallas, TX |
| Loss | 33–5 | (Brazil) Victor Hugo | Referee Decision | Fight 2 Win 135 | +99 kg | Nogi | January 18, 2020 | (United States) California, CA |
| Win | 33–4 | (United States) Luke Rockhold | Referee Decision | Polaris 12 | 104.3 kg | Nogi | November 30, 2019 | (Wales) Newport, WA |
2019 BJJ Fanatics Grand Prix at +99 kg
| Loss | 32–4 | (Brazil) Lucas Barbosa | Overtime (riding time) | 2019 BJJ Fanatics Submission Only Grand Prix | +99 kg | Nogi | November 15, 2019 | (United States) Beverly, MA |
| Win | 32–3 | (Brazil) Victor Silverio | Overtime (rear–naked choke) | 2019 BJJ Fanatics Submission Only Grand Prix | +99 kg | Nogi | November 15, 2019 | (United States) Beverly, MA |
| Loss | 31–3 | (Brazil) Kaynan Duarte | Submission (heel hook) | Fight 2 Win 128 | +99 kg | Nogi | October 19, 2019 | (United States) Philadelphia, PA |
2019 ADCC World Championship (silver) at +99 kg
| Loss | 31–2 | (Brazil) Kaynan Duarte | Points (0–3) | 2019 ADCC Submission Wrestling World Championships | +99 kg | Nogi | September 29, 2019 | (United States) Anaheim, CA |
| Win | 31–1 | (Brazil) Cyborg Abreu | Referee Decision | 2019 ADCC Submission Wrestling World Championships | +99 kg | Nogi | September 29, 2019 | (United States) Anaheim, CA |
| Win | 30–1 | (United States) Orlando Sanchez | Referee Decision | 2019 ADCC Submission Wrestling World Championships | +99 kg | Nogi | September 29, 2019 | (United States) Anaheim, CA |
| Win | 29–1 | (Brazil) Mahamed Aly | Referee Decision | 2019 ADCC Submission Wrestling World Championships | +99 kg | Nogi | September 29, 2019 | (United States) Anaheim, CA |
| Win | 28–1 | (United States) Jason Reyes | Points (15–0) | 2019 JitzKing Tampa | +99 kg | Nogi | July 6, 2019 | (United States) Tampa, FL |
| Win | 27–1 | (United States) Quentin Rosenzweig | Submission (rear–naked choke) | Sub Stars: Nicky Rod Challenge | Absolute | Nogi | June 19, 2019 | (United States) Miami, FL |
| Win | 26–1 | (Wales) Ashley Amos | Submission (rear–naked choke) | Polaris 10 | +105 kg | Nogi | May 25, 2019 | (United Kingdom) Poole, UK |
| Win | 25–1 | (United States) Walker Madden | Referee Decision | Fight 2 Win 108 | 240 lbs | Nogi | April 12, 2019 | (United States) Philadelphia, PA |
| Win | 24–1 | (United States) Tyler King | Referee Decision | Fight 2 Win 107 | 240 lbs | Nogi | April 5, 2019 | (United States) Tyngsborough, MA |
2019 High Rollerz Open: Pittsburgh (gold) at Absolute
| Win | 23–1 | (United States) Caleb Crump | Submission | High Rollerz Open: Pittsburgh | Absolute | Nogi (blue) | March 30, 2019 | (United States) Cheswick, PA |
| Win | 22–1 | (United States) Jeric Fry | Submission | High Rollerz Open: Pittsburgh | Absolute | Nogi (blue) | March 30, 2019 | (United States) Cheswick, PA |
| Win | 21–1 | (United States) Brandon Moran | Disqualification | High Rollerz Open: Pittsburgh | Absolute | Nogi (blue) | March 30, 2019 | (United States) Cheswick, PA |
| Win | 20–1 | (United States) Joshua Lorton | Submission | High Rollerz Open: Pittsburgh | Absolute | Nogi (blue) | March 30, 2019 | (United States) Cheswick, PA |
2019 ADCC North American Trials (gold) at +99 kg
| Win | 19–1 | (United States) John Hansen | Submission (rear–naked choke) | 2019 ADCC North American Trials | +99 kg | Nogi | February 9, 2019 | (United States) Burbank, CA |
| Win | 18–1 | (United States) Casey Hellenberg | Points (6–0) | 2019 ADCC North American Trials | +99 kg | Nogi | February 9, 2019 | (United States) Burbank, CA |
| Win | 17–1 | (United States) James Friedrich | Submission | 2019 ADCC North American Trials | +99 kg | Nogi | February 9, 2019 | (United States) Burbank, CA |
| Win | 16–1 | (United States) Fernando Iraheta | Submission (kimura) | 2019 ADCC North American Trials | +99 kg | Nogi | February 9, 2019 | (United States) Burbank, CA |
| Win | 15–1 | (United States) Michael Egley | Points (2–0) | 2019 ADCC North American Trials | +99 kg | Nogi | February 9, 2019 | (United States) Burbank, CA |
2018 IBJJF World Nogi Championships (gold) at +99 kg
| Win | 14–1 | (United States) Jureall Simmons | Submission (kimura) | 2018 World IBJJF Jiu-Jitsu No-Gi Championship | +97 kg | Nogi (blue) | December 14, 2018 | (United States) Anaheim, CA |
| Win | 13–1 | (Brazil) Erick Hastings | Submission (armbar) | 2018 World IBJJF Jiu-Jitsu No-Gi Championship | +97 kg | Nogi (blue) | December 14, 2018 | (United States) Anaheim, CA |
| Win | 12–1 | (Brazil) William Matheus | Submission (arm–triangle choke) | 2018 World IBJJF Jiu-Jitsu No-Gi Championship | +97 kg | Nogi (blue) | December 14, 2018 | (United States) Anaheim, CA |
2018 ADCC North American Trials (bronze) at +99 kg
| Win | 11–1 | (United States) Andrew Tevay | Points (2–0) | 2018 ADCC North American Trials | +99 kg | Nogi | November 3, 2018 | (United States) Bayville, NJ |
| Loss | 10–1 | (United States) Hudson Taylor | Points (0–5) | 2018 ADCC North American Trials | +99 kg | Nogi | November 3, 2018 | (United States) Bayville, NJ |
| Win | 10–0 | (United States) Billy Brown | Submission (rear–naked choke) | 2018 ADCC North American Trials | +99 kg | Nogi | November 3, 2018 | (United States) Bayville, NJ |
| Win | 9–0 | (United States) Dylan Rankin | Submission (kimura) | 2018 ADCC North American Trials | +99 kg | Nogi | November 3, 2018 | (United States) Bayville, NJ |
| Win | 8–0 | (United States) Dylan Rankin | Submission (kimura) | 2018 RISE Submission Invitational 5 | 215 lbs | Nogi | September 29, 2018 | (United States) Long Island, NY |
2018 Grappling Industries: Wildwook (gold) at +99 kg & Absolute
| Win | 7–0 | (United States) Joe Baik | Points (12–0) | Grappling Industries: Wildwood | Absolute | Nogi | June 2, 2018 | (United States) Wildwood, NJ |
| Win | 6–0 | (United States) Steven Tongur | Points (9–0) | Grappling Industries: Wildwood | Absolute | Nogi | June 2, 2018 | (United States) Wildwood, NJ |
| Win | 5–0 | (Israel) Gal Telem Goudsmit | Submission | Grappling Industries: Wildwood | Absolute | Nogi | June 2, 2018 | (United States) Wildwood, NJ |
| Win | 4–0 | (United States) Nick Van Wattingen | Submission | Grappling Industries: Wildwood | +99 kg | Nogi | June 2, 2018 | (United States) Wildwood, NJ |
| Win | 3–0 | (United States) Peter Mattoccia | Points (16–0) | Grappling Industries: Wildwood | +99 kg | Nogi | June 2, 2018 | (United States) Wildwood, NJ |
| Win | 2–0 | (United States) Chris Baldino | Submission | Grappling Industries: Wildwood | +99 kg | Nogi | June 2, 2018 | (United States) Wildwood, NJ |
| Win | 1–0 | (United States) Eric Silverman | Points (2–0) | Grappling Industries: Wildwood | +99 kg | Nogi | June 2, 2018 | (United States) Wildwood, NJ |
