= Kaynan Duarte =

Brazilian jiu-jitsu practitioner from Brazil

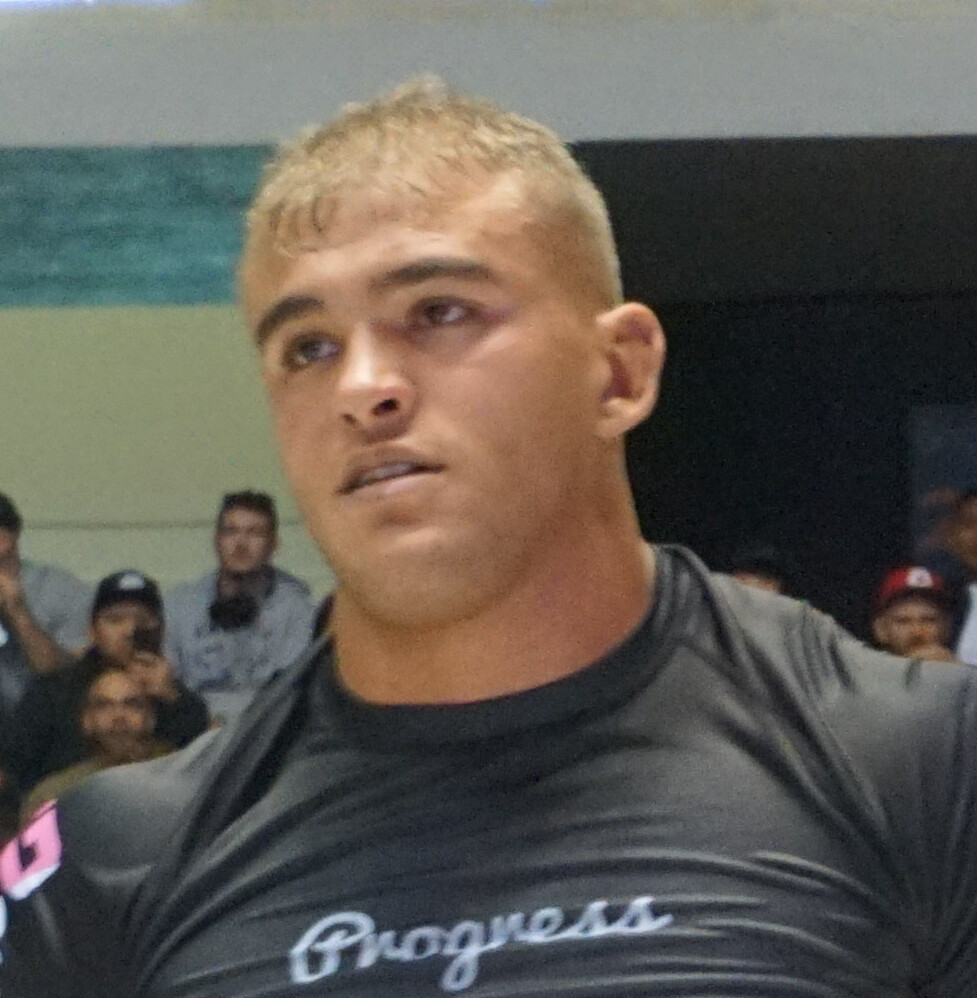
- Duarte in 2019
- Born: Kaynan Casemiro Duarte; 24 January 1998 (age 28); Pederneiras, São Paulo, Brazil
- Nickname: Thanos
- Height: 6 ft 1 in (1.85 m)
- Weight: 94.3 kg (208 lb; 14 st 12 lb)
- Division: Heavyweight
- Team: Atos Jiu-Jitsu
- Trainer: André Galvão
- Rank: BJJ black belt (under André Galvão)

Kaynan Casemiro Duarte (born 24 January 1998) is a Brazilian submission grappler and Brazilian jiu-jitsu (BJJ) black belt competitor. Duarte is a four-time champion at the ADCC Submission Fighting World Championship and two-time champion at the World IBJJF Jiu-Jitsu Championship in the Heavyweight division.

== Background ==
Duarte was born on 24 January 1998, in Pederneiras, São Paulo, Brazil.

During his pre-teens, Duarte developed an interest in martial arts and started attending Judo classes. From there and through his cousin he learnt about Brazilian jiu-jitsu and transitioned to the sport.

== Early career ==
Duarte's first instructor was José Luis and Duarte moved to various places to train with different people to expand his knowledge on the sport. During his visits to São Paulo, he met Paulo Ledesma who was associated with Atos Jiu-Jitsu. Eventually in 2016, Duarte moved to San Diego, California, to join Atos Jiu-Jitsu under André Galvão. Galvão who served as Duarte's coach promoted Duarte to Black Belt in 2018 after Duarte won the 2018 World IBJJF Jiu-Jitsu Championship in both the Brown Belt heavyweight and absolute divisions. Duarte received his black belt only one year after his promotion to brown belt.

== Black belt career ==
=== 2019-2020 ===
In the 2019 ADCC World Championship, Duarte defeated Eldar Rafigaev, Yuri Simoes, Marcus Almeida and Nick Rodriguez to become champion in the heavyweight division. Duarte also competed in the absolute division but suffered an upset loss in the first round against welterweight Lachlan Giles after being submitted by a Heel Hook.

Duarte competed against Roberto 'Cyborg' Abreu in the main event of BJJ Bet on 6 September 2020, losing by submission. Duarte then competed in the main event of Who's Number One against Rodolfo Vieira on 11 December 2020. He won the match by submission with a rear-naked choke.

=== 2021-2022 ===
Duarte was invited to compete in a tournament at Third Coast Grappling 6 on 3 April 2021. Duarte defeated Mason Fowler, Aaron 'Tex' Johnson, and Victor Hugo to win the tournament. He then represented ATOS at Subversiv 5 on 1 May 2021. He defeated both of his opponents and helped ATOS to win the tournament. He was then invited to compete in the main event of the inaugural Road to ADCC event against Matheus Diniz. Duarte won the match by submission, with a heel hook.

Duarte suffered an upset in the Who's Number One championships on 21 September 2021. He was invited to compete in the heavyweight division and entered as a heavy favorite, he defeated Kyle Boehm and Giancarlo Bodoni. In the final he faced unranked Tim Spriggs and was submitted by a heel hook.

Duarte was invited to compete in the 2022 ADCC World Championship on 17–18 September 2022. Duarte won his second championship by defeating Owen Livesey, Elder Cruz, Rafael Lovato Jr. and Craig Jones to become champion in the light heavyweight division.

=== 2023 ===
On 29 January 2023, Duarte won gold medals in both the super-heavyweight division and the absolute division of the 2023 IBJJF European Championship. Duarte was then invited to compete in the BJJ Stars 10 Absolute Grand prix on 22 April 2023. Duarte won his first match against Vinicius Liberati by submission but was disqualified in his quarter-final match against Micael Galvão after reaping his opponent's knee.

Duarte competed in the IBJJF World Championship 2023 on 3 and 4 June 2023 and won a silver medal in the super-heavyweight division and a bronze medal in the absolute division. Duarte competed in the main event of Who's Number One 19 against Nicholas Meregali in the fifth match between them on 10 August 2023. He lost the match by submission.

Duarte was invited to compete in the IBJJF Absolute Grand Prix 2023 for the grand prize of $40,000 on 1 September 2023. He later withdrew from the event and was replaced by Paulo Merlin. Duarte competed in an 8-man absolute grand prix tournament at Polaris 25 on 30 September 2023. He won two matches by submission and won by decision to win the tournament.

=== 2024 ===
Duarte competed in the IBJJF No Gi Absolute Grand Prix on February 29, 2024. Duarte beat all three of his opponents and won the tournament.

Duarte competed against Pouya Rahmani at Pit Submission Series 4 on April 20, 2024. He lost the match by unanimous decision.

Duarte competed against Luke Griffith in the co-main event of UFC Fight Pass Invitational 7 on May 15, 2024. He lost the match by submission.

Duarte represented Team Kasai in the over 91 kg division at the AIGA Champions League Brazil Qualifier 2024 on May 23–25. He did not compete in the qualifying round but Team Kasai won the tournament.

Duarte received an invite to compete in the under 99 kg division of the 2024 ADCC World Championship on August 17–18, 2024. He submitted Daniel Schuardt, Declan Moody, and Roberto Abreu to make it to the finals, where he submitted Rafael Lovato Jr to win the 99 kg Championship. He also entered the absolute division where he beat Dante Leon on points and submitted Diego 'Pato' Oliveira, Declan Moody, and Roberto 'Cyborg' Abreu to win the absolute title. He won ‘Best Athlete’ at the 2024 ADCC World Championship as a result.

Duarte competed against Roberto Jimenez in the main event of Who’s Number One 25 on December 4, 2024. He won the match by decision.

=== 2025 ===
Duarte then faced Nick Rodriguez in the main event of Who’s Number One 27 on April 18, 2025. He lost the match by decision.

Duarte represented Team Kasai at the AIGA Champions League finals 2025, going 2-1 as Team Kasai won the event.

== Controversies ==
On 7 February 2020, the United States Anti-Doping Agency announced Duarte had tested positive for Ostarine following a post-match drug test at 2019 World IBJJF Jiu-Jitsu Championship. Duarte who was champion in heavyweight division for that year was stripped of his gold medal and banned from competing in IBJJF events for one year. Duarte claimed the intake of Ostarine was not intentional.

== Competitive summary ==
Main Achievements:

As black belt:

- ADCC Submission Fighting World Championship (Champion in 2019 and 2022)
- Best grappler at 2024 ADCC World Championship
- World IBJJF Jiu-Jitsu Championship (Champion (heavyweight) and Third place (absolute) in 2021, Champion in 2022)
- World IBJJF Jiu-Jitsu No-Gi Championship (Champion in 2018)
- Pan IBJJF Jiu-Jitsu Championship (Champion in 2019)
- Pan IBJJF Jiu-Jitsu No-Gi Championship (Champion (super heavyweight and absolute) in 2020, Second place (absolute) and Third place (super heavyweight) in 2018)
- European IBJJF Jiu-Jitsu Championship (Champion (heavyweight) and Third place (Absolute) in 2019)
- Abu Dhabi World Professional Jiu-Jitsu Championship (Champion 2019)
- Who's Number One (Second place in 2021)

Main Achievements:

In colored belts:

- World IBJJF Jiu-Jitsu Championship (Champion in 2017 (purple) and 2018 (brown heavyweight and absolute))
- World IBJJF Jiu-Jitsu No-Gi Championship (Champion in 2017 (purple) and 2018 (brown))
- Pan IBJJF Jiu-Jitsu Championship (Champion in 2017 (purple) and 2018 (brown))
- European IBJJF Jiu-Jitsu Championship (Champion (brown absolute) and Second Place (brown heavyweight) in 2018)

== Instructor lineage ==
Mitsuyo "Count Koma" Maeda → Carlos Gracie, Sr. → Helio Gracie → Rolls Gracie → Romero "Jacare" Cavalcanti → Alexandre Paiva → Fernando "Tererê" Augusto → André Galvao → Kaynan Duarte

== See also ==
- List of Brazilian Jiu-Jitsu practitioners
