= UFC Fight Pass =

Subscription streaming service

- Broadcast area: Most countries worldwide, except for Hispanic America and Brazil.
- Headquarters: Las Vegas, Nevada, U.S.

Programming
- Language: English
- Picture format: 1080p, 4K for UFC 200

Ownership
- Owner: TKO Group Holdings (Endeavor)

History
- Launched: December 28, 2013; Australia, Canada, New Zealand, and United States; March 6, 2014; More than 200 countries and territories.

Links
- Website: www.ufcfightpass.com

UFC Fight Pass is an American subscription-based video streaming service owned by the UFC's parent company, TKO Group Holdings, that launched in December 2013.

== History ==
Fight Pass showcases live and on-demand mixed martial arts, submission grappling, kickboxing, boxing and Thai boxing events. In addition to UFC events (with their flagship pay-per-view events appearing on the service around a month after their initial broadcasts), Fight Pass also includes content from the libraries of PRIDE FC, World Extreme Cagefighting, Strikeforce, Affliction Entertainment, World Fighting Alliance, EliteXC, King of the Cage, Pancrase, Cage Warriors, Shooto and UCMMA.

Yahoo Sports created the first iteration of a global, digital UFC Pay Per View product in 2007, offering dozens of UFC PPVs through 2014. In September 2014, Invicta FC began live-streaming events on its first incarnation of Fight Pass. In 2015, Yahoo Sports executive, Eric Winter, was recruited to become Senior Vice President & General Manager, to oversee the digital experiences for UFC. In February 2016, it was announced Fight Pass would begin streaming kickboxing promotions Glory and K-1, and the Eddie Bravo Invitational submission grappling tournaments.

On December 5, 2019, UFC announced an upgrade which included 1080p video, improved search and multi view for desktop. UFC president Dana White said "The redesigned Fight Pass offers upgrades like 1080p video, multi-view for desktop, improved search, and coming early next year, ‘Downloads to Go,’ so you can watch Fight Pass content without an internet connection. Add in the world's largest fight library with 17,000 fights, every UFC fight ever, and over 1,000 hours of live combat sports, and Fight Pass continues to be a must-have streaming service for combat sports fans". Content included alongside live events and the fight library includes shows such as The Ultimate Fighter, Unleashed, Dana White's Contender Series, Unfiltered, Connected and the popular long running show UFC Now.

On July 22, 2020, it was announced that UFC had rolled out their Fight Pass service in Japan. Kevin Chang, senior vice president for UFC Asia said "Japan is a pioneer in the sport of MMA, with a fan base that is knowledgeable, sophisticated, and always hungry for more". The promotion had also introduced the service to other major territories in Asia, including China and India.

As of February 2021, Invicta FC was pulled from Fight Pass. As many broadcasters have chosen with the current decline of traditional TV Invicta opted to go down the Fight Network route where their events will now broadcast live in the United States and Canada similar to the WWE Network model where full live events is part of a subscription base price. Also in early 2021, Ultimate Warrior Challenge Mexico, the longest-running company in Mexico, signed a multi-fight deal with Fight Pass. In 2022, it was announced that UWC would renew its contract with the platform.

Although media subscription services tend to experience significant churn, UFC Fight Pass is believed to have approximately 250,000 subscribers globally, as of 2017. In 2020, it was noted that the service has continued to grow 28% year to date. General manager Crowley Sullivan said, "Even without live events for two months, UFC Fight Pass subscriptions are up 28% year-to-date and 23% year-over-year".

In June 2022, JCK MMA signed a multi-event agreement with Fight Pass. In August 2022, it was confirmed that UFC Fight Pass will be released in Brazil in 2023 after the UFC rights with Grupo Globo will expire on the same year. UFC Fight Pass was officially released in Brazil on January 1, 2023. In 2023, the ADCC Submission Fighting World Championship signed an exclusive multi-year streaming deal with UFC Fight Pass, leaving their previous broadcaster FloSports. That deal fell apart just four months later, and ADCC left UFC Fight Pass. On June 16, 2023, Submission Hunter Pro signed an exclusive contract with UFC Fight Pass to stream all of their events for the foreseeable future. In February 2024, LUX Fight League signed a multi-event agreement with the platform. The first event streamed on it was LUX 040.

In October 2025, it was announced that UFC Fight Pass will be discontinued in Brazil on January 1, 2026, after Paramount Skydance acquired the streaming rights to air all UFC events on Paramount+ in the country.

== Professional grappling events ==
=== UFC Fight Pass Invitational 1 ===
On December 16, 2021 UFC Fight Pass produced its first in-house event; UFC Fight Pass Invitational. The event saw four teams of four men compete in grappling matches, including Davi Ramos, James Krause, and Rafael Lovato Jr. The tournament was won by the team representing Legacy Fighting Alliance.

=== UFC Fight Pass Invitational 2 ===
The second UFC Fight Pass Invitational event took place on July 3, 2022 and featured a number of returning competitors along with debutants in another team tournament. This tournament was won by the team representing Anthony Pettis Fighting Championships.

=== UFC Fight Pass Invitational 3 ===
The third UFC Fight Pass Invitational event took place on December 15, 2022 and saw a slight change in format. This event featured an eight-man absolute tournament instead, featuring top grapplers like Nick Rodriguez, Mason Fowler, and Patrick Gaudio. The main event was scheduled to be a superfight between Gordon Ryan and Vinny Magalhães, but Magalhaes withdrew from the match days before the event and was replaced with Nick Rodriguez.

Mason Fowler won the absolute tournament and Gordon Ryan won the superfight.

=== UFC Fight Pass Invitational 4 ===
Dana White announced that the fourth UFC Fight Pass Invitational was scheduled to take place on June 29, 2023 and would be headlined by Craig Jones v Felipe Pena with Glover Teixeira v Anthony Smith serving as the co-main event. Nicholas Meregali and Roberto "Cyborg" Abreu were booked to compete against one another on the main card, while two-time NCAA champion Roman Bravo-Young was set to make his BJJ debut against UFC flyweight Alex Perez, and Helena Crevar was booked against Emily Fernandez. There was also an eight-man absolute tournament with a $30,000 grand prize, featuring Nick Rodriguez, Vagner Rocha, and Haisam Rida among others.

Crevar, Jones, Meregali, and Teixeira all won their respective matches. Nick Rodriguez won the absolute tournament, while Roman Bravo-Young and Alex Perez fought to a draw.

=== UFC Fight Pass Invitational 5 ===
Georges St-Pierre was booked to make his return to professional grappling at this event on December 14, 2023. It was later confirmed that his opponent was supposed to be Nick Diaz, but the match was postponed when both men were injured prior. The main event was later announced as Gordon Ryan vs. Mason Fowler, and the co-main event was announced as Nicholas Meregali vs. Felipe Pena. Nick Rodriguez vs. Yuri Simoes took place on the main card, as did Dan Manasoiu vs. Victor Hugo, Nicky Ryan vs. Jonnatas Gracie, and Luiza Monteiro vs. Elisabeth Clay. Gordon Ryan withdrew from the event on short notice and was replaced with Haisam Rida, which resulted in Meregali vs. Pena being promoted to main event status. Meregali, Rodriguez, Fowler, Gracie, Hugo, and Clay all won their respective matches.

=== UFC Fight Pass Invitational 6 ===
UFC Fight Pass Invitational 6 took place on March 2, 2024 with Craig Jones vs Rafael Lovato Jr. as the main event and Nick Rodriguez v Roberto Jimenez as the co-main event. Nicholas Meregali vs. Matheus Diniz was also later added to the card. Jones, Rodriguez, and Meregali all won their respective matches.
