= CJCK-FM =

Canadian First Nations community radio station in Quebec

Coordinates: 54°48′29″N 66°49′22″W

- Kawawachikamach, Quebec; Canada
- Frequency: 89.9 MHz

Programming
- Format: First Nations community radio

Ownership
- Owner: Naskapi Northern Wind Radio

History
- First air date: May 21, 1982

Technical information
- ERP: 1 watt
- HAAT: 12 metres (39 ft)

CJCK-FM is a First Nations community radio station that broadcasts at 89.9 FM in Kawawachikamach, Quebec, Canada.

Owned by Naskapi Northern Wind Radio, the station has been on the air since the early 1980s.
