= List of IBJJF Hall of Fame inductees =

List of Brazilian Jiu-Jitsu Hall of Fame inductees

List of competitors inducted into the Brazilian jiu-jitsu Hall of Fame by the International Brazilian Jiu-Jitsu Federation (IBJJF), for-profit company that hosts several of the biggest Brazilian jiu-jitsu tournaments in the world, oversees the Brazilian Jiu-Jitsu Hall of Fame. Athletes are inducted based on either achieving remarkable results throughout their competitive careers (at least 4 world titles) or making a significant and far-reaching impact on the sport and art of jiu-jitsu.

== Inductees ==
=== Female ===
- Luanna Alzuguir, (2014)
- Bianca Andrade, (2014)
- Gabi Garcia, (2014)
- Kyra Gracie, (2014)
- Beatriz Mesquita, (2022)
- Michelle Nicolini, (2014)
- Leticia Ribeiro, (2014)
- Hannette Staack, (2014)

=== Male ===
- Marcus Almeida, (2014)
- Romulo Barral, (2014)
- Romero Cavalcanti, (2016)
- Bernardo Faria, (2022)
- André Galvão, (2022)
- Marcelo Garcia, (2014)
- Carlos Gracie Jr., (2016)
- Carlson Gracie, (2016)
- Roger Gracie, (2014)
- Rolls Gracie, (2016)
- Royler Gracie, (2014)
- Fábio Gurgel, (2014)
- Lucas Lepri, (2022)
- Leandro Lo (2023)
- Rubens Charles Maciel, (2014)
- Roberto Magalhães, (2014)
- Bruno Malfacine, (2014)
- Guilherme Mendes, (2022)
- Rafael Mendes, (2022)
- Robson Moura, (2014)
- Alexandre Ribeiro, (2014)
- Saulo Ribeiro, (2014)
- Rodolfo Vieira, (2014)

== See also ==
- World Jiu-Jitsu Championship
