= IBJJF Grand Slam =

Brazilian jiu-jitsu term for winning all four major championships

The Grand Slam in Brazilian jiu-jitsu is the achievement of winning all four major IBJJF tournaments in a calendar year. The four Grand Slam tournaments are the World IBJJF Championship, the European IBJJF Championship, Pan IBJJF Championship and the CBJJ Brazilian National Championship. Winning all four tournaments within a single year is widely considered the most prestigious accomplishment in Brazilian jiu-jitsu competition.

== History ==
In the sport of Brazilian jiu-jitsu, the first Brazilian National Championship ("Brasileiro") started in 1994, the IBJJF World Brazilian Jiu-Jitsu Championship ("Worlds") was held in 1996, the Pan American Championship ("Pans") first took place in 1996 while the European Open Championship ("Euros") was inaugurated in 2004.

Euros, Pans, Brasileiros and Worlds are the four major and most renowned championships in Brazilian jiu-jitsu, they are part of a series of events known as the IBJJF Grand Slam.

The European Open is the first gi grand slam tournament of the year, the last edition took place in Paris, followed by Pans in California, the Brazilian Nationals in São Paulo and the World Championship in California. Being the reigning champion of all four competitions in a single year is regarded as the most prestigious accomplishment in competition (in either gi or no gi).

== Grand Slam tournaments champions ==
List of athletes who have completed the Grand Slam or the double Grand Slam.

Athlete	Year	Notes	Source
Pawel Jaworski	2026	First male to complete the No-Gi Grand Slam	
Zain A. Chaudhry	2025	won all four tournaments in the super-heavy and ultra-heavy divisions as a 16-year-old blue belt.	
Leon Davis	2024	won all four tournaments in the middleweight division	
Micael Galvão	2024	won all four tournaments in the lightweight division and won ADCC World that year.	
Mayssa Bastos	2022	won all four tournaments in the rooster and light featherweight divisions	
Gabi Pessanha	2022	won each of the four tournaments in both super heavyweight and absolute categories	
Gabi Pessanha	2018	At 17 years old, the only athlete to win a double grand slam at purple belt (double gold at all four majors) that year	
Claudia do Val	2018	won in three different weight classes	
Lucas Barbosa	2018		
Rafael Lovato	2007	First Grand Slam winner	
Rubens "Cobrinha" Charles	2017	also winning ADCC World that year.	
Tainan Dalpra	2021		
Tayane Porfirio	2015	double Grand Slam at purple belt	
Keenan Cornelius	2012	at purple belt, became the first person to win the double Grand Slam: winning weight and absolute in each of the four tournaments.	
Mica Galvao	2020	double Grand Slam as a 16-year-old blue belt.	
Lucas Pinheiro	2022	won Brazilian, European, Pan American, and World in No-Gi	
André Galvão	2003	first purple belt to complete the IBJJF Grand Slam (Note: At the time Worlds, Pan and Brasileiro)	
Diogo Reis	2019	Grand Slam as a Teen / Juvenile in his weight class and the absolute.	

== Other related concepts ==
=== Double Grand Slam ===
Achieving a double Grand Slam means winning double gold (both weight and open weight category) at all four championships.

=== Grand Slam Academy Rankings ===
==== 2016-2017 Grand Slam Academy Rankings ====
Rank	Academy Ranking
Rank	Team
1	Alliance
2	Gracie Humaita
3	Atos Jiu Jitsu

==== 2022-2023 Grand Slam Academy Rankings ====
Rank	Academy Ranking	
Rank	Team	Points
1	DreamArt	654
2	Alliance	631
3	Checkmat	493
4	Atos Jiu-Jitsu	493
5	GFTeam	438
6	Cicero Costha Internacional	340
7	Gracie Barra	189
8	Qatar BJJ / Vision Brasil	64
9	Unity Jiu-jitsu	12
9	Infight JJ	12
9	Team Lloyd Irvin	12
12	Nova União	9
13	Brasa CTA	4
13	Roger Gracie Academy	4
