= List of ADCC Hall of Fame inductees =

List of competitors inducted into the Abu Dhabi Combat Club (ADCC) Hall of Fame. The list consists of athletes who have made an outstanding contribution to the sport of submission wrestling throughout their participation at the ADCC Submission Fighting Championship, a submission grappling tournament held every 2 years and often referred to as the "Olympics of grappling".

== Inductees ==
=== Female ===
- Kyra Gracie, (2022)

=== Male ===
- Ricardo Arona, (2022)
- Braulio Estima, (2022)
- André Galvão, (2022)
- Marcelo Garcia, (2022)
- Renzo Gracie, (2022)
- Roger Gracie, (2022)
- Royler Gracie, (2022)
- Mark Kerr, (2022)
- Dean Lister, (2022)
- Rubens Charles Maciel, (2022)
- Rafael Mendes, (2022)
- Saulo Ribeiro, (2022)
- Mário Sperry, (2022)
- Baret Yoshida, (2022)
- Xande Ribeiro, (2024)
- Jean Jacques Machado, (2024)
- Ronaldo Souza, (2024)
- Fabrício Werdum, (2024)
- Vinny Magalhães, (2024)
- Orlando Sanchez, (2024)

== See also ==
- 2022 ADCC World Championship
