= Carla Akotirene =

Brazilian researcher into black feminism

- Born: Carla Adriana da Silva Santos; April 30, 1980 (age 46); Salvador, Bahia, Brazil

Education
- Education: Catholic University of Salvador; Federal University of Bahia

Philosophical work
- Region: Western philosophy
- Main interests: Black feminism; Gender studies
- Notable ideas: Intersectionality

Carla Adriana da Silva Santos, better known as Carla Akotirene (born 1980), is an activist, researcher, author and columnist on the topic of black feminism in Brazil. She is an assistant professor at the Federal University of Bahia (UFBA), and is frequently cited for her research on intersectionality.

== Education ==
Akotirene was born in Salvador, Bahia on 30 April 1980. She studied clinical pathology at the Anísio Teixeira Institute (IAT) between 1998 and 1999. At that time, she was involved in many activities related to racial and social equality, such as the Black Community Development Council, the Campaign Against the Genocide of Black Youth; conferences on racial equality, women's and youth policies; and research on deaths of young people in inpatient units. She created Opará Saberes, to contribute to the entry of black people into postgraduate studies at Brazilian public universities.

Between 2004 and 2008 Akotirene obtained a bachelor's degree in social work from the Catholic University of Salvador and between 2010 and 2012 she worked on a master's degree in feminist studies from the Federal University of Bahia, where she researched intersectionality in the women's penal complex of Salvador, while addressing the issue of women in the prison system. In her doctorate on gender studies, women and feminism at the same university between 2016 and 2022, Akotirene carried out a comparative study of racism and institutional sexism in male and female prisons, based on the intersectionality approach. Akotirene teaches at the Federal University of Bahia as an assistant professor.

== Awards and honours ==
In 2016, she was mentioned by the feminist collective Think Olga as one of the Inspiring Women of 2016. The list brings together the names of more than 200 women, groups and collectives whose contributions in 2016 "deserved to be recognized, valued and encouraged". In 2017, she was nominated by the philosopher Djamila Ribeiro to Trip Transformadores as one of the "seven women of action who help us rethink society".

In September 2018, Akotirene published her first book, "What is Intersectionality?". The publication was part of the Plural Feminisms collection, edited by Djamila Ribeiro. In the same year, she presented a conversation on plural feminisms at the Feira Literária das Periferias together with Joice Berth, Juliana Borges and Silvio Almeida. This literary fair brought together more than 80 authors from around the world. Also in 2018, she was one of the experts invited by UN Women to share her vision as a black expert on topics such as violence against black women; racism in cities; decent work and economic growth; and ways for Brazil to achieve the Sustainable Development Goals (SDGs).

In 2020, Vogue Brasil magazine published a list of ten fundamental works written by black women, which included her book "What is Intersectionality?". This was also included in the Brazilian edition of Glamour magazine, which recommended five theoretical books to understand the anti-racist struggle in Brazil. Since June 2020, Akotirene has been a columnist for Vogue Brasil. Also in 2020, the Salvador carnival block (group), Ilê Aiyê, which works to raise the consciousness of the Bahian black community, organised a special event in her honour, celebrating her fight for the rights of black women. In 2021, Carla Akotirene was one of the personalities named on the Bantumen Powerlist 100, which contains the "100 Most Influential Black Personalities in Lusofonia".

== Main ideas ==
According to Akotirene, intersectionality is a methodological way of thinking about how women suffer from overlapping or intersecting social identities. When it comes to black women, intersectionality reveals problems in addition to racism, such as the effects of gender, sexism, and class.

== Publications ==
- 2018 - O que é interseccionalidade? (What is intersectionality?).
- 2020 - Ó pa í, prezada! Racismo e sexismo institucionais tomando bonde nas penitenciárias femininas (Hey dad, dear! Institutional racism and sexism taking hold in women's penitentiaries).
