= Matheus Diniz =

Brazilian jiu-jitsu practitioner from Brazil (born 1993)

- Born: Matheus Oliveira Diniz; 8 April 1993 (age 33); Uberlândia, Minas Gerais, Brazil
- Nickname: King Kong
- Height: 6 ft 0 in (183 cm)
- Weight: 88.3 kg (195 lb; 13 st 13 lb)
- Division: Medium Heavy
- Style: Brazilian Jiu Jitsu
- Fighting out of: New York City, United States
- Team: Alliance Jiu Jitsu; Marcelo Garcia Academy
- Rank: BJJ black belt (under Marcelo Garcia)

Matheus Oliveira Diniz (born 8 April 1993) is a Brazilian submission wrestler and Brazilian jiu-jitsu (BJJ) black belt competitor. His most notable achievement is winning the 2019 ADCC World Championship in the Middleweight division as well as being a medalist at the IBJJF World Championships in both Gi and No-Gi formats.

== Background ==
Diniz was born on 8 April 1993 in Uberlândia, State of Minas Gerais, Brazil. During his early years, his family moved to Formiga. When Diniz was 10, he started learning Capoeira, before switching in 2008 to Brazilian jiu-jitsu (BJJ) under coach Rodrigo Ranieri.

After receiving his blue belt, Diniz moved to Poços de Caldas to train under Paulo Rezende who awarded him his purple and brown belts. As a purple belt Diniz won silver during the 2012 IBJJF World Championship in the medium heavy division. Diniz became acquainted with Marcelo Garcia who invited him to come to New York City to train at his academy. In April 2015, Garcia promoted Diniz to Black Belt.

== Grappling career ==
=== 2018-2019 ===
On 16 September 2018, Diniz faced Craig Jones at the main event of Grapplefest 2 that was held in Liverpool, UK. The match went to a decision with Jones winning by referee decision.

Diniz competed at the 2019 ADCC World Championship in the middleweight division. He defeated Pedro Marinho, Gabriel Arges and Josh Hinger to reach the finals. In the finals, he defeated Craig Jones by winning on points to become champion.

=== 2020-2022 ===
On 2 October 2020, Diniz was invited to compete in the main event of Who's Number One against Gordon Ryan. Diniz lost the match by submission, a heel hook. This match against Ryan was later awarded Match of the Year at the Jitsmagazine 2020 BJJ Awards. He was then invited to compete in the middleweight grand prix at BJJ Stars 4 on 14 November 2020. Diniz lost his opening round match against Otavio de Souza on advantages.

On 26 June 2021, Diniz faced Lucas Barbosa at the co-main event of BJJ Stars 6. Towards the end of the match, as Barbosa was ahead on points, Diniz managed to lock his arm underneath Barbosa's chin. When the bell rang signalling the end of the match, Barbosa was left unconscious from the choke. After debate, it was determined that Barbosa went unconscious after the bell and therefore had won via points. The decision was considered controversial and attracted debate. He then competed in the main event of the inaugural Road to ADCC event on 17 July 2021, against Kaynan Duarte. He lost the match after being submitted with a heel hook.

Diniz was invited to compete in the 88 kg division of the 2022 ADCC World Championship on 17 September 2022. He defeated Roberto Dib Frias 3–0 on points in the opening round before losing by submission to the eventual champion, Giancarlo Bodoni.

=== 2023 onwards ===
Diniz competed at the IBJJF New York Open 2023 on 5 August and won gold in the ultra-heavyweight division. Diniz then won the no gi super-heavyweight division at the IBJJF Nashville Fall Open 2023 on 12 November 2023.

Diniz faced Nicholas Meregali in a superfight at UFC Fight Pass Invitational 6 on March 2, 2024. He lost the match by submission.

Diniz was originally scheduled to compete in the 2024 ADCC World Championship, but he withdrew from the event in order to enter the under 80 kg division of the inaugural Craig Jones Invitational on August 16–17, 2024. He was submitted by Kade Ruotolo in the opening round.

== Championships and accomplishments ==
=== Brazilian jiu-jitsu / Submission wrestling ===
List of achievements at black belt level:

- ADCC Submission Fighting World Champion (2019)
- IBJJF Pan-American No-Gi Champion (2015 absolute)
- Kasai Pro 185 lbs Grand Prix Champion (2018)
- 2nd place IBJJF World No-Gi Championship (2015)
- 2nd place IBJJF Pan-American Championship (2022)
- 2nd place IBJJF Pan-American No-Gi Championship (2015)
- 3rd place IBJJF World Championship (2019)
- 3rd place IBJJF World No-Gi Championship (2015, 2016, 2017)
- 3rd place IBJJF Pan-American Championship (2017, 2018)

List of achievements in lower belts divisions:

- IBJJF World No-Gi Champion (2013/2014 brown)
- IBJJF Pan-American Champion (2015 brown)
- 2nd place IBJJF World Championship (2012 purple, 2014 brown)
- 2nd place IBJJF Pan-American Championship (2015 brown absolute)

== Instructor lineage ==
Mitsuyo "Count Koma" Maeda → Carlos Gracie Sr. → Helio Gracie → Rolls Gracie → Romero "Jacare" Cavalcanti → Fabio Gurgel → Marcelo Garcia → Matheus Diniz
