= Alex Freitas =

Alex Freitas may refer to:

- Alexandre Freitas (grappler) (born 1972), Brazilian grappler
- Alex Freitas (footballer, born 1988), Brazilian footballer who plays as a defender
- Alex Freitas (footballer, born 1991), Portuguese footballer who plays as a winger
- Alexander Freitas (born 1990), Canadian wrestler better known by the stage name Alex Silva
