= Felipe Pena =

Brazilian jiu-jitsu practitioner

- Born: 19 October 1991 (age 34); Belo Horizonte, Brazil
- Other names: "Preguiça"
- Division: Heavyweight
- Style: Brazilian Jiu Jitsu
- Team: Gracie Barra
- Rank: BJJ black belt

Felipe Carsalade Araujo Pena is a Brazilian Brazilian Jiu-Jitsu practitioner and three-time ADCC world champion.

== Career ==
Pena, nicknamed Preguiça meaning "Lazy", has won several medals at both the IBJJF and ADCC world championships throughout his career, competing dozens of times at the highest levels of the sport and defeating some of the biggest names. Pena defeated Erberth Santos in the co-main event of BJJ Bet on September 6, 2020 but injured his ankle in the process and was out of competition for the rest of the year.

=== 2021 ===
Pena was invited to compete in the BJJ Stars 5 heavyweight grand prix on February 5, 2021. He defeated Luiz Panza, Erich Munis, and Gutemberg Pereira to win the title. Pena then competed in a superfight at BJJ Stars 6 on June 26, 2021 and submitted Patrick Gaudio in the main event.

=== 2022 ===
He returned to the promotion once again for BJJ Stars 8 on April 30, 2022 and defeated Henrique Ceconi. Pena was then invited to compete at the 2022 ADCC World Championship, where he entered the over 99 kg division. He defeated Josh Saunders and Max Gimenis before losing to Nick Rodriguez, and chose not to compete in the bronze medal match in order to save his energy for the absolute division. Pena defeated Roberto Jimenez in the opening round of the absolute division but lost on points to Tye Ruotolo in the second round.

=== 2023 ===
Pena faced Rodriguez again on February 25, 2023 in the main event of a Who's Number One event, and won the rematch by unanimous decision.

Pena was scheduled to compete against Craig Jones in the main event of UFC Fight Pass Invitational 4 on June 29, 2023. He lost the match in overtime, by fastest escape.

Pena was scheduled to compete against Haisam Rida at Who's Number One 19 on August 10, 2023. He won the match by submission, with a rear-naked choke.

Pena then competed against Nicholas Meregali in the co-main event of UFC Fight Pass Invitational 5 on December 9, 2023. He lost the match by submission.

In 2021 Pena discussed making the transition to MMA and his goal to become a champion in that sport as well, although he has not had an official fight booked as yet.

=== Gordon Ryan rivalry ===
Pena is the only person to have twice defeated Gordon Ryan in competition, and the only person to have submitted him in black belt competition. Their rivalry began in 2016 when the pair met in a superfight at Studio 540, which Pena won by rear-naked choke. They met once again the following year in the final of the absolute division at ADCC 2017, where Pena defeated Ryan on points to claim the title. Over the next few years the pair went back and forth over a potential third match, although it wasn't booked for years to come. In the end, the pair agreed on a bet for a third match with Ryan putting up $100,000 of his own money against $10,000 of Pena's.

Their third bout was a no time-limit submission-only match scheduled to take place on August 7, 2022 in the main event of Who's Number One. In the 44th minute of the match, Pena forfeited and Ryan was declared the winner. Shortly after, it emerged that Pena had actually attempted to withdraw from the match due to the fact that his close friend and fellow BJJ practitioner Leandro Lo was shot and killed the night before. Pena asked the event organizers to set the match to a 30 minute time limit but Ryan, wanting to keep the original agreed upon ruleset, offered to postpone the match altogether to a later date. After some negotiations with the event organizer which resulted in a pay increase for Pena and guaranteed rematch, Pena accepted and the match went forward.

The pair then agreed to the same monetary bet for a potential fourth match at the 2022 ADCC World Championship, where Ryan was scheduled to compete in the over 99 kg division. In order to make this possible, Pena requested that he be moved up in weight to the same division. In the end, Pena lost in the semi-final to Nick Rodriguez and did not face Ryan at the event.

The fourth match between Pena and Ryan was then scheduled for February 25, 2023 in the main event of another Who's Number One card. Pena then moved in order to conduct his training camp at ATOS alongside Andre Galvao and his team. Ryan withdrew from the event on just a few day's notice as a result of stomach issues he suffered during the week leading up to it, and was replaced by Nick Rodriguez. Pena won by decision.

They then had their fourth match as a superfight on the first day of the 2024 ADCC World Championship on August 17, 2024. Pena lost the match 2-0 on points and the score in their series of matches moved to two wins each.

=== 2024 ===
Pena faced Rafael Lovato Jr. in a heavyweight match at Who's Number One 23: Meregali vs Rocha on May 10, 2024. He won the match by decision.

Pena was invited to compete in the over 99 kg division at the 2024 ADCC World Championship. He won all four matches to win gold in the over 99 kg division. Pena also competed in a superfight on the first day against Gordon Ryan, although he lost by decision.

Pena competed against Declan Moody in the main event of Who’s Number One 25 on December 4, 2024. He won the match by submission (guillotine).

== Controversies ==
Pena has twice tested positive for performance-enhancing drugs, in 2015 and 2022. Both cases involved Pena being tested after participating in, and winning at, the IBJJF world championships in the previous year and being stripped of these titles.

== See also ==
- André Galvão
- Gordon Ryan
- Yuri Simões
