= Lucas Barbosa (martial artist) =

Brazilian jiu-jitsu practitioner and mixed martial artist from Brazil (born 1992)

- Born: Lucas Daniel Silva Barbosa; 13 February 1992 (age 34); Boa Vista, Roraima, Brazil
- Nickname: Hulk
- Height: 5 ft 10 in (1.78 m)
- Weight: 170 lb (77 kg; 12 st 2 lb)
- Division: Medium Heavy 88.3 kg (194.7 lb); Welterweight (MMA)
- Style: Brazilian Jiu Jitsu
- Fighting out of: San Diego, California, United States
- Team: Atos Jiu-Jitsu; Equipe Márcio Rodrigues
- Rank: 3rd degree BJJ black belt (under André Fabiano)
- Years active: 2011–2012, 2023–present (MMA)

Mixed martial arts record
- Total: 4
- Wins: 2
- By knockout: 1
- By submission: 1
- Losses: 2
- By decision: 2

Other information
- Mixed martial arts record from Sherdog

Lucas Daniel Silva Barbosa (born 13 February 1992), commonly known as Lucas 'Hulk' Barbosa, is a Brazilian mixed martial artist (MMA), submission grappler and Brazilian jiu-jitsu (BJJ) black belt competitor.

Barbosa has conquered nearly every major title in the sport; being a World and Pan American champion (Gi and No-Gi), European Open and Asian IBJJF champion as well as a two-time ADCC Submission Fighting World Championship medalist.

== Background ==
Lucas Daniel Barbosa was born on 13 February 1992, in Boa Vista, Roraima, Brazil. He took up martial arts at the age of 10, starting with Taekwondo then Judo and Muay Thai. At 15 Barbosa began Brazilian jiu-jitsu (BJJ) under various coaches from Diego Lopes to Cristiano Carioca and André Galvão. After being promoted to purple belt, Barbosa moved to Rio to train at Márcio Rodrigues's academy, receiving the nickname "Hulk" from his training partners.

== Grappling career ==
Barbosa was awarded his Brown Belt in BJJ by Fabiano and Márcio Rodrigues. It was at Brown Belt that Barbosa's grappling career took off. In 2014, he was involved with "THE TEAM" in 2014, a web series developed by Copa Podio, a sports league that showed BJJ competitions on television. Barbosa's strong performance earned him a spot later that year at the competition's main which was on Pay-per-view.

In 2015, Barbosa won the World IBJJF Jiu-Jitsu Championship and Abu Dhabi World Professional Jiu-Jitsu Championship as a Brown Belt. As a result, Fabiano awarded Barbosa his Black Belt in BJJ.

Shortly afterwards, Barbosa moved to San Diego, California, to join Atos Jiu-Jitsu under André Galvão. Since moving to Atos Jiu-Jitsu, Barbosa has won most major BJJ tournaments at Black Belt level including the World Championship and the World No-GI Championship. He also is a multiple-time medalist at the ADCC World Championship.

=== 2020 ===
Barbosa was invited to compete in the Third Coast Grappling grand prix 6 on 12 September 2020. He withdrew from the event due to undisclosed reasons. He was matched at the promotion's next event instead, in a superfight against Guilherme Augusto. Barbosa won a unanimous decision against Augusto at the event on 26 September 2020.

Barbosa represented ATOS in a team-grappling event at Subversiv 4 on 31 October 2020. He led his team to victory in the tournament, defeating all four of his opponents on the night.

=== 2021 ===
Barbosa was invited to compete in a heavyweight grand prix at BJJ Stars 5 on 6 February 2021. He defeated Yuri Simões on points in the first round but lost a decision to Gutemberg Pereira in the semi-final. Barbosa then led ATOS once again at Subversiv 5 on 1 May 2021. Barbosa once again won all of his matches and ATOS won the tournament for the second time.

Barbosa competed in the main event of Fight 2 Win 174 against Aaron 'Tex' Johnson on 18 June 2021, and lost a decision. On 26 June 2021, he defeat Matheus Diniz on points at BJJ Stars 6. He was then invited to compete in the first Road to ADCC event on 17 July 2021, against William Tackett. Barbosa managed to score thirty-four points against Tackett during their match and won by a wide margin.

Barbosa then competed in a no gi grand prix at BJJ Bet 2 on 1 August 2021, and defeated all three of his opponents to win the tournament. He was then invited to compete in the main event of BJJ Stars 7 against UFC veteran Gilbert Burns on 6 November 2021, and he submitted Burns with a rear-naked choke. Barbosa competed in the inaugural Raw Grappling Championship event on 12 November 2021, in a superfight against Gerard Labinski, submitting him with an armbar.

=== 2022 ===
Barbosa competed in a middleweight grand prix at BJJ Stars 8 on 15 February 2022, and defeated his first two opponents before losing to Micael Galvão in the final. He was then invited to compete in the 2022 ADCC World Championship as a result of winning a medal at the event in 2019. He defeated Santeri Lilius, Josh Hinger, and Vagner Rocha before losing to Giancarlo Bodoni in the final and earning a silver medal.

=== 2023 ===
Barbosa competed in the IBJJF Jiu-Jitsu Con International on 1 September 2023 and won gold medals in both the heavyweight and absolute gi divisions. He returned to compete in the no gi edition of the event later that day, winning a silver medal at heavyweight and a bronze medal in the absolute division.

Barbosa was scheduled to challenge Gordon Ryan for the WNO heavyweight title at Who's Number One 21: Ryan v Barbosa on 30 November 2023. Ryan later withdrew from the match due to a rib injury, and was replaced by his teammate Giancarlo Bodoni. Barbosa lost the match by judge's decision.

=== 2024 ===
Barbosa competed against AJ Agazarm at Pit Submission Series 5 on May 30, 2024. He won the match by decision.

Barbosa was due to compete at EBI 21: The Absolutes on June 2, 2024. He later withdrew from the event and was replaced by Brandon George.

Barbosa was due to compete against Isaque Bahiense at BJJ Stars 13: Vikings Edition on August 3, 2024. But he withdrew from the match and was replaced by Alexandre de Jesus.

Barbosa competed in the -80 kg division at the inaugural Craig Jones Invitational on August 16–17, 2024 He beat Kenta Iwamoto by decision in the opening round and submitted Jozef Chen in the quarter-final before losing a decision to Levi Jones-Leary in the semi-final.

=== 2025 ===
Barbosa then faced Dory Aoun at Who’s Number One 28 on June 13, 2025. He won the match by decision.

== Mixed martial arts career ==
Barbosa made his debut in 2011 where he lost a split decision against Geydson Cardoso.

In 2012, Barbosa faced Tiago Sena twice, winning by Submission and then TKO.

In 2020, Barbosa stated in an interview that he planned to return to MMA due to financial incentives as well as seeking more challenges. He reiterated this in 2021, announcing his intention to return by the end of the year.

In February 2022, it was announced that Barbosa was scheduled to fight Troy Green at the PFL Challenger Series 2. However Green withdrew from the fight and no replacement was found.

In August 2022, it was announced that Barbosa was scheduled to fight Elmar Umarov at PFL 7. However Umarov withdrew due to illness.

Barbosa faced Itso Babulaidze at PFL Challenger Series 9 on 27 January 2023. After a strong start, Barbosa faded as the bout went and he lost the bout via unanimous decision.

== Championships and accomplishments ==
=== Brazilian jiu-jitsu / Submission wrestling ===
List of achievements at black belt level:

- World IBJJF Jiu-Jitsu Champion (2018 (Note: Closed bracket with teammate))
- 4 x World IBJJF No-Gi champion (2017, (Note: Weight and absolute) 2016, 2015)
- 2 x Pan-American IBJJF Champion (2019, (Note: Absolute) 2018)
- Pan-American IBJJF No-Gi Champion (2021, 2020)
- European Open IBJJF Champion (2018)
- 2 x Asian IBJJF Champion (2018, 2017)
- UAEJJF Grand Slam Champion, Los Angeles (2017)
- UAEJJF Grand Slam Champion, Abu Dhabi (2019)
- American Nationals IBJJF Champion (2017)
- American Nationals IBJJF No-Gi Champion (2017, 2016)
- FIVE Super League LHW Champion (2017)
- Chicago Summer Open IBJJF Champion (2016)
- Chicago Summer Open IBJJF No-Gi Champion (2016)
- Dallas Fall Open IBJJF Champion (2017)
- 2nd place ADCC Submission Fighting World Championship (2022)
- 2nd place World IBJJF Championship (2021)
- 2nd place European Open IBJJF No-Gi Champion (2018)
- 2nd place Pan IBJJF Championship (2017)
- 2nd place Pan IBJJF No-Gi Championship (2021, 2020)
- 3rd place ADCC Submission Fighting World Championship (2019)
- 3rd place European Open IBJJF (2018)

List of achievements in lower belts divisions:

- World IBJJF Jiu-Jitsu Champion (2015 brown)
- UAEJJF Abu Dhabi World Pro Champion (2015 brown)
- South American IBJJF Champion (2014 brown)
- CBJJ Brazilian Nationals Champion (2014 brown)
- Rio Fall Open IBJJF Champion (2015 brown)
- Rio Fall Open IBJJF No-Gi Champion (2015 brown)

== Mixed martial arts record ==
Professional record breakdown
4 matches	2 wins	2 losses
By knockout	1	0
By submission	1	0
By decision	0	2

Res.	Record	Opponent	Method	Event	Date	Round	Time	Location	Notes
Loss	2–2	Itso Babulaidze	Decision (unanimous)	PFL Challenger Series 9	27 January 2023	3	5:00	Orlando, Florida, United States	
Win	2–1	Tiago Sena	TKO (punches)	Roraima Show Fight 10	11 August 2012	1	3:50	Boa Vista, Brazil	
Win	1–1	Tiago Sena	Submission (Rear-Naked Choke)	Roraima Show Fight 9	15 April 2012	2	0:00	Boa Vista, Brazil	
Loss	0–1	Geydson Manfrinny Cardoso	Decision (split)	Boa Vista Combat 2	11 September 2011	3	5:00	Boa Vista, Brazil	Welterweight (170 lb) debut.

== Instructor lineage ==
Mitsuyo "Count Koma" Maeda → Carlos Gracie → Reyson Gracie → Osvaldo Alves → Pascoal Duarte → Diego Lopes → André Fabiano → Lucas Barbosa
