= Orlando Sanchez (fighter) =

American martial artist (1982–2022)

- Born: February 5, 1982
- Died: December 15, 2022 (aged 40)
- Other names: The Cuban Tree Stump
- Height: 5 ft 9 in (175 cm)
- Weight: 260 lb (118 kg; 18 st 8 lb)
- Division: Heavyweight
- Fighting out of: Pasadena, California
- Rank: 3rd degree black belt in Brazilian Jiu-Jitsu

Mixed martial arts record
- Total: 6
- Wins: 5
- By knockout: 4
- By submission: 1
- Losses: 0
- No contests: 1

Other information
- Mixed martial arts record from Sherdog

Orlando Sanchez (February 5, 1982 – December 15, 2022) was an American submission grappler and mixed martial arts (MMA) fighter. He was known as the "Cuban Tree Stump" and "the Big O".

== Competition career ==
Sanchez earned his black belt in BJJ in four years. He won the ADCC Submission Fighting World Championship in 2015. He was undefeated in MMA.

He is best known for competing at ADCC, where he earned a gold medal in 2015 and a silver medal in 2017. His final appearance was at the 2022 ADCC World Championship and he was inducted into the ADCC Hall of Fame in 2024.

== Death ==
Sanchez died in December 2022 from a fentanyl and methamphetamine overdose.

== Mixed martial arts record ==
Professional record breakdown
6 matches	5 wins	0 losses
By knockout	4	0
By submission	1	0
No contests	1	

Res.	Record	Opponent	Method	Event	Date	Round	Time	Location	Notes
Win	5–0 (1)	Cesar Stubbert Cortez	TKO (punches)	CRF 16	April 18, 2015	1	2:12	San Jose, Costa Rica	
NC	4–0 (1)	Robert Gonzalez	No Contest	WFC 4	January 18, 2013	1	4:35	Sacramento, California, United States	
Win	4–0	C.J. Leveque	TKO (submission to punches)	WFC – Resolution	September 8, 2012	1	1:27	Yuba City, California, United States	
Win	3–0	Julian Collins	Submission	Maxx FC 16	June 2, 2012	1	2:52	San Juan, Puerto Rico	
Win	2–0	William Wheeler	TKO (punches)	National Fight Alliance	October 29, 2011	1	0:56	Los Angeles, California, United States	
Win	1–0	Juan Miranda	TKO (knees and punches)	XVT 5	December 19, 2010	1	0:13	Cartago, Costa Rica	
