= ADCC Submission Fighting World Championship =

Grappling competitions

- Logo

Competition details
- Discipline: Submission Grappling
- Competition: Brazilian Jiu Jitsu
- Type: Biennial
- Organiser: Mo Jassim

Divisions
- Current weight divisions: Men: Absolute Class; +99 kg (+220.5 lbs); -98.9 kg (-218.0 lbs); -87.9 kg (-193.7 lbs); -76.9 kg (-169.5 lbs); -65.9 kg (-145.2 lbs); Women: +60.0 kg (+132.2 lbs); -60.0 kg (-132.2 lbs)

The ADCC Submission Fighting World Championship is an international submission grappling competition, organised by the Abu Dhabi Combat Club (ADCC). ADCC is considered one of the most prestigious No-Gi submission grappling tournaments in the world, and is commonly referred to as The Olympics of Grappling.

The inaugural tournament was held in Abu Dhabi, UAE in 1998. Held every two years, host countries have included Brazil, China, Finland, Spain, the UK, and the US. Competitors can earn a spot by winning ADCC trials or by invitation.

== History ==
The competition was created by Sheik Tahnoun Bin Zayed Al Nahyan, the son of the former United Arab Emirates president Sheikh Zayed bin Sultan Al Nahyan, together with his Brazilian jiu-jitsu instructor Nelson Monteiro. As a young man, the future Sheikh was studying in the United States when he watched UFC 1 and saw Royce Gracie win the tournament using Brazilian Jiu-Jitsu. Inspired by him, Al Nahyan learned the martial art.

In 1997, Sheik Al Nahyan together with Nelson Monteiro promoted the Pentagon Combat, a Vale Tudo event in Rio de Janeiro. The event was intended to serve as the innaugural event to a Brazilian counterpart to the Ultimate Fighting Championship (UFC), where Brazilian Jiu-Jitsu fighters would test their skills against practitioners of other martial arts in full-contact combat. The main event featured Brazilian Jiu-Jitsu practitioner Renzo Gracie against Luta Livre fighter Eugênio Tadeu, and was seen as another chapter in the longstanding rivalry between Brazilian Jiu-Jitsu and Luta Livre. The bout ended in a no contest after an altercation between the fighters' supporters escalated into a full riot, bringing the event to an abrupt end. The incident contributed to the banning of Vale Tudo events in Rio de Janeiro and led Sheik Al Nahyan to reconsider the format of his planned combat sports competition. Rather than continuing with Vale Tudo, he and Monteiro developed the idea of what was essentially a "UFC without punches": a competition in which practitioners of different grappling and submission arts could face one another under a common set of rules, but without strikes. In keeping with the original concept of the UFC, which had pitted practitioners of different martial arts against one another, the new competition would bring together athletes from Brazilian Jiu-Jitsu, Luta Livre, wrestling, judo, sambo, catch-as-catch-can, and other grappling disciplines to determine which styles were most effective in submission fighting.

This concept became the Abu Dhabi Combat Club Submission Fighting World Championship, with the inaugural event held in Abu Dhabi in March 1998.

Royler Gracie characterised this as the beginning of "the modern era of submission grappling". Thousands of submission grappling tournaments around the world use elements of the ADCC format and rule structure. To date, the great majority of ADCC champions have been black belts in Brazilian jiu-jitsu, which has the most similar rules to ADCC. However, there have been notable exceptions to this such as Americans Mark Kerr (collegiate and freestyle wrestling) and Jeff Monson (collegiate and freestyle wrestling), Russian Karimula Barkalaev (sambo, judo and MMA), Japanese Sanae Kikuta (judo/catch wrestling), and South African Mark Robinson (judo, freestyle, Greco-Roman, and sumo wrestling), along with silver and bronze medalists such as Caol Uno (Shooto/catch wrestling), Mach Sakurai (catch wrestling/judo), Aleksandr Savko (freestyle wrestling), Tito Ortiz (collegiate wrestling and MMA), Megumi Fujii (judo/sambo), Seiko Yamamoto (freestyle wrestling) and Nick Rodriguez (collegiate wrestling).

=== 2019 onwards ===
Mo Jassim took over as head organizer ready for ADCC 2019 and has since made sweeping changes to the organization. He announced that he had plans for adding more women's divisions and allowing reigning absolute champions to compete in weight-classes despite being booked for the main event superfight. It was announced in 2020 that for the first time in the competition's history, there would be more than two years between editions due to the setbacks suffered as a result of the COVID-19 pandemic. The 2021 edition of the ADCC World Championships would then take place in 2022 instead, and would still be helmed by Jassim. After the success of the 2022 ADCC World Championship, it was announced that Jassim would return for the 2024 ADCC World Championship be the first person to operate as head organizer for three editions. The 2022 edition took place in front of 13,000 fans in attendance at the Thomas & Mack Center in Las Vegas.

In January 2023, ADCC announced an exclusive multi-year streaming deal with UFC Fight Pass and left their previous broadcaster FloSports. Just three months later on April 27, 2023, ADCC announced that they would be returning to FloSports for the foreseeable future.

On June 25, 2023, it was announced that the following edition of the ADCC World Championship would include three women's weight classes, marking the first time since 2007 that there was more than two available. It was also later announced that this the 2024 ADCC World Championship would also be the first edition to include a women's absolute division since 2007. On July 17, 2023, head organizer Mo Jassim announced that there would be a children's version of the ADCC World Championship held for the first time during the 2024 edition of the tournament. In 2024 it was held 17-18 August at the T-Mobile Arena in Las Vegas.

== ADCC world championships ==
=== List of ADCC Champions in Men's Submission Fighting by Year and Weight ===
Year	Host	66 kg	77 kg	88 kg	99 kg	+99 kg	Absolute
1998	Abu Dhabi	Alexander Freitas (1/1)	Renzo Gracie (1/2)	Rodrigo Gracie (1/1)	Mario Sperry (1/2)	Ricco Rodriguez (1/1)	Mario Sperry (2/2)
1999	Abu Dhabi	Royler Gracie (1/3)	Jean Jacques Machado (1/1)	Karimula Barkalaev (1/1)	Jeff Monson (1/2)	Mark Kerr (1/3)	Roberto Traven (1/1)
2000	Abu Dhabi	Royler Gracie (2/3)	Renzo Gracie (2/2)	Saulo Ribeiro (1/2)	Ricardo Arona (1/3)	Mark Kerr (2/3)	Mark Kerr (3/3)
2001	Abu Dhabi	Royler Gracie (3/3)	Marcio Feitosa (1/1)	Sanae Kikuta (1/1)	Ricardo Arona (2/3)	Mark Robinson (1/1)	Ricardo Arona (3/3)
2003	São Paulo	Leo Vieira (1/2)	Marcelo Garcia (1/4)	Saulo Ribeiro (2/2)	Jon Olav Einemo (1/1)	Márcio Cruz (1/1)	Dean Lister (1/2)
2005	Long Beach	Leo Vieira (2/2)	Marcelo Garcia (2/4)	Ronaldo Souza (1/1)	Roger Gracie (1/2)	Jeff Monson (2/2)	Roger Gracie (2/2)
2007	Trenton	Rani Yahya (1/1)	Marcelo Garcia (3/4)	Demian Maia (1/1)	Alexandre Ribeiro (1/2)	Fabrício Werdum (1/2)	Robert Drysdale (1/1)
2009	Barcelona	Rafael Mendes (1/2)	Pablo Popovitch (1/1)	Braulio Estima (1/2)	Alexandre Ribeiro (2/2)	Fabrício Werdum (2/2)	Braulio Estima (2/2)
2011	Nottingham	Rafael Mendes (2/2)	Marcelo Garcia (4/4)	André Galvão (1/2)	Dean Lister (2/2)	Vinny Magalhães (1/1)	André Galvão (2/2)
2013	Beijing	Rubens Charles (1/3)	Kron Gracie (1/1)	Romulo Barral (1/1)	João Assis (1/1)	Marcus Almeida (1/2)	Roberto Abreu (1/1)
2015	São Paulo	Rubens Charles (2/3)	Davi Ramos (1/1)	Yuri Simões (1/3)	Rodolfo Vieira (1/1)	Orlando Sanchez (1/1)	Claudio Calasans (1/1)
2017	Espoo	Rubens Charles (3/3)	Jonathan Torres (1/2)	Gordon Ryan (1/4)	Yuri Simões (2/3)	Marcus Almeida (2/2)	Felipe Pena (1/3)
2019	Anaheim	Augusto Mendes (1/1)	Jonathan Torres (2/2)	Matheus Diniz (1/1)	Gordon Ryan (2/4)	Kaynan Duarte (1/2)	Gordon Ryan (3/4)
2022	Las Vegas	Diogo Reis (1/2)	Kade Ruotolo (1/1)	Giancarlo Bodoni (1/2)	Kaynan Duarte (2/2)	Gordon Ryan (4/4)	Yuri Simões (3/3)
2024	Las Vegas	Diogo Reis (2/2)	Micael Galvão (1/1)	Giancarlo Bodoni (2/2)	Kaynan Duarte (3/4)	Felipe Pena (2/3)	Kaynan Duarte (4/4)
2026	Krakow	Kennedy Maciel (1/1)	Magomed Dzharbaev (1/1)	Pawel Jaworski (1/1)	Luke Griffith (1/1)	Victor Hugo (1/1)	Felipe Pena (3/3)

=== List of ADCC Champions in Women's Submission Fighting by Year and Weight ===
==== 2005 ====
Year	Host	–60 kg	+60 kg	Absolute
2005	United States	Kyra Gracie (1/3)	Juliana Borges (1/2)	Juliana Borges (2/2)

==== 2007 ====
Year	Host	–55 kg	–60 kg	–67 kg	+67 kg	Absolute
2007	United States	Sayaka Shioda (1/1)	Kyra Gracie (2/3)	Hannette Staack (1/3)	Penny Thomas (1/1)	Hannette Staack (2/3)

==== 2009–2022 ====
Year	Host	–60 kg	+60 kg
2009	Spain	Luanna Alzuguir (1/1)	Hannette Staack (3/3)
2011	United Kingdom	Kyra Gracie (3/3)	Gabi Garcia (1/4)
2013	China	Michelle Nicolini (1/1)	Gabi Garcia (2/4)
2015	Brazil	Mackenzie Dern (1/1)	Ana Laura Cordeiro (1/1)
2017	Finland	Beatriz Mesquita (1/1)	Gabi Garcia (3/4)
2019	United States	Bianca Basílio (1/1)	Gabi Garcia (4/4)
2022	United States	Ffion Davies (1/1)	Amy Campo (1/1)

==== 2024 ====
Year	Host	–55 kg	–65 kg	+65 kg	Absolute
2024	United States	Adele Fornarino (1/2)	Ana Carolina Vieira (1/2)	Rafaela Guedes (1/1)	Adele Fornarino (2/2)

==== 2026 ====
Year	Host	–55 kg	-65 kg	+65 kg
2026	Poland	Jasmine Rocha (1/1)	Ana Carolina Vieira (2/2)	Helena Crevar (1/1)

=== List of ADCC Superfight Champions ===
Year	Host	Winner	Loser
1999	United Arab Emirates	Mario Sperry (1/2)	Enson Inoue
2000	United Arab Emirates	Mario Sperry (2/2)	Roberto Traven
2001	United Arab Emirates	Mark Kerr (1/1)	Mario Sperry
2003	Brazil	Ricardo Arona (1/1)	Mark Kerr
2005	United States	Dean Lister (1/1)	Jean Jacques Machado
2007	United States	Roger Gracie (1/1)	Jon Olav Einemo
2009	Spain	Ronaldo Souza (1/1)	Robert Drysdale
2011	United Kingdom	Braulio Estima (1/1)	Ronaldo Souza
2013	China	André Galvão (1/4)	Braulio Estima
2015	Brazil	André Galvão (2/4)	Roberto Abreu
2017	Finland	André Galvão (3/4)	Claudio Calasans
2019	United States	André Galvão (4/4)	Felipe Pena
2022	United States	Gordon Ryan (1/3)	André Galvão
2024	United States	Gordon Ryan (2/3)	Felipe Pena
2024	United States	Gordon Ryan (3/3)	Yuri Simões
2026	Poland	Yuri Simões (1/1)	Kaynan Duarte

=== List of winners by total titles ===
Rank	Wrestler	Total	Absolute	Weight Class	Super Fight	Winning years
1	(United States) Gordon Ryan	7	1	3	3	2017, 2019, 2022, 2024
2	(Brazil) André Galvão	6	1	1	4	2011, 2013, 2015, 2017, 2019
3	(Brazil) Marcelo Garcia	4	0	4	0	2003, 2005, 2007, 2011
3	(Brazil) Kaynan Duarte	4	1	3	0	2019, 2022, 2024
3	(Brazil) Mário Sperry	4	1	1	2	1998, 1999, 2000
3	(Brazil) Gabi Garcia	4	0	4	0	2011, 2013, 2017, 2019
3	(United States) Mark Kerr	4	1	2	1	1999, 2000, 2001
3	(Brazil) Ricardo Arona	4	1	2	1	2000, 2001, 2003
3	(Brazil) Yuri Simões	4	1	2	1	2015, 2017, 2022, 2026
10	(Brazil) Hannette Staack	3	1	2	0	2007, 2009
10	(Brazil) Royler Gracie	3	0	3	0	1999, 2000, 2001
10	(Brazil) Kyra Gracie	3	0	3	0	2005, 2007, 2011
10	(Brazil) Rubens Charles	3	0	3	0	2013, 2015, 2017
10	(Brazil) Roger Gracie	3	1	1	1	2005, 2007
10	(Brazil) Braulio Estima	3	1	1	1	2009, 2011
10	(United States) Dean Lister	3	1	1	1	2003, 2005, 2011
10	(Brazil) Felipe Pena	3	1	2	0	2017, 2024, 2026
18	(Brazil) Renzo Gracie	2	0	2	0	1998, 2000
18	(Brazil) Juliana Borges	2	1	1	0	2005
18	(Brazil) Saulo Ribeiro	2	0	2	0	2000, 2003
18	(Brazil) Leo Vieira	2	0	2	0	2003, 2005
18	(United States) Jeff Monson	2	0	2	0	1999, 2005
18	(Brazil) Alexandre Ribeiro	2	0	2	0	2007, 2009
18	(Brazil) Fabrício Werdum	2	0	2	0	2007, 2009
18	(Brazil) Rafael Mendes	2	0	2	0	2009, 2011
18	(Brazil) Marcus Almeida	2	0	2	0	2013, 2017
18	(Brazil) Diogo Reis	2	0	2	0	2022, 2024
18	(United States) Jonathan Torres	2	0	2	0	2017, 2019
18	(United States) Giancarlo Bodoni	2	0	2	0	2022, 2024
18	(Brazil) Ronaldo Souza	2	0	1	1	2005, 2009
18	(Australia) Adele Fornarino	2	1	1	0	2024
18	(Brazil) Ana Carolina Vieira	2	0	2	0	2024, 2026
33	(Brazil) Roberto Traven	1	1	0	0	1998
33	(United States) Robert Drysdale	1	1	0	0	2007
33	(Brazil) Roberto Abreu	1	1	0	0	2013
33	(Brazil) Claudio Calasans	1	1	0	0	2015
33	(Brazil) Alexander Freitas	1	0	1	0	1998
33	(Brazil) Rodrigo Gracie	1	0	1	0	1998
33	(United States) Ricco Rodriguez	1	0	1	0	1998
33	(Brazil) Jean Jacques Machado	1	0	1	0	1999
33	(Russia) Karimula Barkalaev	1	0	1	0	1999
33	(Brazil) Marcio Feitosa	1	0	1	0	2001
33	(Japan) Sanae Kikuta	1	0	1	0	2001
33	(South Africa) Mark Robinson	1	0	1	0	2001
33	(Norway) Jon Olav Einemo	1	0	1	0	2003
33	(Brazil) Márcio Cruz	1	0	1	0	2003
33	(Japan) Sayaka Shioda	1	0	1	0	2007
33	(South Africa) Penny Thomas	1	0	1	0	2007
33	(Brazil) Rani Yahya	1	0	1	0	2007
33	(Brazil) Demian Maia	1	0	1	0	2007
33	(Brazil) Luanna Alzuguir	1	0	1	0	2009
33	(Brazil) Pablo Popovitch	1	0	1	0	2009
33	(Brazil) Vinny Magalhães	1	0	1	0	2011
33	(Brazil) Michelle Nicolini	1	0	1	0	2013
33	(Brazil) Kron Gracie	1	0	1	0	2013
33	(Brazil) Romulo Barral	1	0	1	0	2013
33	(Brazil) João Assis	1	0	1	0	2013
33	(United States) Mackenzie Dern	1	0	1	0	2015
33	(Brazil) Ana Laura Cordeiro	1	0	1	0	2015
33	(Brazil) Davi Ramos	1	0	1	0	2015
33	(Brazil) Rodolfo Vieira	1	0	1	0	2015
33	(United States) Orlando Sanchez	1	0	1	0	2015
33	(Brazil) Beatriz Mesquita	1	0	1	0	2017
33	(Brazil) Bianca Basílio	1	0	1	0	2019
33	(Brazil) Augusto Mendes	1	0	1	0	2019
33	(Brazil) Matheus Diniz	1	0	1	0	2019
33	(United States) Kade Ruotolo	1	0	1	0	2022
33	(Wales) Ffion Davies	1	0	1	0	2022
33	(United States) Amy Campo	1	0	1	0	2022
33	(Brazil) Micael Galvão	1	0	1	0	2024
33	(Brazil) Rafaela Guedes	1	0	1	0	2024
33	(Brazil) Kennedy Maciel	1	0	1	0	2026
33	(Russia) Magomed Dzharbaev	1	0	1	0	2026
33	(Poland) Pawel Jaworski	1	0	1	0	2026
33	(South Africa) Luke Griffith	1	0	1	0	2026
33	(Brazil) Victor Hugo	1	0	1	0	2026
33	(United States) Jasmine Rocha	1	0	1	0	2026
33	(United States) Helena Crevar	1	0	1	0	2026

=== Grand Slam Winners (trials, weight, absolute and superfight) ===
- Roger Gracie (2004, 2005, 2005, 2007)
- Dean Lister (2002, 2011, 2003, 2005)
- André Galvão (2007/2009, 2011, 2011, 2013/2015/2017/2019)

=== Triple Crown Winners (weight, absolute and superfight) ===
- Mario Sperry
- Mark Kerr
- Ricardo Arona
- Roger Gracie
- Braulio Estima
- Dean Lister
- André Galvão
- Gordon Ryan
- Yuri Simões

=== ADCC Hall of Fame ===
- Roger Gracie
- Andre Galvao
- Marcelo Garcia
- Ricardo Arona
- Kyra Gracie
- Braulio Estima
- Royler Gracie
- Dean Lister
- Mario Sperry
- Rubens Charles
- Saulo Ribeiro
- Mark Kerr
- Baret Yoshida
- Renzo Gracie
- Rafael Mendes
- Xande Ribeiro
- Jean Jacques Machado
- Ronaldo Souza
- Fabrício Werdum
- Vinny Magalhães
- Orlando Sanchez

=== Most submissions ===
Year	Host	Grappler	Submissions
1998	United Arab Emirates	Alexander Freitas; Ricardo Morais; Mario Sperry	3
1999	United Arab Emirates	Jean Jacques Machado	4
2001	United Arab Emirates	Jean Jacques Machado	3
2003	Brazil	Marcelo Garcia; Dean Lister	4
2005	United States	Roger Gracie	8
2007	United States	Marcelo Garcia	7
2009	Spain	Braulio Estima	6
2011	United Kingdom	Marcelo Garcia; Dean Lister; Rousimar Palhares	3
2013	China	Dean Lister	5
2015	Brazil	Davi Ramos	3
2017	Finland	Gordon Ryan	5
2019	United States	Gordon Ryan	6
2022	United States	Giancarlo Bodoni; Kade Ruotolo; Gordon Ryan	4
2024	Brazil	Kaynan Duarte	7
ALL TIME		Marcelo Garcia	24

=== By nationality ===
Country	Total
Brazil	80
United States	18
South Africa	3
Australia	2
Japan	2
Russia	2
Norway	1
Wales	1
Poland	1

== ADCC events ==
=== ADCC 2026 ===
Event	Gold	Silver	Bronze
-66 kg	(Brazil) Kennedy Maciel (BRA)	(United States) Gavin Corbe (USA)	(Brazil) Diego Pato (BRA)
-77 kg	(Russia) Magomed Dzharbaev (RUS)	(United States) PJ Barch (USA)	(Poland) Mateusz Szczecinski (POL)
-88 kg	(Poland) Pawel Jaworski (POL)	(Sweden) Marlon Tajik (SWE)	(South Africa) Jozef Chen (ZAF)
-99 kg	(South Africa) Luke Griffith (ZAF)	(Brazil) Kaynan Duarte (BRA)	(Australia) Daniel Schuardt (AUS)
+99kg	(Brazil) Victor Hugo (BRA)	(Australia) Josh Saunders (AUS)	(Scotland) Mark Macqueen (SCO)
Absolute	(Brazil) Felipe Pena (BRA)	(Brazil) Roosevelt Sousa (BRA)	(Russia) Ruslan Abdulaev (RUS)
Women's –55 kg	(United States) Jasmine Rocha (USA)	(Brazil) Anna Rodrigues (BRA)	(Spain) Ana Mayordomo (ESP)
Women's -65 kg	(Brazil) Ana Carolina Vieira (BRA)	(Brazil) Sarah Galvão (BRA)	(United States) Joslyn Molina (USA)
Women's +65 kg	(United States) Helena Crevar (USA)	(Spain) Anabel Lopez (ESP)	(United States) Paige Ivette Clymer (USA)

=== ADCC 2024 ===
Event	Gold	Silver	Bronze
-66 kg	(Brazil) Diogo Reis (BRA); Melqui Galvao Jiu-Jitsu	(Brazil) Diego "Pato" Oliveira (BRA); Dream Art	
-66 kg	(Brazil) Diogo Reis (BRA); Melqui Galvao Jiu-Jitsu	(Brazil) Diego "Pato" Oliveira (BRA); Dream Art	(United States) Josh Cisneros (USA); Elite Team Visalia
-77 kg	(Brazil) Micael Galvâo (BRA); Melqui Galvao Jiu-Jitsu	(Brazil) Vagner Rocha (BRA); Vagner Rocha Martial Arts	
-77 kg	(Brazil) Micael Galvâo (BRA); Melqui Galvao Jiu-Jitsu	(Brazil) Vagner Rocha (BRA); Vagner Rocha Martial Arts	(United States) PJ Barch (USA); 10th Planet Jiu Jitsu
-88 kg	(United States) Giancarlo Bodoni (USA); New Wave Jiu Jitsu	(United States) Jay Rodriguez (USA); B Team Jiu Jitsu	
-88 kg	(United States) Giancarlo Bodoni (USA); New Wave Jiu Jitsu	(United States) Jay Rodriguez (USA); B Team Jiu Jitsu	(Brazil) Felipe Costa (BRA); Six Blades Jiu-Jitsu
-99 kg	(Brazil) Kaynan Duarte (BRA); Atos Jiu-Jitsu	(United States) Rafael Lovato Jr. (USA); Lovato Jiu-Jitsu	
-99 kg	(Brazil) Kaynan Duarte (BRA); Atos Jiu-Jitsu	(United States) Rafael Lovato Jr. (USA); Lovato Jiu-Jitsu	(Brazil) Cyborg Abreu (BRA); Fight Sports
+99 kg	(Brazil) Felipe Pena (BRA); Gracie Barra	(South Africa) Luke Griffith (ZAF); New Wave Jiu Jitsu	
+99 kg	(Brazil) Felipe Pena (BRA); Gracie Barra	(South Africa) Luke Griffith (ZAF); New Wave Jiu Jitsu	(United States) Daniel Manasoiu (USA); New Wave Jiu Jitsu
Absolute	(Brazil) Kaynan Duarte (BRA); Atos Jiu-Jitsu	(Brazil) Cyborg Abreu (BRA); Fight Sports	
Absolute	(Brazil) Kaynan Duarte (BRA); Atos Jiu-Jitsu	(Brazil) Cyborg Abreu (BRA); Fight Sports	(Canada) Dante Leon (CAN); GFTeam
Women's -55 kg	(Australia) Adele Fornarino (AUS); Dominance MMA	(Brazil) Bianca Basílio (BRA); Atos Jiu-Jitsu	
Women's -55 kg	(Australia) Adele Fornarino (AUS); Dominance MMA	(Brazil) Bianca Basílio (BRA); Atos Jiu-Jitsu	(Brazil) Jasmine Rocha (BRA); Vagner Rocha Martial Arts
Women's -65 kg	(Brazil) Ana Carolina Vieira (BRA); GFTeam	(United States) Helena Crevar (USA); New Wave Jiu Jitsu	
Women's -65 kg	(Brazil) Ana Carolina Vieira (BRA); GFTeam	(United States) Helena Crevar (USA); New Wave Jiu Jitsu	(Brazil) Beatriz Mesquita (BRA); Gracie Humaitá
Women's +65 kg	(Brazil) Rafaela Guedes (BRA); Atos Jiu-Jitsu	(Brazil) Nathiely de Jesus (BRA); Soul Fighters	
Women's +65 kg	(Brazil) Rafaela Guedes (BRA); Atos Jiu-Jitsu	(Brazil) Nathiely de Jesus (BRA); Soul Fighters	(United States) Kendall Reusing (USA); Gracie Barra
Women's Absolute	(Australia) Adele Fornarino (AUS); Dominance MMA	(Brazil) Beatriz Mesquita (BRA); Gracie Humaitá	
Women's Absolute	(Australia) Adele Fornarino (AUS); Dominance MMA	(Brazil) Beatriz Mesquita (BRA); Gracie Humaitá	(United States) Amy Campo (BRA); Zenith BJJ

=== ADCC 2022 ===
Event	Gold	Silver	Bronze
66 kg (146 lb)	Diogo Reis (BRA)	Gabriel Sousa (BRA)	Diego Pato (BRA)
77 kg (170 lb)	Kade Ruotolo (USA)	Mica Galvão (BRA)	Dante Leon (CAN)
88 kg (194 lb)	Giancarlo Bodoni (USA)	Lucas Barbosa (BRA)	Vagner Rocha (BRA)
99 kg (218 lb)	Kaynan Duarte (BRA)	Craig Jones (AUS)	Nicholas Meregali (BRA)
+99 kg (+218 lb)	Gordon Ryan (USA)	Nick Rodriguez (USA)	Roosevelt Souza (BRA)
Absolute	Yuri Simõess (BRA)	Nicholas Meregali (BRA)	Tye Ruotolo (USA)
Women's –60 kg (–132 lb)	Ffion Davies (GBR)	Brianna Ste-Marie (CAN)	Bia Mesquita (BRA)
Women's +60 kg (+132 lb)	Amy Campo (USA)	Rafaela Guedes (BRA)	Gabrielle Garcia (BRA)

=== ADCC 2019 ===
Event	Gold	Silver	Bronze
66 kg (146 lb)	Augusto Mendes (BRA)	Kennedy Maciel (USA)	Paulo Miyao (BRA)
77 kg (170 lb)	Jonathan Torres (USA)	Vagner Rocha (BRA)	Garry Tonon (USA)
88 kg (194 lb)	Matheus Diniz (BRA)	Craig Jones (AUS)	Josh Hinger (USA)
99 kg (218 lb)	Gordon Ryan (USA)	Vinicius Gazola (BRA)	Lucas Barbosa (BRA)
+99 kg (+218 lb)	Kaynan Duarte (BRA)	Nick Rodriguez (USA)	Marcus Almeida (BRA)
Absolute	Gordon Ryan (USA)	Marcus Almeida (BRA)	Lachlan Giles (AUS)
Women's –60 kg (–132 lb)	Bianca Basílio (BRA)	Ffion Davies (WAL)	Elvira Karppinen (FIN)
Women's +60 kg (+132 lb)	Gabrielle Garcia (BRA)	Carina Santi (BRA)	Tayane Porfirio (BRA)

==== Absolute ====
First round
Marcus Almeida	SUB
Keith Krikorian
Aaron Johnson	SUB
Jon Blank
Mahamed Aly	SUB
John Hansen
Tim Spriggs	SUB
Jared Dop
Gordon Ryan	SUB
Pedro Marinho
Garry Tonon	SUB
Edwin Najmi
Lachlan Giles	SUB
Kaynan Duarte
Patrick Gaudio	2-0
Mike Perez

Quarter-finals
Marcus Almeida	3-0
Aaron Johnson
Mahamed Aly	REF
Tim Spriggs
Gordon Ryan	SUB
Garry Tonon
Lachlan Giles	SUB
Patrick Gaudio

Semi-finals
Marcus Almeida	SUB
Mahamed Aly
Gordon Ryan	SUB
Lachlan Giles

Finals
Gordon Ryan	SCORE
Marcus Almeida

3rd Place
Lachlan Giles	SUB
Mahamed Aly

=== ADCC 2017 ===
Event	Gold	Silver	Bronze
66 kg	Rubens Charles (BRA)	AJ Agazarm (USA)	Paulo Miyao (BRA)
77 kg	Jonathan Torres (USA)	Lucas Lepri (BRA)	Vagner Rocha (BRA)
88 kg	Gordon Ryan (USA)	Keenan Cornelius (USA)	Alexandre Ribeiro (BRA)
99 kg	Yuri Simões (BRA)	Felipe Pena (BRA)	Jackson Souza (BRA)
+99 kg	Marcus Almeida (BRA)	Orlando Sanchez (USA)	Roberto Abreu (BRA)
Absolute	Felipe Pena (BRA)	Gordon Ryan (USA)	Marcus Almeida (BRA)
Women's 60 kg	Beatriz Mesquita (BRA)	Bianca Basílio (BRA)	Michelle Nicolini (BRA)
Women's +60 kg	Gabrielle Garcia (BRA)	Talita Nogueira (BRA)	Jéssica Flowers (BRA)

==== Absolute ====
First round
Victor Honório
Arman Zhanpeisov
Felipe Pena
Celso Vinicius
Alexandre Ribeiro	S (armbar)
Tero Pyylampi
Marcus Almeida
Mark Perez
Dillon Danis	S (guillotine)
Yukiyasu Ozawa
Mahamed Aly
Eliot Kelly
Gordon Ryan	S (heel hook)
Roberto Abreu
Craig Jones	S (heel hook)
Chael Sonnen

Quarter-finals
Victor Honório
Felipe Pena
Alexandre Ribeiro
Marcus Almeida
Dillon Danis
Mahamed Aly
Gordon Ryan	S (arm-triangle)
Craig Jones

Semi-finals
Felipe Pena	S (rnc)
Marcus Almeida
Mahamed Aly
Gordon Ryan	S (heel hook)

Finals
Felipe Pena
Gordon Ryan

3rd Place
Marcus Almeida	S (heel hook)
Mahamed Aly

=== ADCC 2015 ===
Event	Gold	Silver	Bronze
66 kg	Rubens Charles (BRA)	Bruno Frazatto (BRA)	Augusto Mendes (BRA)
77 kg	Davi Ramos (BRA)	Lucas Lepri (BRA)	Gilbert Burns (BRA)
88 kg	Yuri Simões (BRA)	Keenan Cornelius (USA)	Rustam Chsiev (RUS)
99 kg	Rodolfo Vieira (BRA)	Felipe Pena (BRA)	João Assis (BRA)
+99 kg	Orlando Sanchez (USA)	Jared Dopp (USA)	Vinny Magalhães (BRA)
Absolute	Claudio Calasans (BRA)	João Gabriel Rocha (BRA)	Rodolfo Vieira (BRA)
Women's 60 kg	Mackenzie Dern (USA)	Michelle Nicolini (BRA)	Tammi Musumeci (USA)
Women's +60 kg	Ana Laura Cordeiro (BRA)	Jessica Oliveira (BRA)	Gabrielle Garcia (BRA)

==== Absolute ====
First round
Dean Lister	SUB
Ricardo Mesquita
Vinny Magalhaes	PEN
Garry Tonon
Claudio Calasans	DEC
Gabriel Lucas
Yuri Simões	DEC
Hideki Sekine "Shrek"
Rodolfo Vieira	SUB
Benson Henderson
Rafael Lovato Jr.	5X0
Magomed Abdulkadirov
Vagner Rocha	2X0
Romulo Barral
Joao Gabriel Rocha	DEC
AJ Agazarm

Quarter-finals
Yuri Simões	5X3
Dean Lister
Claudio Calasans	DEC
Vinny Magalhaes
Rodolfo Vieira	5X0
Rafael Lovato Jr
Joao Gabriel Rocha	3X0
Vagner Rocha

Semi-finals
Claudio Calasans	DEC
Yuri Simões
Joao Gabriel Rocha	2X0
Rodolfo Vieira

Finals
Claudio Calasans	PEN
Joao Gabriel Rocha

3rd Place
Rodolfo Vieira	WO
Yuri Simoes

=== ADCC 2013 ===
Event	Gold	Silver	Bronze
66 kg	Rubens Charles (BRA)	Rafael Mendes (BRA)	Justin Rader (USA)
77 kg	Kron Gracie (BRA)	Otavio Souza (BRA)	Jonathan Torres (USA)
88 kg	Romulo Barral (BRA)	Rafael Lovato Jr. (USA)	Keenan Cornelius (USA)
99 kg	João Assis (BRA)	Dean Lister (USA)	Leo Nogueira (BRA)
+99 kg	Marcus Almeida (BRA)	João Gabriel (BRA)	Roberto Abreu (BRA)
Absolute	Roberto Abreu (BRA)	Marcus Almeida (BRA)	Keenan Cornelius (USA)
Women's 60 kg	Michelle Nicolini (BRA)	Luanna Alzuguir (BRA)	Seiko Yamamoto (JPN)
Women's +60 kg	Gabrielle Garcia (BRA)	Maria Malyjasiak (POL)	Tammy Griego (USA)

=== ADCC 2011 ===
Event	Gold	Silver	Bronze
66 kg	Rafael Mendes (BRA)	Rubens Charles (BRA)	Jeff Glover (USA)
77 kg	Marcelo Garcia (BRA)	Leo Vieira (BRA)	Kron Gracie (BRA)
88 kg	André Galvão (BRA)	Rousimar Palhares (BRA)	Pablo Popovitch (BRA)
99 kg	Dean Lister (USA)	João Assis (BRA)	Alexandre Ribeiro (BRA)
+99 kg	Vinny Magalhães (BRA)	Fabricio Werdum (BRA)	Roberto Abreu (BRA)
Absolute	André Galvão (BRA)	Pablo Popovitch (BRA)	Alexandre Ribeiro (BRA)

==== Absolute ====
First round
Joao Assis
Victor Estima
Pablo Popovitch
Janne-Pekka Pietiläinen
Bruno Frazzato
Gunnar Nelson
Jeff Monson
Xande Ribeiro	DQ
Vinny Magalhães
Bruno Bastos
Murilo Santana
Marko Helen
Sergio Moraes	S (Heel Hook)
Antonio Braga Neto
Shinsho Anzai
André Galvão	TS (RNC)

Quarter-finals
Victor Estima
Pablo Popovitch
Gunnar Nelson
Xande Ribeiro
Vinny Magalhães
Murilo Santana
Sergio Moraes
André Galvão

Semi-finals
Pablo Popovitch
Xande Ribeiro
Murilo Santana
André Galvão

Finals
Pablo Popovitch
André Galvão	S (Toe Hold)

3rd Place
Xande Ribeiro
Murilo Santana

==== Superfight ====
- Superfight 1: Braulio Estima vs. Ronaldo Souza

Estima defeated Souza via points (3-0).

- Superfight 2: Renzo Gracie vs. Mario Sperry

Sperry defeated Gracie via points (5-0).

=== ADCC 2009 ===
Event	Gold	Silver	Bronze
66 kg	Rafael Mendes (BRA)	Rubens Charles (BRA)	Ryan Hall (USA)
77 kg	Pablo Popovitch (BRA)	Marcelo Garcia (BRA)	Gregor Gracie (BRA)
88 kg	Braulio Estima (BRA)	André Galvão (BRA)	David Avellan (USA)
99 kg	Alexandre Ribeiro (BRA)	Gerardi Rinaldi (USA)	Vinny Magalhães (BRA)
+99 kg	Fabricio Werdum (BRA)	Roberto Abreu (BRA)	Jeff Monson (USA)
Absolute	Braulio Estima (BRA)	Alexandre Ribeiro (BRA)	Vinny Magalhães (BRA)

==== Absolute ====
First round
Marcelo Garcia	S (RNC)
Bruno Bastos
Braulio Estima	S (Armbar)
Janne-Pekka Pietiläinen
Dean Lister
Vinny Magalhaes
Chris Weidman
Antonie Jaoude
Xande Ribeiro	S (Armlock)
Ricco Rodriguez
Tom De Blass
Andre Galvao
Jeff Monson
Gunnar Nelson
Roberto Abreu
David Avallen

Quarter-finals
Marcelo Garcia
Braulio Estima	S (RNC)
Vinny Magalhaes	S (Flying Armbar)
Chris Weidman
Xande Ribeiro
Andre Galvao
Gunnar Nelson	S (RNC)
David Avellan

Semi-finals
Braulio Estima
Vinny Magalhaes
Xande Ribeiro	S (Kneebar)
Gunnar Nelson

Finals
Braulio Estima	TS (Injury)
Xande Ribeiro

3rd Place
Vinny Magalhaes
Gunnar Nelson

==== Superfight ====
- Superfight: Robert Drysdale vs. Ronaldo Souza

Souza defeated Drysdale via points (2-0).

=== ADCC 2007 ===
Event	Gold	Silver	Bronze
66 kg	Rani Yahya (BRA)	Leo Vieira (BRA)	Baret Yoshida (USA)
77 kg	Marcelo Garcia (BRA)	Pablo Popovitch (BRA)	André Galvão (BRA)
88 kg	Demian Maia (BRA)	Flavio Almeida (BRA)	Tarsis Humphreys (BRA)
99 kg	Alexandre Ribeiro (BRA)	Braulio Estima (BRA)	Robert Drysdale (USA)
+99 kg	Fabricio Werdum (BRA)	Rolles Gracie (BRA)	Marcio Cruz (BRA)
Absolute	Robert Drysdale (USA)	Marcelo Garcia (BRA)	André Galvão (BRA)

=== ADCC 2005 ===
Event	Gold	Silver	Bronze
66 kg	Leo Vieira (BRA)	Rani Yahya (BRA)	Marcio Feitosa (BRA)
77 kg	Marcelo Garcia (BRA)	Pablo Popovitch (BRA)	Jake Shields (USA)
88 kg	Ronaldo Souza (BRA)	Demian Maia (BRA)	Saulo Ribeiro (BRA)
99 kg	Roger Gracie (BRA)	Alexandre Ferreira (BRA)	Alexandre Ribeiro (BRA)
+99 kg	Jeff Monson (USA)	Gabriel Gonzaga (BRA)	Fabricio Werdum (BRA)
Absolute	Roger Gracie (BRA)	Ronaldo Souza (BRA)	Marcelo Garcia (BRA)
Women's 60 kg	Kyra Gracie (BRA)		
Women's +60 kg	Juliana Borges (BRA)		

=== ADCC 2003 ===
Event	Gold	Silver	Bronze
66 kg	Leo Vieira (BRA)	Baret Yoshida (USA)	Royler Gracie (BRA)
77 kg	Marcelo Garcia (BRA)	Otto Olson (USA)	Vítor Ribeiro (BRA)
88 kg	Saulo Ribeiro (BRA)	Ronaldo Souza (BRA)	David Terrell (USA)
99 kg	Jon Olav Einemo (NOR)	Alexandre Ferreira (BRA)	Roger Gracie (BRA)
+99 kg	Marcio Cruz (BRA)	Fabricio Werdum (BRA)	Alex Negão (BRA)
Absolute	Dean Lister (USA)	Alexandre Ferreira (BRA)	Fabricio Werdum (BRA)

=== ADCC 2001 ===
Event	Gold	Silver	Bronze
66 kg	Royler Gracie (BRA)	Baret Yoshida (USA)	Robson Moura (BRA)
77 kg	Marcio Feitosa (Note: Matt Serra lost to Feitosa in what appeared to be a very controversial decision. When two practitioners from the same school meet each other in a tournament, the lower ranking student in that school's hierarchy will generally forfeit the match out of respect.) (BRA)	Matt Serra (USA)	Leandro Silva (BRA)
88 kg	Sanae Kikuta (JPN)	Saulo Ribeiro (BRA)	Nino Schembri (BRA)
99 kg	Ricardo Arona (BRA)	Ricardo Almeida (BRA)	Alexandre Ferreira (BRA)
+99 kg	Mark Robinson (RSA)	Jeff Monson (USA)	Marcio Cruz (BRA)
Absolute	Ricardo Arona (BRA)	Jean Jacques Machado (BRA)	Vitor Belfort (BRA)

=== ADCC 2000 ===
Event	Gold	Silver	Bronze
66 kg	Royler Gracie (BRA)	Alexandre Freitas (BRA)	Joe Gilbert (USA)
77 kg	Renzo Gracie (BRA)	Jean Jacques Machado (BRA)	Marcio Feitosa (BRA)
88 kg	Saulo Ribeiro (BRA)	Ricardo Liborio (BRA)	Aleksandr Savko (BLR)
99 kg	Ricardo Arona (BRA)	Jeff Monson (USA)	Tito Ortiz (USA)
+99 kg	Mark Kerr (USA)	Ricco Rodriguez (USA)	Rigan Machado (BRA)
Absolute	Mark Kerr (USA)	Sean Alvarez (USA)	Ricardo Almeida (BRA)

=== ADCC 1999 ===
Event	Gold	Silver	Bronze
66 kg	Royler Gracie (BRA)	Alexandre Freitas (BRA)	Alexander Plavski (BLR)
77 kg	Jean Jacques Machado (BRA)	Caol Uno (JPN)	Hayato Sakurai (JPN)
88 kg	Karimula Barkalaev (RUS)	Aleksandr Savko (BLR)	Ricardo Liborio (BRA)
99 kg	Jeff Monson (USA)	Saulo Ribeiro (USA)	Ricardo Almeida (BRA)
+99 kg	Mark Kerr (USA)	Sean Alvarez (USA)	Chris Haseman (AUS)
Absolute	Roberto Traven (BRA)	Hayato Sakurai (JPN)	Ricco Rodriguez (USA)

=== ADCC 1998 ===
Event	Gold	Silver	Bronze
66 kg	Alexandre Freitas (BRA)	Robin Gracie (BRA)	Alexander Plavski (BLR)
77 kg	Renzo Gracie (BRA)	Luis Brito (BRA)	Fabiano Iha (BRA)
88 kg	Rodrigo Gracie (BRA)	Karimula Barkalaev (RUS)	Ahmed Faraj (EGY)
99 kg	Mario Sperry (BRA)	Ricardo Alves (BRA)	Bueau Hershberger (USA)
+99 kg	Ricco Rodriguez (USA)	Sean Alvarez (USA)	Simon Siasi (ITA)
Absolute	Mario Sperry (BRA)	Ricardo Moraes (BRA)	Simon Siasi (ITA)

== ADCC Trials ==
=== ADCC Asian and Oceania Championship ===
Year	Host	Men's 66 kg	Men's 77 kg	Men's 88 kg	Men's 99 kg	Men's +99 kg	Women's -55 kg	Women's -65 kg	Women's +65 kg
2008	Sydney	David Marinakis (1/2)	Rodney Ellis (1/1)	Igor Praporshchikov (1/2)	Anthony Perosh (1/1)	Denis Roberts (1/2)			
2009	Tokyo	Kouhei Yasumi (1/1)	Keita Nakamura (1/1)	Kazuhiro Nakamura (1/1)	Shinsho Anzai (1/2)	Ukiya Naito (1/1)			
2010	Sydney	David Marinakis (2/2)	David Hart (1/1)	Cameron Rowe (1/1)	Igor Praporshchikov (2/2)	Mick Wilson (1/1)			
2011	Tokyo	Tetsu Hadairo (1/1)	Takanori Gomi (1/1)	Jeon Doo Kwang (1/1)	Shinsho Anzai (1/2)	Hideki Sekine (1/4)			
2012	Manila	Robert Sabaruddin (1/1)	Young-am Noh (1/2)	Doorwang Jeon (1/1)	Alan Drueco (1/1)	Michael Wilson (1/1)			
2013	Tokyo	Ulka Sasaki (1/1)	Sotaro Yamada (1/1)	Shinsho Anzai (2/2)	Yukiyasu Ozawa (1/3)	Hideki Sekine (2/4)			
2014	Seoul	Tezekbaev Rasul (1/1)	Lachlan Giles (1/3)	Craig Jones (1/2)	Tobias Green (1/1)	Lee Hyoung-Chul (1/1)			
2015	Tokyo	Yuto Hirao (1/1)	Young-am Noh (2/2)	Hidemi Mihara (1/1)	Yukiyasu Ozawa (2/3)	Hideki Sekine (3/4)			
2016	Almaty	Uranov Zhakshylyk (1/1)	Lachlan Giles (2/3)	Craig Jones (2/2)	Roman Dolidze (1/1)	Sulimanov Mokhmad (1/1)			
2017	Tokyo	Yuta Shimada (1/1)	Osmanzhan Kassimov (1/1)	Kit Dale (1/1)	Yukiyasu Ozawa (3/3)	Hideki Sekine (4/4)			
2019	Tokyo	Kenta Iwamoto (1/3)	Lachlan Giles (3/3)	Keller Locke-Sodhi (1/1)	Jacob Malkoun (1/1)	Denis Roberts (2/2)			
2022	Stanhope	Jeremy Skinner (1/1)	Kenta Iwamoto (2/3)	Roberto Dib Frias (1/2)	Izaak Michell (1/3)	Josh Saunders (1/2)			
2023	Singapore	Ethan Thomas (1/1)	Kenta Iwamoto (3/3)	Izaak Michell (2/3)	Declan Moody (1/1)	Josh Saunders (2/2)			
2024	Bangkok	Huaiqing Xu (1/1)	Levi Jones-Leary (1/1)	Lucas Kanard (1/1)	Daniel Schuardt (1/2)	Mansur Makhmakhanov (1/1)	Adele Fornarino (1/1)	Sula-Mae Loewenthal (1/1)	Nikki Lloyd-Griffiths (1/1)
2025	Bangkok	Ryoma Anraku (1/1)	Izaak Michell (3/3)	Jozef Chen (1/1)	Nicholas Maglicic (1/1)	Tito John Carle (1/1)			
2026	Carrara	Bekzat Kapashov (1/1)	Kaya Rudolph (1/1)	Roberto Dib Frias (2/2)	Daniel Schuardt (2/2)	Belal Etiabari (1/1)	Kanae Ikeda (1/1)	Nadia Frankland (1/1)	Matilda Reid (1/1)

=== ADCC European Championship ===
Year	Host	Men's 66 kg	Men's 77 kg	Men's 88 kg	Men's 99 kg	Men's +99 kg	Women's -60 kg	Women's +60 kg	Women's -55 kg	Women's -65 kg	Women's +65 kg
2003	Turku	Teemu Launis (1/2)	Jussi Tammelin (1/1)	Robert Sulski (1/1)	Ilir Latifi (1/1)	Mark Ilman (1/1)					
2005	Stockholm	Toni Kröger (1/1)	Martin Lindqvist (1/1)	Marko Helen (1/3)	Alistair Overeem (1/1)	Mostapha al-Turk (1/1)					
2007	Turku	Teemu Launis (2/2)	Eduardo Rios (1/2)	Marko Helen (2/3)	Radek Turek (1/2)	Janne-Pekka Pietiläinen (1/6)	Caoimhe McGill (1/1)	Marloes Coenen (1/1)			
2008	Kraków	Timo Hirvikangas (1/3)	Toni Linden (1/1)	Trond Saksenvik (1/1)	Andreas Olsen (1/1)	Janne-Pekka Pietiläinen (2/6)	Ina Steffensen (1/1)	Shanti Abelha (1/1)			
2009	Stockholm	Nicolas Renier (1/3)	Marcelo Azevedo (1/1)	Kassim Annan (1/1)	Radek Turek (2/2)	Tomasz Janiszewski (1/1)	Laurence Cousin (1/1)	Ida Hannson (1/1)			
2010	Zagreb	Greger Forsell (1/1)	Jorge Britto (1/1)	Marko Helen (3/3)	Kari Peltola (1/1)	Janne-Pekka Pietiläinen (3/6)					
2011	Turku	Timo Hirvikangas (2/3)	Dan Strauss (1/1)	Zybi Tyszka (1/2)	Kamil Uminski (1/4)	Janne-Pekka Pietiläinen (4/6)	Sara Svensson (1/1)	Devi Ahuja (1/1)			
2012	Ljubljana	Timo Hirvikangas (3/3)	Tero Pyylampi (1/2)	Eduardo Rios (2/2)	Tomasz Narkun (1/2)	Alexander Trans (1/2)		Maria Malyjasiak (1/2)			
2013	Kraków	Nicolas Renier (2/3)	Kamil Mitosek (1/1)	Łukasz Michalec (1/1)	Kamil Uminski (2/4)	Janne-Pekka Pietiläinen (5/6)	Laura Hondorp (1/1)	Maria Malyjasiak (2/2)			
2014	Sofia	Asadulaev Surkhay (1/1)	Mateusz Gamrot (1/2)	Zybi Tyszka (2/2)	Tomasz Narkun (2/2)	Alexander Trans (2/2)	Vanessa English (1/1)	Sophia Nordenö (1/2)			
2015	Turku	Nicolas Renier (3/3)	Magomed Abdulkadirov (1/1)	Jesse Urholin (1/2)	Kamil Uminski (3/4)	Janne-Pekka Pietiläinen (6/6)	Kethe Engen (1/1)	Sophia Nordenö (2/2)			
2016	Mainz	Janusz Andrejczuk (1/1)	Tero Pyylampi (2/2)	Jesse Urholin (2/2)	Kamil Uminski (4/4)	Khamzat Stambulov (1/1)	Elvira Karppinen (1/1)	Stephanie Egger (1/2)			
2017	Poznań	Kuba Witkowski (1/1)	Oliver Taza (1/2)	Piotr Fręchowicz (1/1)	Abdurakhman Bilarov (1/1)	Abdulaev Ruslan (1/1)	Ffion Davies (1/1)	Samantha Cook (1/1)			
2018	Bucharest	Zaur Akhmedov (1/1)	Ross Nicholls (1/1)	Adam Wardziński (1/1)	Perttu Tepponen (1/2)	Eldar Rafigaev (1/1)	Maiju Suotama (1/1)	Yulia Vibe (1/1)			
2019	Poznań	Tom Halpin (1/1)	Mateusz Gamrot (2/2)	Ben Dyson (1/1)	Mraz Avdoyan (1/1)	Mateusz Juskowiak (1/1)	Livia Giles (1/1)	Stephanie Egger (2/2)			
2021	Poznań	Ash Williams (1/1)	Oliver Taza (2/2)	Eoghan O'Flanagan (1/2)	Perttu Tepponen (2/2)	Heikki Jussila (1/2)	Peyton Letcher (1/1)	Magdalena Loska (1/1)			
2022	Poznań	Sam McNally (1/1)	Tommy Langaker (1/2)	Santeri Lilius (1/2)	Luke Griffith (1/2)	Daniel Manasoiu (1/1)	Julia Mæle (1/1)	Eleftheria Christodoulou (1/1)			
2023	Warsaw	Owen Jones (1/1)	Jozef Chen (1/1)	Santeri Lilius (2/2)	Luke Griffith (2/2)	Heikki Jussila (2/2)			Josefine Modig (1/1)	Sani Brännfors (1/1)	Ane Svendsen (1/1)
2024	Zagreb	Gairbeg Ibragimov (1/1)	Tommy Langaker (2/2)	Taylor Pearman (1/1)	Marcin Maciulewicz (1/1)	Mark Macqueen (1/2)			Margot Ciccarelli (1/1)	Aurelie Le Vern (1/1)	Nia Blackman (1/1)
2025	Warsaw	Nikodem Mikuliszyn (1/1)	Magomed Dzharbaev (1/1)	Pawel Jaworski (1/1)	Declan Moody (1/1)	Mark Macqueen (2/2)			Ana Mayordomo (1/1)	Injana Goodman (1/1)	Jessika Torttila (1/1)
2026	Belgrade	Yigit Hanay (1/1)	Nikolay Vetrov (1/1)	Marlon Tajik (1/1)	Eoghan O'Flanagan (2/2)	Haisam Rida (1/1)			Janette Gloger (1/1)	Injana Goodman (2/2)	Anabel Lopez (1/1)

=== ADCC North American Championship ===
Year	Host	Men's 66 kg	Men's 77 kg	Men's 88 kg	Men's 99 kg	Men's +99 kg	Women's -60 kg	Women's +60 kg	Women's -55 kg	Women's -65 kg	Women's +65 kg
2002	Los Angeles, CA	Eddie Bravo (1/1)	Pablo Popovitch (1/1)	Denis Kang (1/1)	Dean Lister (1/1)	Sean Alvarez (1/1)					
2004	Vernon, BC	Javier Vazquez (1/1)	Cameron Earle (1/1)	Marcos Avellan (1/1)	Jamal Patterson (1/1)	Karim Byron (1/1)					
2007	Wayne, NJ	Sim Go (1/1)	Mark Bocek (1/1)	Chris Moriarty (1/1)	Misha Cirkunov (1/1)	Mario Rinaldi (1/2)					
2008	Newark, NJ	Ryan Hall (1/1)	Don Ortega (1/1)	Jason Selva (1/1)	Rafael Davies (1/1)	Asa Fuller (1/1)	Hillary Williams (1/1)	Lana Stefanac (1/1)			
2009	Los Angeles, CA	Jayson Patino (1/1)	Enrico Cocco (1/3)	Chris Weidman (1/1)	Gerardi Rinaldi (1/1)	Tom DeBlass (1/3)					
2010	Belleville, NJ	Mark Ramos (1/2)	Vagner Rocha (1/3)	Rustam Chsiev (1/1)	Joseph Lee Baize (1/1)	Mario Rinaldi (2/2)	Cat Zingano (1/1)	Penny Thomas (1/1)			
2011	San Diego, CA	Jeff Glover (1/1)	Enrico Cocco (2/3)	JJ Holmes (1/1)	James Puopolo (1/2)	Jared Rosholt (1/1)					
2012	San Diego, CA	Darson Hemmings (1/1)	AJ Agazarm (1/1)	Keenan Cornelius (1/1)	Adam Sachnoff (1/1)	Jared Dopp (1/1)	Mackenzie Dern (1/1)	Brea Gibert (1/1)			
2013	Columbus, Ohio	Mark Ramos (2/2)	Garry Tonon (1/1)	Josh Hayden (1/1)	James Puopolo (2/2)	Robby Donofrio (1/1)					
2014	Nitro, WV	Geo Martinez (1/1)	Enrico Cocco (3/3)	Matt Arroyo (1/1)	Tom DeBlass (2/3)	Jason Lee (1/1)					
2015	Coconut Creek, FL	Edward Cummings (1/1)	Vagner Rocha (2/3)	Mike Perez (1/2)	Jason Bukich (1/1)	Paul Ardila (1/4)	Tammi Musumeci (1/1)	Amanda Alequin (1/1)			
2016	Bayville, NJ	Justin Rader (1/1)	Mansher Khera (1/1)	Elliot Kelly (1/1)	James Brasco (1/1)	Tom DeBlass (3/3)					
2017	Anaheim, CA	Ethan Crelinsten (1/2)	Vagner Rocha (3/3)	John Salter (1/1)	Paul Ardila (2/4)	Casey Hellenberg (1/1)	Elisabeth Clay (1/1)	Tara White (1/1)			
2018	Bayville, NJ	Ethan Crelinsten (2/2)	Jonathan Satava (1/1)	Alec Baulding (1/1)	Tim Spriggs (1/1)	Aaron Johnson (1/1)					
2019	Burbank, CA	Nicky Ryan (1/1)	John Combs (1/1)	Josh Hinger (1/1)	Mason Fowler (1/2)	Nick Rodriguez (1/1)	Jena Bishop (1/1)	Amanda Leve (1/1)			
2021	Atlantic City, NJ	Cole Abate (1/1)	Kade Ruotolo (1/1)	Giancarlo Bodoni (1/1)	Mason Fowler (2/2)	John Hansen (1/1)	Brianna Ste-Marie (1/2)	Kendall Reusing (1/1)			
2022	Las Vegas, NV	Keith Krikorian (1/1)	William Tackett (1/2)	Jay Rodriguez (1/1)	Paul Ardila (3/4)	Kyle Boehm (1/1)	Brianna Ste-Marie (2/2)	Amy Campo (1/1)			
2023	Atlantic City, NJ	Dorian Olivarez (1/2)	Elijah Dorsey (1/1)	Jacob Couch (1/1)	Paul Ardila (4/4)	Dan Manasoiu (1/1)			Alex Enriquez (1/1)	Morgan Black (1/2)	Amanda Leve (1/1)
2024	Las Vegas, NV	Deandre Corbe (1/1)	Andrew Tackett (1/1)	William Tackett (2/2)	Michael Pixley (1/1)	Mike Perez (2/2)			Jasmine Rocha (1/1)	Helena Crevar (1/1)	Elizabeth Mitrovic (1/2)
2025	Orlando, FL	Dorian Olivarez (2/2)	Jacob Bornemann (1/1)	Jon Blank (1/1)	Achilles Rocha (1/1)	Brandon Reed (1/1)			Ana Mayordomo (1/1)	Morgan Black (2/2)	Maia Matalon (1/1)
2026	Pomona, CA	Gianni Grippo (1/1)	Michael Sainz (1/1)	Nathan Haddad (1/1)	Elder Cruz (1/1)	Nick Hartman (1/1)			Sheliah Lindsey (1/1)	Sarah Galvao (1/1)	Paige Ivette Borras (1/1)

=== ADCC South American Championship ===
Year	Host	Men's 66 kg	Men's 77 kg	Men's 88 kg	Men's 99 kg	Men's +99 kg	Women's -60 kg	Women's +60 kg	Women's -55 kg	Women's -65 kg	Women's +65 kg
2003	Rio de Janeiro	Rani Yahya (1/2)	Daniel Moraes (1/1)	Ronaldo Souza (1/1)	Alexandre Ferreira (1/1)	Márcio Cruz (1/1)					
2004	Campos	Rani Yahya (2/2)	Roan Carneiro (1/1)	Demian Maia (1/1)	Roger Gracie (1/1)	Gabriel Gonzaga (1/1)					
2007	Rio de Janeiro	Bruno Frazzato (1/2)	André Galvão (1/2)	Delson Heleno (1/1)	Cristiano Lazzarini (1/1)	Luiz Felipe (1/1)					
2009	Rio de Janeiro	Rafael Mendes (1/1)	Murilo Santana (1/3)	André Galvão (2/2)	Glover Teixeira (1/1)	Antoine Jaoude (1/1)	Ana Michelle Tavares (1/2)	Rosângela Conceição (1/1)			
2011	Rio de Janeiro	Bruno Frazzato (2/2)	Murilo Santana (2/3)	Claudio Calasans (1/3)	Augusto Ferrari (1/1)	Gabriel Vella (1/1)	Michelle Nicolini (1/2)	Talita Nogueira (1/2)			
2013	Rio de Janeiro	João Miyao (1/1)	Leonardo Nogueira (1/1)	Claudio Calasans (2/3)	João Gabriel Rocha (1/1)	Rodrigo Cavaca (1/1)	Michelle Nicolini (2/2)	Fernanda Mazzelli (1/2)			
2015	Rio de Janeiro	Renan Sancar (1/1)	Davi Ramos (1/1)	Felipe Pena (1/1)	Roberto Alencar (1/1)	Leandro Lo (1/1)	Ana Michelle Tavares (2/2)	Fernanda Mazzelli (2/2)			
2015	São Paulo	Gabriel Marangoni (1/1)	Gabriel Rollo (1/1)	Claudio Calasans (3/3)	Cassio Silva (1/1)	Gabriel Lucas (1/1)	Marya Mazza (1/1)	Jéssica Flowers (1/1)			
2016	São Paulo	Pablo Mantovani (1/1)	Felipe Cesar (1/1)	Murilo Santana (3/3)	Mahamed Aly (1/1)	Luiz Panza (1/1)	Bianca Basílio (1/1)	Talita Nogueira (2/2)			
2017	Rio de Janeiro	Paulo Miyao (1/1)	Marcelo Mafra (1/1)	Kaynan Casemiro (1/1)	Salomão Ribeiro (1/1)	Victor Honório (1/2)					
2019	São Paulo	Ruan Alvarenga (1/1)	Servio Tulio (1/1)	Gabriel Almeida (1/1)	Paulo Jose (1/1)	Antônio Braga Neto (1/1)	Franciele Nascimento (1/1)	Carina Santi (1/1)			
2022	Balneário Camboriú	Diogo Reis (1/1)	Michael Galvão (1/1)	Isaque Bahiense (1/1)	João Costa (1/1)	Roosevelt Sousa (1/2)	Daiana Torquato (1/1)	Rebecca Albuquerque (1/1)			
2022	São Paulo	Fabricio Andrey (1/2)	Roberto Jimenez (1/1)	Alexandre de Jesus (1/2)	Henrique Ceconi (1/2)	Gutemberg Pereira (1/1)	Mayssa Bastos (1/2)	Giovanna Jara (1/1)			
2024	Belo Horizonte	Kennedy Maciel (1/1)	Luiz Paulo Medeiros (1/1)	Charles Negromonte (1/1)	Cassio Costa (1/1)	Jose Inacio Dos Santos (1/1)					
2024	São Paulo	Fabricio Andrey (2/2)	Alexandre de Jesus (2/2)	Pedro Marinho (1/1)	Henrique Ceconi (2/2)	Victor Honório (2/2)			Anna Rodrigues (1/1)	Ana Vieira (1/1)	Maria Ruffatto (1/1)
2026	Rio de Janeiro	David Mateus Santos (1/1)	Julio Cesar Suzigan Martins (1/1)	Franco Diaz (1/1)	Elioenai Julio Souza Braz (1/1)	Roosevelt Sousa (2/2)					
2026	Indaiatuba	Kauã Gabriel (1/1)	Alexandre de Jesus (2/2)	Gustavo Batista (1/1)	Vinicius Lessa (1/1)	Pedro Lucas (1/1)			Mayssa Bastos (2/2)	Livia Barasine (1/1)	Yara Soares (1/1)

== Awards ==
At the end of 2021, ADCC was awarded with 'Promotion of the year' by media outlet Jitsmagazine at the 2021 BJJ Awards as a result of the trials events held that year and the introduction of the ADCC Hall of Fame.

In 2022, ADCC was awarded with 'Promotion of the Year' by Jitsmagazine at the 2022 BJJ Awards for the second year in a row, and the 2022 ADCC World Championships was awarded with 'Fight Card of the Year'.

== See also ==
- ADCC weight classes
- List of ADCC Hall of Fame inductees
