= Yuri Simões =

Brazilian mixed martial artist

- Born: Yuri Costa Simões Martins da Silva; June 18, 1990 (age 36); Rio de Janeiro, Brazil
- Height: 6 ft 0 in (1.83 m)
- Weight: 185 lb (84 kg; 13 st 3 lb)
- Division: Light Heavyweight; Middleweight
- Style: Brazilian Jiu Jitsu
- Stance: Orthodox
- Fighting out of: San Jose, California, United States
- Team: American Kickboxing Academy (2015–present)
- Rank: 3rd degree black belt in Brazilian Jiu Jitsu under Ricardo Vieira
- Years active: 2020–present (MMA)

Mixed martial arts record
- Total: 2
- Wins: 0
- Losses: 2
- By decision: 2

Other information
- Mixed martial arts record from Sherdog

Yuri Simões (born June 18, 1990) is a Brazilian grappler, BJJ practitioner and mixed martial artist who has competed in the ONE Championship. He is a three time ADCC World Champion in two different weight divisions.

== Early life and education ==
Simões started training judo at the age of four, transitioning to Brazilian jiu-jitsu at the age of nine. He received his black belt from Ricardo Vieira in 2011, and in 2013 he changed teams to train under Caio Terra.

== Martial arts career ==
=== Grappling career ===
Simões won his first ADCC medal in 2015, when he won the 2015 ADCC 88 kg gold medal. During the tournament, he managed to beat Keenan Cornelius, Romulo Barral, Zbigniew Tyszka and Ricardo Mesquita. He took part in the 2017 edition of the ADCC as well, competing in the 99 kg weight category. Yuri beat Roman Dolidze by points in the opening round, Mike Perez by decision in the quarterfinals, Jackson Sousa by points in the semifinals and Felipe Pena by points in the finals, to once again win the gold medal.

Simões also won four gold medals in the World No-Gi Brazilian Jiu-Jitsu Championship, winning the gold medal in both his and the absolute weight categories, in both 2014 and 2016. Simões won his third ADCC title, this time in Absolute after defeating Lachlan Giles, Nick Rodriguez, Roberto Abreu and Nicholas Meregali in the final of the 2022 ADCC World Championship.

Simões competed against Nick Rodriguez at UFC Fight Pass Invitational 5 on December 10, 2023. He lost the match on points. After the match Simões revealed that he had suffered a shoulder injury in training and would need surgery to repair it, keeping him out of competition while he recovers.

=== Mixed martial arts ===
Having begun training martial arts several years prior, he announced in August 2020 that he had signed with ONE Championship. His first fight was announced for ONE Championship: Inside the Matrix 3, where was scheduled take on Fan Rong on November 13, 2020. Yuri lost his promotional debut by unanimous decision.

He was scheduled to face Daniyal Zainalov at ONE: Full Circle on February 25, 2022. Simões lost by split decision.

After suffering two straight losses to start his MMA career, he was released by ONE.

== Mixed martial arts record ==
Professional record breakdown
2 matches	0 wins	2 losses
By decision	0	2

Res.	Record	Opponent	Method	Event	Date	Round	Time	Location	Notes
Loss	0–2	Daniyal Zainalov	Decision (split)	ONE: Full Circle	February 25, 2022	3	5:00	Kallang, Singapore	Middleweight debut.
Loss	0–1	Fan Rong	Decision (unanimous)	ONE: Inside the Matrix 3	November 13, 2020	3	5:00	Kallang, Singapore	Light Heavyweight debut.
