= Hannette Staack =

Brazilian martial artist

- Born: February 7, 1979 (age 47); São Luís do Maranhão, Maranhão, Brazil
- Other names: Hannette Quadros Staack
- Nationality: Brazilian /American
- Style: Brazilian Jiu-Jitsu
- Rank: 4th deg. BJJ black belt

Other information
- Website: hannettestaackbjj
- Mixed martial arts record from Sherdog

Hannette Staack (born February 7, 1979) is a Brazilian submission grappler and 4th degree Brazilian Jiu-Jitsu (BJJ) black belt practitioner and coach. A three-time ADCC champion and five-time IBJJF World Champion, Staack is a member of the IBJJF Hall of Fame and is regarded as one of the most accomplished female grapplers in the history of the sport.

== Biography ==
Hannette Quadros Staack was born on 7 February 1979 in São Luís do Maranhão, northern Brazil at the age of two her family moved to Rio de Janeiro. Staack began training jiu-jitsu when she was 18, five years later in 2002, she won her first world championship. Staack competed in the first women's divisions at the ADCC World Championships on May 27 and 28, 2005. She lost to Juliana Borges in the opening round of the over 60 kg division.

Together with her professor and business partner Andre "Negão" Terencio she founded Brazil 021 School of Jiu-Jitsu. In October 2022, Staack made her professional MMA debut in Rio de Janeiro submitting her opponent in under three minutes.

== Championships and accomplishments ==
Main Achievements:

- 5 x IBJJF World Jiu-Jitsu Champion (2002 / 2004 / 2008 / 2009 / 2011)
- 3 x ADCC Submission Fighting World World Champion (2007 (Note: Weight and Absolute) / 2009)
- CBJJ Brazilian Nationals Champion (2003 brown)
- 2nd place IBJJF World Championship (2006 / 2014)
- 2nd place ADCC World Championship (2011)
- 2nd place IBJJF World No-Gi Champion (2007)
- 3rd place IBJJF World Championship (2005 / 2013)

== Mixed martial arts record ==
Professional record breakdown
1 match	1 win	0 losses
By submission	1	0

Res.	Record	Opponent	Method	Event	Date	Round	Time	Location	Notes
Win	1–0	Lorrany Maui	Submission (Kimura)	Shooto Brazil 111 - Macapa x Bad Boy	October 28, 2022	1	2:39	Rio de Janeiro, Brazil	

== See also ==
- List of Brazilian Jiu-Jitsu practitioners
