= Pawel Jaworski =

Polish submission grappler

Paweł Jaworski
- Born: June 23, 2004 (age 22); Mława, Poland
- Nationality: Polish
- Style: Brazilian jiu-jitsu
- Team: Academia Gorila
- Rank: Black belt in Brazilian jiu-jitsu under Jędrzej Loska and Marcin Polczyk

Paweł Jaworski (born 23 June 2004 in Mława) is a Polish submission grappler and Brazilian jiu-jitsu black belt. He won the men's −88 kg division at the 2026 ADCC World Championship, becoming the first Polish competitor to win an ADCC world title. He is also the first male to complete the IBJJF No-Gi Grand Slam.

== Early life ==
Jaworski grew up in Mława, Poland. He began training in judo at six years old, doing so until he was eleven, before taking up Brazilian jiu-jitsu at the Husaria Mława club.

== Grappling career ==
Jaworski joined Academia Gorila after initially training there while holding a purple belt. He received his black belt from Jędrzej Loska and Marcin Polczyk in December 2024.

In 2025, he won titles at the International Brazilian Jiu-Jitsu Federation major events including the World No-Gi (gold at –85 kg and silver in absolute), Pan No-Gi (gold at –85 kg and bronze in absolute), and European No-Gi championships (gold at –85 kg and absolute). He also won the −88 kg division at the ADCC Europe, Middle East and Africa Trials, qualifying for the 2026 world championship.

On 28 June 2026, Jaworski won double gold at the 2026 CBJJ Brazilian No-Gi Jiu-Jitsu Championship (also known as Brasileiro No-Gi) in the –85 kg division and absolute division. On 13 September 2026, he won the −88 kg title at the ADCC World Championship in Kraków, Poland. He submitted his first three opponents with leg locks before defeating Marlon Tajik in the final by a penalty. The victory made him Poland's first ADCC world champion. On 4 October 2026, he won double gold at the 2026 IBJJF Pan No-Gi Championship in the –85 kg division and the absolute division. On 1 November 2026, Jaworski won double gold at the 2026 IBJJF European No-Gi Championship in the –85 kg division and the absolute division. He became the first male to complete the IBJJF No-Gi Grand Slam.
