= Jayson Patino =

American Jiu jitsu practitioner (born 1983)

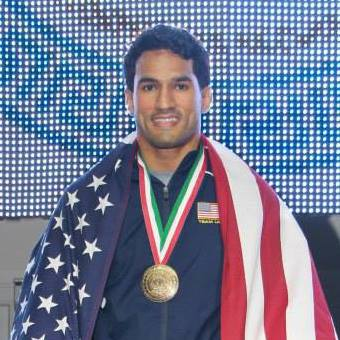
- Patino at the 2014 FILA World Championship
- Born: Jayson Alexis Patino; July 30, 1983
- Other names: El Bigote, Hollywood
- Nationality: American
- Height: 5 ft 9 in (175 cm)
- Weight: 155 lb (70 kg; 11 st 1 lb)
- Division: Lightweight
- Style: Brazilian Jiu Jitsu, Wrestling
- Team: American Top Team
- Teacher: Ricardo Liborio
- Rank: Black Belt Brazilian Jiu Jitsu

Other information
- University: UCF
- Notable school: American Top Team East Orlando
- Website: www.mmaorlando.com

Jayson Patino (born July 30, 1983) is an American Brazilian Jiu Jitsu practitioner who holds a black belt under Ricardo Liborio of American Top Team. He is known for his competitive achievements in FILA Pankration Submission, ADCC, IBJJF, and other grappling tournaments. He is also owner of American Top Team East Orlando.

== Background ==
Jayson Patino is a professional martial arts instructor, mixed martial artist, world class grappler, nutrition and strength & conditioning specialist. Patino started training in martial arts at age 4. Patino has fought in the World Extreme Fighting Championships, Cage Warriors, and Combat fighting Championship just to name a few. Patino is a black belt in Brazilian Jiu Jitsu under Ricardo Liborio, a member of the US Grappling World Team, FILA Pankration Submission World Champion, and a restricted Black belt in Taekwondo. Patino won the lightweight Pro Division at the 2009 Abu Dhabi Combat Club North American Trials and was one of 16 grapplers worldwide to compete at the ADCC World Championships in Barcelona, Spain. Patino wrestled at the University of Central Florida where he was a 2x All American and earned a degree in Social Science Education.

== Mixed martial arts career ==
Patino is 3–2 in his mixed martial arts career

Result	Fighter	Event	Method/Referee	Round	Time
Loss	Robert Goodridge	CWFC USA - Unleashed Aug / 23 / 2008	TKO (Doctor Stoppage) N/A	2	1:46
Loss	Eduardo Guedes	WEF - King of the Streets Dec / 01 / 2007	Decision (Unanimous) N/A	3	5:00
Win	John Cholish	CF 6 - Cage Fights 6 Sep / 29 / 2007	Submission (Guillotine Choke) N/A	1	2:17
Win	James Wynn	CFC 3 - Combat Fighting Championship 3 Feb / 17 / 2007	Submission (Choke) N/A	1	4:30
Win	John LeBlanc	ISCF - Battlezone 7 Nov / 18 / 2006	Submission (Guillotine Choke) N/A	1	0:00

== Grappling career ==
- 2014 FILA Pankration Submission World Champion
- 3rd place IBJJF No Gi Jiu Jitsu World Championships Black Belt 2014
- 2014 US Grappling World Team Trials Champion
- FILA Grappling World Championship No-Gi Bronze Medalist 2013
- FILA Grappling World Championship Gi Bronze Medalist 2013
- 2nd place No-Gi Jiu-Jitsu World Championships Brown belt 2012
- 3rd place No-Gi Jiu-Jitsu World Championships Purple belt 2009
- Abu Dhabi Combat Club North American Trials Champion 2009
- Abu Dhabi Combat Club Veteran 2009
- US Grappling World Team Trials Gi Champion 2013
- US Grappling World Team Trials No-Gi Champion 2013
- 4x Naga No-Gi Expert division Champion 2005-2012
- 4x Naga Gi division Champion 2005-2012
- 2x Copa America Gi Champion
- 2x Copa America No-Gi Expert division Champion
- America's Cup Jiu Jitsu Champion 2005
- 2x NCWA Wrestling All American 2004-2005
- 2x NCWA Wrestling Conference Champion
