= Diogo Reis =

Brazilian jiu-jitsu athlete from Brazil (born 2002)

- Born: 20 March 2002 (age 24); Manaus, Brazil
- Nickname: Baby Shark
- Division: Rooster (57.5 kg /126.8 lbs); Flyweight (ONE)
- Team: Melqui Galvão Jiu-Jitsu; Melqui Galvão / Fight Sport
- Teacher: Melqui Galvão
- Rank: BJJ black belt (Note: under Melqui Galvão)

Diogo Reis is a Brazilian jiu-jitsu black belt athlete and submission grappler. He currently competes in the Flyweight division of ONE Championship, where he is the current Flyweight Submission Grappling World Champion. A competitor since childhood, Reis is a European Open, Brazilian Nationals, Pan and World Champion in the juvenile and lower belt divisions, completing an IBJJF Grand Slam in 2019. Reiss is a two-time champion at the ADCC Submission Fighting World Championship.

== Grappling career ==
Reis was born on 20 March 2002 in Manaus, Brazil. Reis started training in Brazilian jiu-jitsu in 2012 after his brother took up the sport. He joined Melqui Galvao as a yellow belt in 2015 earning all his belts from him through the coloured belt divisions then the adult ones; getting promoted to black belt on 13 December 2020, 7 months only after his brown belt grading.

=== 2022 ===
Reis competed in the first ADCC South American Trials on 5 February 2022, winning the 66 kg division and earning an invite to the 2022 ADCC World Championship.

On 25 June 2022, Reis represented Team Brazil at Polaris Squads 4. He drew two matches against Nick Ronan and Nathan Orchard while Team Brazil won the overall event. Reis was then invited to compete against Estevan Martinez at Who's Number One: Ryan v Pena 3 on 7 August 2022. Reis won the match by unanimous decision.

At the 2022 ADCC World Championship on 17–18 September, Reis defeated Ashley Williams on points in the opening round and his teammate Fabricio Andrey by decision in the quarter-final on the first day. He defeated Josh Cisneros on points in the semi-final on the second day before winning the 66 kg division by beating Gabriel Sousa on points in the final.

On 11 December 2022, Reis won a bronze medal at the IBJJF World Championship in the Light-Featherweight division.

=== 2023 ===
Reis competed in the IBJJF Curitiba International Open on 11 and 12 March 2023, winning both the gi and no gi featherweight division. On 26 March 2023, Reis won a gold medal in the light-featherweight division of the IBJJF Pan Championship 2023. He also competed in the Campeonato Brasileiro de Jiu-Jitsu on 7 May 2023, and won gold in the light-featherweight division. Reis competed in the IBJJF World Championship 2023 on 3 and 4 June 2023 and won a bronze medal in the light-featherweight division.

Reis then competed against Jack Sear in a superfight at Honor Submission Challenge Italy on 1 July 2023. He won the match by unanimous decision. Reis then faced Samuel Nagai in a superfight at BJJ Stars 11 on 9 September 2023. He won the match by decision.

Reis competed in a four-man tournament for the Who's Number One featherweight title at Who's Number One 20: Night of Champions on 1 October 2023. He won both matches by unanimous decision and was crowned the champion. Reis then won the no gi featherweight division at the IBJJF Sao Paulo Open 2023 on 19 November 2023.

Reis was booked to defend his Who's Number One featherweight title for the first time against Diego 'Pato' Oliveira at WNO 21: Ryan vs Barbosa on 30 November 2023. He was injured during the match and lost as a result, losing his featherweight title as well.

Reis was slated to represent Team Modolfo in the under 65 kg division at AIGA Champions League Final 2023 on 13 and 14 December. He had to withdraw from the tournament due to the injury suffered at WNO 21.

=== 2024 ===
Reis faced Shay Montague in a featherweight match at Who's Number One 23: Meregali vs Rocha on May 10, 2024. He won the match by submission.

Reis competed against Felipe Machado at BJJ Stars 13: Vikings Edition on August 3, 2024. He won the match on points.

Reis received an invite to compete in the under 66 kg division of the 2024 ADCC World Championship on August 17–18, 2024. He beat Huaiqing Xu, Fabricio Andrey, Josh Cisneros, and Diego ‘Pato’ Oliveira to win the division.

=== 2025 ===
Reis won a gold medal in the light-featherweight division of the IBJJF European Championship 2025. He then won a silver medal in the light-featherweight division of the IBJJF Pan Championship 2025.

Reis competed against Cleber Sousa in the main event of Majestic BJJ Challenge 5 on April 5, 2025. He won the match on points.

=== ONE Championship ===
In his ONE debut, Reis faced Shoya Ishiguro on March 8, 2025, at ONE Fight Night 29. At the weigh-ins, Reis weighed in at 139.75 pounds, 4.75 pounds over the flyweight limit and he was fined 40%, which went to Ishiguro. Reis submitted Ishiguro with a kimura to win the match.
