= Josh Hinger =

Brazilian jiu-jitsu practitioner from the USA

- Born: May 28, 1982 (age 44); Whittier, California, USA
- Height: 5 ft 10 in (1.78 m)
- Weight: 82 kg (181 lb; 12 st 13 lb)
- Division: Middleweight (Grappling); Lightweight (MMA)
- Team: Atos Jiu-Jitsu
- Rank: 3rd deg. Brazilian Jiu Jitsu black belt (under André Galvão)
- Years active: 2003–present (Grappling); 2003–2005 (MMA)

Mixed martial arts record
- Total: 5
- Wins: 4
- By submission: 4
- Losses: 1
- By decision: 1

Other information
- University: University of California, Irvine
- Notable school: Chaparral High School
- Mixed martial arts record from Sherdog

Josh Hinger (born May 28, 1982) is an American submission grappler and Brazilian jiu-jitsu (BJJ) black belt competitor as well as former mixed martial arts (MMA) fighter. Hinger is three-time champion at the World No-Gi Brazilian Jiu-Jitsu Championship and a Bronze Medalist at the ADCC Submission Wrestling World Championship.

== Background ==
Hinger was born on May 28, 1982, in Whittier, California, US and was raised in La Habra where he wrestled for Sonora High School. At age 15, he moved to Temecula and continued to wrestle for Chaparral High School where during his senior year in 2000, he was champion in a regional California Interscholastic Federation tournament in the 145 lbs division. However after winning the regional tournament, he was weight cutting for the Masters tournament and noticed he wasn't losing any further weight. Ultimately he decided to withdraw from the tournament which resulted in backlash from his coach and team and lead to him being kicked off the team permanently.

After high school, Hinger attended University of California, Irvine and in 2003 while attending school, an old wrestling teammate brought him to check out a Brazilian jiu-jitsu academy which started his journey into BJJ. Hinger would become part of Chris Brennan's fight team in Lake Forest. Brennan was Hinger's first BJJ coach and raised him from white belt to purple belt. Brennan would also act as Hinger's MMA coach.

In November 2003, Hinger made his MMA debut where he submitted Brady Fulton via rear naked choke in the first round. His MMA career lasted from 2003 to 2005 where he compiled a record on the regional circuit of four wins and one loss. Brennan's fight team came to an end in 2006 due to personal issues in the training room and disagreement among team leaders.

In 2006, after graduating from UC Irvine, Hinger joined the Peace Corps and spent two years in Turkmenistan where he participated in a few wrestling tournaments.

In 2008, Hinger came back to the US and moved to Orange County where he trained with Baret Yoshida and Jason Bukich to earn his Brown Belt.

From 2011 to 2014, Hinger attended graduate school at Indiana University Bloomington earning degrees in Central Eurasian Studies and Public Affairs with a focus in Finance. While at university, Hinger taught BJJ to attendees. During this period Hinger joined Atos Jiu-Jitsu where he trained under André Galvão. In December 2013, Hinger earned his Black Belt under Galvão.

Hinger was BJJ trainer and cornerman of UFC Woman's Strawweight Champion, Zhang Weilli in 2022 and helped her regain her belt at UFC 281 where she defeated Carla Esparza by rear naked choke.

== Professional grappling career ==
Hinger is a three-time IBJJF no gi World Champion, winning the event in 2016, 2017, and 2018. He won ADCC trials in 2019 to earn a place at the 2019 ADCC World Championships, where he won a bronze medal.

In December 2020, Hinger won a gold medal in both his weightclass and the absolute division at the IBJJF Masters World Championships.

Hinger competed in the main event of Fight 2 Win 170 on April 19, 2021, facing Rafael Barbosa for the promotion's Masters Middleweight title. Hinger won the match by decision. He then competed against Vagner Rocha at Who's Number One on May 28, 2021, and he lost the match by decision. He returned to Fight 2 Win on September 10, 2021, to face Corey Guitard at Fight 2 Win 183, winning the match by decision.

At Brazilian jiu-jitsu Stars 7 on November 6, 2021, Hinger defeated Luis Marques on points in the co-main event. Hinger was then invited to compete in the first RAW Grappling Championship grand prix on November 14, 2021. He defeated Bradley Hill in the opening round before losing to Patrick Gaudio in the semi-final.

As a result of being a previous medallist, Hinger was invited to compete at the 2022 ADCC World Championship in the 88 kg division. Hinger defeated Tye Ruotolo in the opening round before losing to eventual silver medallist Lucas 'Hulk' Barbosa.

On September 24, 2022, Hinger competed against Owen Livesey at Polaris 21. He lost by split decision. He also competed at the IBJJF Master International - North America Championship on May 31, 2023, and won gold medals in both the Master 3 medium-heavyweight and absolute divisions.

Hinger competed at the IBJJF Master World Championship on September 2, 2023, where he won both the master 3 middleweight and absolute divisions.

Hinger was invited to compete in the under 88 kg division at the 2024 ADCC World Championship. He was submitted by Chris Wojcik in the opening round.

== Personal life ==
Hinger revealed on August 11, 2023, that he had suffered a home invasion and approximately $35–40,000 worth of goods had been stolen.

== Competitive grappling summary ==
Main Achievements:

- IBJJF World No-Gi Champion (2016, 2017 and 2018)
- 3rd place ADCC World Championship (2019)
- 2nd place Eddie Bravo Invitational 3 (2015)

== Mixed martial arts record ==
Professional record breakdown
5 matches	4 wins	1 loss
By submission	4	0
By decision	0	1

Res.	Record	Opponent	Method	Event	Date	Round	Time	Location	Notes
Loss	4–1	Johnny Sampaio	Decision (Unanimous)	Extreme Wars – X-1	July 2, 2005	3	5:00	Hawaii, United States	
Win	4–0	Chris Monso	Submission (Keylock)	KOTC 49 – Soboba	May 20, 2005	1	2:58	San Jacinto, California, United States	
Win	3–0	Frank Sanchez	Submission (Rear Naked Choke)	XCF 4 – Havoc in Havasu 2	May 1, 2004	1	N/A	Arizona, United States	
Win	2–0	Tim Carey	Submission (Armbar)	OTE – Over the Edge	April 10, 2004	1	4:51	Arizona, United States	
Win	1–0	Brady Fulton	Submission (Rear Naked Choke)	XCF 3 – Xtreme Cage Fighter 3	November 22, 2003	1	2:00	Arizona, United States	

== Instructor lineage ==
Mitsuyo "Count Koma" Maeda → Carlos Gracie, Sr. → Helio Gracie → Rolls Gracie → Romero "Jacare" Cavalcanti → Alexandre Paiva → Fernando "Tererê" Augusto → André Galvao → Josh Hinger

== See also ==
- List of Brazilian Jiu-Jitsu practitioners
