= Lachlan Giles =

Australian grappler

- Born: Lachlan Sven McDonald Giles; 17 June 1986 (age 40); Melbourne, Australia
- Nickname: Velachiraptor
- Height: 5 ft 6 in (1.68 m)
- Weight: 82.3 kg (181 lb; 12 st 13 lb)
- Division: Middleweight
- Team: Absolute MMA
- Trainer: John Simon
- Rank: BJJ black belt (under John Simon)

Lachlan Sven McDonald Giles (born 17 June 1986) is an Australian grappler and Brazilian jiu-jitsu (BJJ) black belt competitor and coach. He is a bronze medalist in both the ADCC Submission Wrestling World Championship and World No-Gi Brazilian Jiu-Jitsu Championship.

== Early life and education ==
Lachlan Giles was born on 17 June 1986, in Victoria, Australia.

Growing up he was a huge fan of Jet Li's martial arts movies and trained in Kung Fu initially. One year into his training he saw a tape of UFC 1 which was won by Royce Gracie. After watching the event, he was convinced that BJJ was the best form of self defense and shortly afterwards joined a BJJ academy to focus on it.

Giles’ first BJJ instructor was Tyrone Crosse who trained Giles from white to purple belt. However Giles suffered from a severe knee injury and was forced to stop his training for a year. When he returned, the academy had a new coach, John Simon. Simon promoted Giles to brown belt and in 2012 promoted him to black belt.

Giles attended La Trobe University where he earned a Bachelor of Physiotherapy in 2008 and a PhD in Physiotherapy in 2016.

== Grappling career ==
In 2015, Giles competed at Eddie Bravo Invitational 5 where he came third place after defeating Nathan Orchard and Rani Yahya before losing to Garry Tonon by Armbar.

In 2017, Giles competed at the World IBJJF Jiu-Jitsu No-Gi Championship where he came third place after being defeated by AJ Agazarm by points in the semi-finals.

In the 2019 ADCC World Championship, Giles defeated Kaynan Duarte and Patrick Gaudio before being submitted by Gordon Ryan. Giles defeated Mahamed Aly by leglock to earn a bronze medal in the absolute category. Giles' achievement was considered notable as he was much smaller than his opponents who came mainly from the Heavyweight divisions and outweighed him by around 20 kg.

In 2020, Giles made a post on Instagram stating those who have won medals while using PEDs should relinquish those titles. Gordon Ryan made a response accusing Giles of using PEDs. After some back and forth, Giles challenged Ryan that he would bet $500,000 of his own money against just $5,000 of Ryan's that he would pass a drug test right now. Ryan did not respond to the challenge.

Giles teaches BJJ as well. He was the coach of fellow Australian grappler, Craig Jones whom he awarded a black belt in 2016. He served as the head coach for Team Australasia at the Craig Jones Invitational 2 in 2025.

== Grappling competition achievements ==
- 3rd place ADCC World Championship (2019)
- 3rd place World IBJJF Jiu-Jitsu No-Gi Championship (2019)
- 3rd place Eddie Bravo Invitational 5 (2015)
- 2nd place UAEJJF Grand Slam Abu Dhabi (2018)

== Instructor lineage ==
Carlos Gracie → Helio Gracie → Carlos Gracie Jr → Jean Jacques Machado / Rigan Machado → John Will → John Simon → Lachlan Giles
