= Fernando "Tererê" Augusto =

Brazilian BJJ practitioner

Fernando Augusto
- Born: Fernando Augusto da Silva; 15 November 1979 (age 46); Rio de Janeiro, Brazil
- Other names: Tererê
- Height: 6 ft 0 in (1.83 m)
- Weight: 181 lb (82 kg; 12.9 st)
- Division: Middleweight
- Style: Brazilian Jiu-Jitsu
- Stance: Orthodox
- Fighting out of: Rio de Janeiro, Brazil
- Team: Fernando Tererê Jiu Jitsu
- Teachers: Alexandre Paiva; Fabio Gurgel
- Rank: 3rd deg. BJJ black belt

Fernando Augusto da Silva (born 15 November 1979) is a Brazilian jiu-jitsu competitor, mixed martial arts fighter, and submission grappler. He is a black belt under professor Alexandre Paiva of Team Alliance. Tererê is a two-time World Champion in Brazilian Jiu-Jitsu (2000 and 2003) in black belt division. He has also won a number of other Brazilian jiu-jitsu competitions, including Pan-American Championship, South-American Championship, Copa do Mundo and Brazilian National Championship.

Tererê is known as one of the most influential competitors of all-time, as well as the most entertaining, because of his aggressive and highly active style.

== Early years ==
Born in the slums of Cantagalo, Rio de Janeiro, Tererê began his fighting career by training capoeira, dealing drugs, and running away from the police. His Brazilian jiu-jitsu career began at the age of 14 when professor Otavio Couto invited him to try Brazilian jiu-jitsu at his recently opened gym in Leblon, Rio de Janeiro. Professor Couto had met Tererê and his friends parking cars at McDonald's on Rua de Amoedo, Ipanema, Rio de Janeiro. At the gym, Couto and other teachers, Alexandre Paiva and Roberto Traven, were impressed by Tererê's passion and desire to learn and began to teach him the techniques and principles of jiu-jitsu.

== Competition career ==
The first big victory for him was when in 1994 he won the Brazilian Championship. In 1997 he won the World Championship (Mundials) as a blue belt. In 1998 Professor Couto awarded Tererê with a purple belt, who later that year won the open weight division in the Mundials.

A year later Fernando received a brown belt from professor Paiva and won the Mundials in his weight division (under 181 lbs), beating 2000 champion and future UFC lightweight champion B.J. Penn in the semi-final.

Some time after the competition professor Fabio Gurgel invited Tererê to São Paulo to train with him. Before leaving, Tererê received his black belt from professor Paiva.

Next year in the Mundials Tererê won his weight class, first time as a black belt. By that time he had won the title in every belt class available. He went to win the title again in 2003.

Despite being fairly light weight (weighing around 165 lbs) Tererê competed the 2004 Championships in ultra-heavy class (over 221 lbs) finishing second, only losing to Fabrício Werdum in the final by points.

== Personal life ==
'O Faixa Preta', a film about the life Tererê both on and off the mats premiered in 2022 and is available for streaming on HBO Max as of March 17, 2023.

== Championships ==
World Championship (Mundials)

- 1997 Blue Belt Champion
- 1998 Purple Belt Champion
- 1999 Brown Belt Champion
- 2000 Black Belt Champion
- 2003 Black Belt Champion

Copa do Mundo

- 2002 Black Belt Champion
- 2003 Black Belt Champion

Brazilian Nationals

- 1994 Blue Belt Champion
- 1996 Blue Belt Champion
- 1999 Brown Belt Champion
- 2001 Black Belt Champion
- 2003 Black Belt Champion

== Mixed martial arts record ==
Professional record breakdown
1 match	0 wins	1 loss
By knockout	0	0
By submission	0	0
By decision	0	1

Res.	Record	Opponent	Method	Event	Date	Round	Time	Location	Notes
Loss	0-1	(Brazil) Gleison Tibau	Decision (split)	Bitetti Combat Nordesta 2	20 March 2003	3	5:00	Natal, Rio Grande do Norte, Brazil	

== TT Team ==
Tererê and Eduardo Telles together established the TT Team in the beginning of 2003. The team was partly assembled to train and prepare future champions in the field of jiu-jitsu, but its main focus was to improve people's lives by developing a healthy lifestyle via training. Fernando and Eduardo wanted to make it possible for everyone to enjoy their life, despite their backgrounds.

TT Team met its end in 2006 due to differences between Terere and Telles.

During its short existence the TT Team produced notable fighters like Rubens 'Cobrinha' Charles and André Galvao.

== Instructor Lineage ==
Mitsuyo "Count Koma" Maeda → Carlos Gracie, Sr. → Helio Gracie → Rolls Gracie → Romero "Jacare" Cavalcanti → Alexandre Paiva → Fernando "Tererê" Augusto
