= Alexandre Ribeiro =

Brazilian Brazilian Jiu-Jitsu practitioner and mixed martial arts fighter

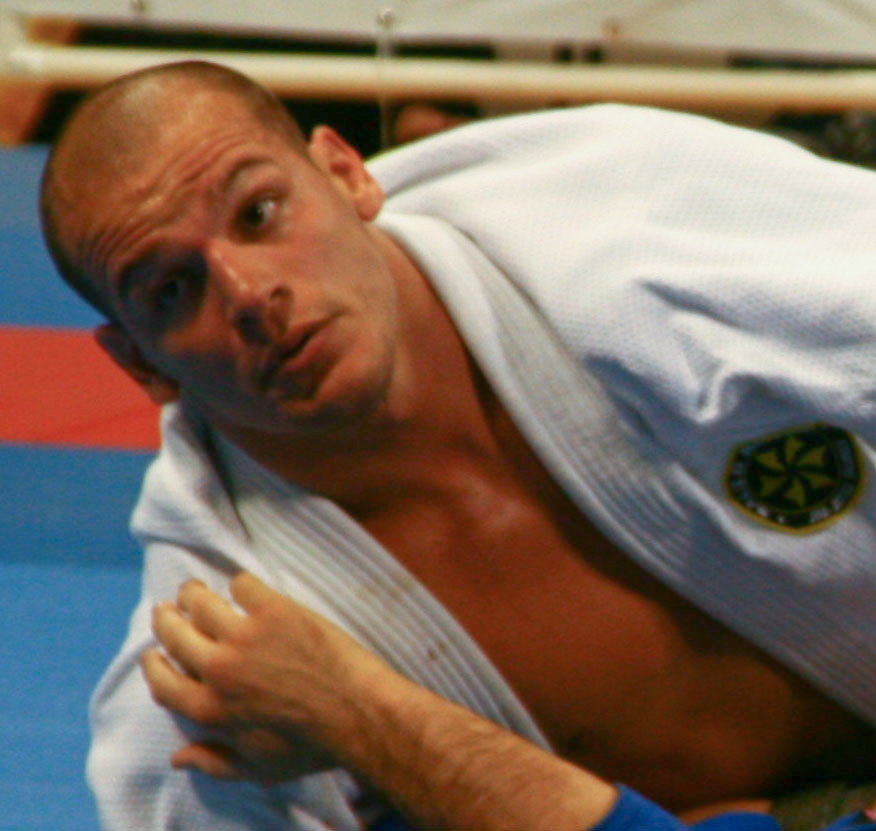
- Born: January 20, 1981 (age 45); Manaus, Brazil
- Other names: Xande
- Height: 1.82 m (6 ft 0 in)
- Weight: 204.1 lb (92.6 kg; 14.58 st)
- Division: 205
- Fighting out of: Austin, Texas, U.S.
- Team: Six Blades Jiu-Jitsu; Ribeiro Jiu-Jitsu
- Rank: 6th deg. BJJ black belt; Judo black belt
- Years active: 1997–2022

Mixed martial arts record
- Total: 2
- Wins: 2
- By knockout: 2
- Losses: 0

Other information
- Website: https://sixbladesjiujitsu.com/
- Mixed martial arts record from Sherdog

Alexandre "Xande" Ribeiro (born January 20, 1981) is a Brazilian Jiu-Jitsu practitioner, mixed martial artist and submission wrestler. He is a two-time World Black Belt Absolute (open weight) World Jiu-Jitsu Champion, five-time World Black Belt Heavy Weight Champion, and three-time World Black Belt Pro Division Champion.

== Biography ==
Alexandre Ribeiro was born in Manaus, Amazonas Brazil. He began training Jiu-Jitsu at the Associacao Monteiro de Jiu-Jitsu under the supervision of Binho, Guto, Yano e Lucinho Monteiro. He moved to the US in 2002 and lived in Toledo, Ohio, for five years, after which in 2007 he moved to San Diego, California, where he founded the University of Jiu-Jitsu and was the brand ambassador of Ribeiro Jiu-Jitsu.

Ribeiro lives in Austin, TX, where he teaches at his School Six Blades Jiu-Jitsu Austin and coordinate his team and affiliation schools under the Six Blades Jiu-Jitsu Team.

After a long time away from competition, Ribeiro decided to make a return in 2020 and competed in several superfights. This culminated in an attempt to After competing at the IBJJF World Championships in 2022, he announced his intention to retire permanently from IBJJF competition. After one final competition at the 2022 ADCC world championships, Ribeiro announced that he would also be retiring from competition. After spending over two years in retirement, Ribeiro announced that he would return to competition at the IBJJF European Championship 2025.

Ribeiro's brother Saulo Ribeiro is also a Jiu-jitsu and submission wrestling champion. They have both won multiple ADCC and together, they hold the most titles in World Brazilian jiu-jitsu Championships. In December 2023, it was announced that Ribeiro would be the first member of the 2024 class of the ADCC Hall of Fame.

=== Return ===
Ribeiro then faced Richie Martinez at Who’s Number One 27 on April 18, 2025. He won the match by submission.

Ribeiro then faced Kit Dale in the co-main event of Who’s Number One 28 on June 13, 2025. He lost the match by decision.

== Six Blades Jiu-Jitsu ==
in 2020, Ribeiro announced leaving Ribeiro Jiu-Jitsu which he co-founded with his brother, starting his own jiu-jitsu academy and team based in Austin, Texas called “Six Blades Jiu-Jitsu", with a number of schools across the US and Brazil joining as affiliates. In 2023, Six Blades Jiu-Jitsu was ranked No.8 for male athletes at the 2023 World Jiu-Jitsu Championship.

== Mixed martial arts record ==
Professional record breakdown
2 matches	2 wins	0 losses
By knockout	2	0

Res.	Record	Opponent	Method	Event	Date	Round	Time	Location	Notes
Win	2–0	Keiichiro Yamamiya	KO (punch)	World Victory Road Presents: Sengoku 8	May 2, 2009	3	0:51	Tokyo, Japan	
Win	1–0	Takashi Sugiura	TKO (knees and punches)	World Victory Road Presents: Sengoku 5	September 28, 2008	3	4:18	Tokyo, Japan	

== See also ==
- List of Brazilian Jiu-Jitsu practitioners
