= Juliana Borges =

Brazilian jiu-jitsu practitioner from Brazil

- Born: Juliana Vieira Borges; 31 July 1977 (age 49); Goiânia, Brazil
- Division: Middleweight (BJJ) -69 kg (152.1 lb)
- Style: Brazilian jiu-jitsu; Freestyle Wrestling; Judo
- Team: Nova União; Fernando Boi; American Top Team
- Rank: BJJ black belt (Note: under Fernando Boi); Judo black belt (Note: under Sebastião Borges)

Juliana Vieira Borges is a Brazilian former freestyle wrestler, submission grappler, Judoka and Brazilian jiu-jitsu (BJJ) black belt practitioner.

A champion in wrestling, judo and BJJ (gi and no-gi), competing in all three disciplines for over a decade; Borges became in 2005 the first woman to win double gold at the ADCC Submission Fighting World Championship, the first woman to win the ADCC openweight category and the first Brazilian woman to win the freestyle wrestling Pan American Championship.

== Biography ==
Juliana Vieira Borges was born on 31 July 1977, in Goiânia, Brazil. A competitive swimmer from a young age she also started Judo at age 12 under the guidance of her uncle Sebastião Borges and her father, a Judo black-belt.

Between 1995 and 1997, Borges earned multiple state titles and the Brazilian Nationals with the Brazilian National League of Judo. In 1997 she was promoted to Judo black belt. Two years later she won 3 gold medals in the Brazilian National Swimming League. While at University studying odontology she was introduced to Brazilian jiu-jitsu (BJJ) by a fellow judoka as a way to improve her judo groundwork (ne-waza), on her return home she continued training BJJ under Fernando Boi.

She received all her belts from Boi starting with blue, she became world champion in 2000, then a second time the following year in 2001 while at purple belt, competing in the purple/brown and black division after defeating Renata Pimentel in the final.

Under Boi's training, Borges started freestyle wrestling, in 2002 she joined a workgroup led by Alejo Morales. In 2003 she became the first Brazilian woman to win the freestyle wrestling Pan American Championship. A year later she won bronze at the 2004 IBJJF World Championship in the middleweight division. (Note: purple/brown and black division) She was promoted to black belt by Boi in 2004.

In 2005 she joined ATT (American Top Team) moving to the U.S. to train under Ricardo Liborio as well as Jason Kelly a wrestling coach. Borges was invited to compete at ADCC Submission Fighting World Championship in the very first female division in May 2005; after defeating Hannette Staack, Megumi Yabushita and Stacy Cartwright she won the +60 kg division, she then defeated Kizma Button, Alessandra Vieira and Tara LaTosa to win the first Women Absolute (openweight). Two weeks after ADCC she competed in a mixed gender (Note: female (no-gi and gi) and male (no-gi)) NAGA (Expert division) championship, winning gold. In 2009 she won bronze at the IBJJF World Championship after losing to Kyra Gracie in the semi-final.

== Competitive summary ==
=== Submission Grappling and Brazilian Jiu-Jitsu ===
Main Achievements (black belt level):

- CBJJO World Cup Champion (2004)
- ADCC World Champion (2005 (Note: Weight and absolute))
- NAGA Expert Division Champion (2005)
- 3rd place IBJJF World Championship (2009)

Main Achievements (colored belt level):

- IBJJF World Champion (2000 blue, 2001 purple)
- IBJJF Pan Champion (2000 blue)
- 3rd place IBJJF World Championship (2004 brown)

=== Freestyle Wrestling ===
Main Achievements:

- Pan American Champion (2004 / 2005)
- Brazilian Nationals Champion (2003 / 2004 / 2005)
- 2nd place Pan American Championships (2006)

=== Judo ===
Main Achievements:

- Brazil National Judo League Champion (1997)
- Goiás State Champion (1996 / 1997)
- Minas Gerais State Champion (1995 / 1997)

== Instructor lineage ==
Carlos Gracie > Carlson Gracie > Andre Pederneiras > Fernando Marques (Boi) > Juliana Borges
