= Alexandre Freitas (grappler) =

Brazilian Jiu-Jitsu practitioner

Alexandre Carneiro Monteiro de Freitas
- Born: September 6, 1972 (age 54); Rio de Janeiro, Brazil
- Other names: Soca
- Nationality: Brazilian; American
- Height: 5 ft 8 in (173 cm)
- Weight: 155 lb (70 kg; 11 st 1 lb)
- Division: Featherweight
- Style: Brazilian Jiu-Jitsu
- Team: Soca BJJ / R1ng BJJ
- Rank: 7th degree coral belt in Brazilian Jiu Jitsu

Other information
- Website: https://www.socabjj.com/

Alexandre Carneiro Monteiro de Freitas (born 9 September 1972) commonly known as Alexandre "Soca" Freitas is a Brazilian grappler, Brazilian Jiu-Jitsu competitor and instructor. He is the founder of Soca BJJ.

== Brazilian Jiu Jitsu ==
Freitas began training at fifteen years old. At first, Soca spent many of his early years surfing. His brother, Flavio Freitas, who was a blue belt at the time, trained at Carlos Gracie Jr Academy. It was then Soca decided to give Jiu-Jitsu a try. It was at Carlos Gracie Jr. Academy that Soca would begin learning under Jean Jacques Machado. Machado showed Soca the most effective techniques which helped establish the foundation for Soca’s legendary Jiu-Jitsu skill. Soca was awarded his black belt in 1994 by Carlos Gracie Jr.

Since then, Soca has won many prestigious titles. He is an eight-time World Master Champion, 2016 and 2017 Abu Dhabi World Pro Legends Light Weight Champion and was elected the best match of the event, ADCC World Champion and elected the most technical competitor of the event, five-time PAN American Champion, Pan American No-gi Champion, and Brazilian National Champion. He still holds the number one spot in the IBJJF world ranking in his division and has for many years.

During his time in Brasil, Soca trained and learned from many world champions such as Renzo Gracie, Ralph Gracie, Roger Gracie, Roberto “Gordo” Correa, Helio “Soneca” Moreira, Vinicius “Draculino” Magalhães, Ryan Gracie, Daniel Gracie, João “Big Head” Paulo, Romel Cardoso, Mauricio “Tinguinha”, Antonio “Nino” Schembri, Roberto “Roleta”, Nelson Monteiro, Rafael “Gordinho” Correa, Regis Calixto, Eduardo “Duda” Galvão, Marcio “Pe de Pano” Cruz, and many others.

Soca has not stopped competing since the age of fifteen. His wife, Samantha, and three children all compete in IBJJF events. Samantha is a seven-time World Master Champion. His children are following in his footsteps holding their own titles as Kids Pan American Champions, International Kids Champions, and Long Island Pride Champions.

Soca began his journey teaching jiu-jitsu in 1993. Soca Brazilian Jiu-Jitsu Academy opened in 2005. Since then, he has dedicated his experience and hard work to his school. There are currently three Academies opened under his name located in Wantagh NY, Glen Cove NY, and San Diego CA. He has developed a BJJ program to cater to any type of student both competitors and non-competitors. The academy has many titles including IBJJF Team Champion and Long Island Pride Tournament Kids and Adults Champion. Professor Soca has ninety-two black belt students under his name. He attributes much of the academy’s success to his wife Samantha.

Soca has also teamed up with his oldest friends and teammates Roberto “Gordo”, Mauricio “Tinguinha”, Marcio “pe de Pano”, and Regis Calixto to create a non profit organization R1NG BJJ Team. The team consists of multiple schools here in America and Brazil. The goal of R1NG is to bring a bigger team to compete at the world-level jiu-jitsu championships.

He is an 8-time IBJJF World Master Champion having won in 2013,2014,2015, 2016 No Gi Champion, 2018. 2019, 2020,2021

On July 28, 2018 he announced via his Twitter account to have received his 6th degree blackbelt from Jean Jacques Machado.

On August 9, 2025 he received his 7th degree coral belt from Jean Jacques Machado and Renzo Gracie.

== Instructor lineage ==
Mitsuyo "Count Koma" Maeda → Carlos Gracie, Sr. → Helio Gracie → Carlos Gracie Jr. → Alexandre Freitas

== Personal life ==
When he was 18 years old, he started training boxing so Renzo Gracie and Carlos Gracie Jr. started calling him "Socador" or "Soca" which means a puncher or striker. Eventually everybody at the Gracie Barra Academy started calling him "Soca".

== Mixed martial arts record ==
Professional record breakdown
1 match	0 wins	1 loss
By knockout	0	1

Res.	Record	Opponent	Method	Event	Date	Round	Time	Location	Notes
Loss	0–1	Yoshiro Maeda	TKO (flying knee and punches)	Pancrase: Brave 2	February 15, 2004	2	0:25	Osaka, Japan	

== See also ==
- List of Brazilian Jiu-Jitsu practitioners
