= Saulo Ribeiro =

Brazilian martial artist

- Born: Saulo Mendonça Ribeiro Filho; Manaus, Brazil
- Nationality: American and Brazilian
- Height: 5 ft 9 in (1.75 m)
- Weight: 190 lb (86 kg; 13 st 8 lb)
- Division: Medio 181.5 lbs, 82.3 Kg, Medio-Pesado 195 lbs, 88 Kg, and Pesado 208 lbs, 94.5 Kg
- Style: Brazilian jiu-jitsu, submission wrestling
- Fighting out of: San Diego, CA
- Team: Gracie Humaita / Ribeiro Jiu Jitsu
- Rank: 6th deg. BJJ black belt Judo black belt

Other information
- Mixed martial arts record from Sherdog

Saulo Mendonça Ribeiro Filho (born July 2, 1974) is a Brazilian submission grappler and former mixed martial artist. He is a 6th-degree black belt in Brazilian jiu-jitsu (BJJ) and brother of Xande Ribeiro. After earning a black belt in judo, he began his training of Brazilian jiu-jitsu in Rio de Janeiro under Royler Gracie, the son of Hélio Gracie, at Gracie Humaitá.

Ribeiro received his black belt in BJJ on November 27, 1995. Less than two years later, he won his first MMA fight. He also won the World Jiu-Jitsu Championship five times, in several weight classes.

== Biography ==
Saulo Ribeiro was born in Manaus, Brazil on July 2, 1974. At the age of 15 and already a judo practitioner, Ribeiro started training jiu-jitsu as a way to improve his judo game by learning submissions. He moved away from home in December 1991 and headed to school in Rio de Janeiro. Rio de Janeiro is where Ribeiro began his training under Royler Gracie at Gracie Humaitá. Shortly after receiving his black belt from Royler Gracie on November 27, 1995, Ribeiro won the Brazilian Nationals Lightweight Title.

=== Teaching ===
Alongside his brother Xande, Ribeiro ran the University of Jiu Jitsu (closed as of 2020) in San Diego, California. The school opened in Feb 10, 2007, and was the headquarters of the Ribeiro Jiu-Jitsu Association. Ribeiro is also the author of the book Jiu Jitsu University, a detailed training manual that presents techniques for each belt level from white to black belt.

Ribeiro, through the Ribeiro Jiu-Jitsu Association, is said to have over 2000 students. Ribeiro has also been coach to high-level grappling competitors such as World Jiu-Jitsu Champion Rafael Lovato Jr., and MMA fighter Diego Sanchez.

=== Retirement and return ===
The 2009 ADCC in Barcelona would be Ribeiro's last, and saw him, to the surprise of many, competing in the +99 kg weight category. He defeated Kouji Kanechika and World Jiu-Jitsu Champion Romulo Barral before losing to the much larger Fabrício Werdum in the semifinal on judges' decision. After losing on another judges' decision in the third-place dispute to Jeff Monson, Ribeiro announced his retirement from professional jiu-jitsu and grappling competition.

Less than a year later, Ribeiro announced he would be competing for the first time in the International Masters and Seniors tournament. He succeeded in winning his weight division, along with the team trophy for Gracie Humaita, who had lost it to Gracie Barra the previous year.

On August 9, 2014, Ribeiro fought Rodrigo Medeiros in a grappling match in Metamoris IV. The fight ended in a draw.

On January 31, 2022, Ribeiro was inducted as part of the inaugural class of the ADCC Hall of Fame for his achievements in the sport.

== Mixed martial arts record ==
Professional record breakdown
| 3 matches | 2 wins | 1 loss |
| By knockout | 0 | 1 |
| By submission | 2 | 0 |

| Res. | Record | Opponent | Method | Event | Date | Round | Time | Location | Notes |
|---|---|---|---|---|---|---|---|---|---|
| Win | 2–1 | Jason Ireland | Submission (Rear Naked Choke) | TFC 5 - Fightzone 5 | September 21, 2002 | - | - | Toledo, Ohio | |
| Loss | 1–1 | Yuki Kondo | TKO (Punches) | C2K - Colosseum 2000 | May 26, 2000 | 1 | 0:22 | Japan | |
| Win | 1–0 | Carlos Lopes | Submission (Rear Naked Choke) | CDL - Carioca de Freestyle | February 10, 1996 | - | - | Brazil | |

== Instructor lineage ==
Kanō Jigorō → Tomita Tsunejirō → Mitsuyo "Count Koma" Maeda → Carlos Gracie → Helio Gracie → Royler Gracie → Saulo Ribeiro

== See also ==
- List of Brazilian jiu-jitsu practitioners
