= Rubens Charles Maciel =

Brazilian martial artist

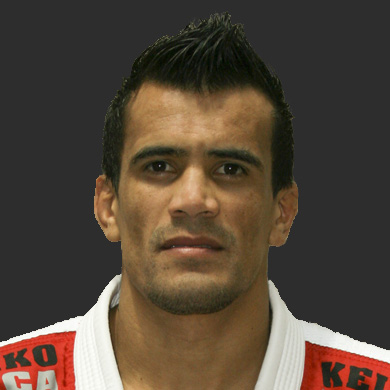
- Born: December 24, 1979 (age 46); Londrina, Parana, Brazil
- Other names: Cobrinha
- Height: 5 ft 4 in (1.63 m)
- Weight: 154 lb (70 kg; 11.0 st)
- Team: Alliance Jiu Jitsu
- Rank: black belt in Brazilian Jiu-Jitsu

Rubens Charles Maciel
Medal record

Representing Brazil

Grappling

ADCC Submission Wrestling World Championship
Silver medal – second place	2009 Barcelona, Spain	-66kg
Silver medal – second place	2011 Nottingham, UK	-66kg
Gold medal – first place	2013 Beijing, China	-66kg
Gold medal – first place	2015 Sao Paulo, Brazil	-66kg
Gold medal – first place	2017 Espoo, Finland	-66kg

Brazilian Jiu-Jitsu

World Jiu-Jitsu Championship
Gold medal – first place	2006 Rio de Janeiro, Brazil	-70 kg
Gold medal – first place	2007 California, USA	-70 kg
Gold medal – first place	2008 California, USA	-70 kg
Gold medal – first place	2009 California, USA	-70 kg
Silver medal – second place	2010 California, USA	-70 kg
Bronze medal – third place	2011 California, USA	-70 kg
Silver medal – second place	2012 California, USA	-70 kg
Bronze medal – third place	2013 California, USA	-70 kg
Silver medal – second place	2014 California, USA	-70 kg
Silver medal – second place	2015 California, USA	-70 kg
Bronze medal – third place	2016 California, USA	-70 kg
Gold medal – first place	2017 California, USA	-70 kg

Nogi World Championship
Gold medal – first place	2007 California, USA	-67.5 kg
Gold medal – first place	2008 California, USA	-73.5 kg
Gold medal – first place	2011 California, USA	-67.5 kg
Gold medal – first place	2012 California, USA	-67.5 kg

Pan American Jiu-Jitsu Championship
Gold medal – first place	2007 California, USA	-70 kg
Gold medal – first place	2008 California, USA	-70 kg
Gold medal – first place	2009 California, USA	-70 kg
Bronze medal – third place	2009 California, USA	Absolute
Gold medal – first place	2010 California, USA	-70 kg
Silver medal – second place	2012 California, USA	-70 kg
Silver medal – second place	2013 California, USA	-70 kg
Gold medal – first place	2017 California, USA	-70 kg

Pan American No-Gi Jiu-Jitsu Championship
Gold medal – first place	2008 California, USA	-76 kg

Brazilian National Jiu-Jitsu Championship
Gold medal – first place	2017 Sao Paulo, Brazil	-76 kg

European Jiu-Jitsu Championship
Gold medal – first place	2013 Lisbon, Portugal	-70 kg
Gold medal – first place	2017 Lisbon, Portugal	-70 kg

World Professional Jiu-Jitsu Cup
Silver medal – second place	2009 Abu Dhabi, UAE	-65 kg
Bronze medal – third place	2011 Abu Dhabi, UAE	-74 kg
Silver medal – second place	2011 Abu Dhabi, UAE	Absolute

Rubens Charles Maciel (born December 24, 1979), a.k.a. "Cobrinha" and sometimes referred to as Rubens "Cobrinha" Charles, is a Brazilian Jiu Jitsu (BJJ) competitor. He is considered the best featherweight in the decade and to be among the best pound for pound jiu jitsu competitors in the world. Cobrinha is a black belt in Brazilian jiu-jitsu under Fernando "Terere" Augusto and a member of Alliance Jiu Jitsu. Cobrinha has won a total of six world championship titles in Brazilian jiu-jitsu as a black belt in the featherweight (or lightweight) category. He started training BJJ in 2000, received his black belt in 2005, and has since medaled in every World Jiu-Jitsu Championship in which he has competed - a total of ten. He is known for his attacking style of jiu jitsu and, in particular, for his guard. His guard was voted the best Guard of the Decade by fellow World Champions.

Before opening his own school Cobrinha BJJ in Los Angeles, California, in 2011, he was an instructor at the Alliance Jiu Jitsu headquarters in Atlanta, Georgia. One of his notable students is Fabricio Werdum. On January 24, 2022, Cobrinha was announced as the tenth member of the inaugural class of the ADCC Hall of Fame.

== Championship record ==
=== IBJJF World Championships ===
- 1st place - Black Belt -70kg 2017
- 3rd Place - Black Belt -70kg 2016
- 2nd Place - Black Belt -70kg 2015
- 2nd Place - Black Belt -70kg 2014
- 3rd Place - Black Belt -70kg 2013
- 2nd Place - Black Belt -70kg 2012
- 3rd Place - Black Belt -70kg 2011
- 2nd Place - Black Belt -70kg 2010
- 1st Place - Black Belt -70kg 2009
- 1st Place - Black Belt -70kg 2008
- 1st Place - Black Belt -70kg 2007
- 1st Place - Black Belt -70kg 2006

=== IBJJF World No-Gi Championships ===
- 1st Place - Black Belt -67,5kg 2012
- 1st Place - Black Belt -73,5kg 2011
- 1st Place - Black Belt -67,5kg 2008
- 1st Place - Black Belt -67,5kg 2007

=== IBJJF Pan American Championships ===
- 1st Place - Black Belt -70kg 2017
- 2nd Place - Black Belt -70kg 2013
- 2nd Place - Black Belt -70kg 2012
- 1st Place - Black Belt -70kg 2010
- 1st Place - Black Belt -70kg 2009
- 3rd Place - Black Belt -70kg 2009 - Absolute
- 1st Place - Black Belt -70kg 2008
- 1st Place - Black Belt -70kg 2007

=== IBJJF Pan American No-Gi Championships ===
- 1st Place - Black Belt -70kg 2008

=== IBJJF European Championships ===
- 1st Place - Black Belt -70kg 2017
- 1st Place - Black Belt -70kg 2013

=== IBJJF Brazilian National Championships ===
- 1st Place - Black Belt -70kg 2017

=== ADCC 2017 Abu Dhabi Combat Club : Finland ===
- -66 kg: 1st place

=== ADCC 2015 Abu Dhabi Combat Club : Sao Paulo ===
- -66 kg: 1st place

=== ADCC 2013 Abu Dhabi Combat Club : Beijing ===
- -66 kg: 1st place

=== ADCC 2011 Abu Dhabi Combat Club : Nottingham ===
- -66 kg: 2nd place

=== ADCC 2009 Abu Dhabi Combat Club : Barcelona ===
- -66 kg: 2nd place

=== World Professional Jiu-Jitsu Cup ===
- 2nd Place - Black Belt -70kg 2011 - Absolute
- 3rd Place - Black Belt -74kg 2011
- 2nd Place - Black Belt -65kg 2009

== Instructor lineage ==
Mitsuyo Maeda > Carlos Gracie > Helio Gracie > Rolls Gracie > Romero Cavalcanti > Alexandre Paiva > Fernando Augusto Terere > Rubens Charles

== See also ==
- Bernardo Faria
- Bruno Malfacine
- Herbert Burns
