= UFC BJJ 14 =

2026 combat sport event in Nevada, US

UFC BJJ 14: Tackett vs. Wojcik
- Promotion: UFC Brazilian Jiu-Jitsu
- Date: December 3, 2026
- Venue: Meta Apex
- City: Enterprise, Nevada, United States

Event chronology
UFC BJJ 13: Tackett vs. Rodriguez	UFC BJJ 14: Tackett vs. Wojcik	UFC BJJ 15

UFC BJJ 14: Tackett vs. Wojcik is an upcoming submission grappling event produced by UFC Brazilian Jiu-Jitsu (UFC BJJ) on December 3, 2026, at the Meta APEX in Las Vegas, Nevada, United States. It will be broadcast live around the world on UFC Fight Pass.

== Background ==
A UFC BJJ Welterweight Championship bout between reigning champion Andrew Tackett and Chris Wojcik is scheduled to headline the event.

A UFC BJJ Women's Featherweight Championship bout between reigning champion Brianna Ste-Marie (who is also 2022 World No-Gi champion) and former champion Aurelie Le Vern is scheduled to co-headline the event. They were previously scheduled for UFC BJJ 7 in April, but Ste-Marie had to withdraw.

== Fight card ==
Main card (UFC Fight Pass)
Weight class				Method	Round	Time	Notes
Welterweight	Andrew Tackett (c)	vs.	Chris Wojcik				(Note: For the UFC BJJ Welterweight Championship)
Women’s Featherweight	Brianna Ste-Marie (c)	vs.	Aurelie Le Vern				(Note: For the UFC BJJ Women’s Featherweight Championship.)
Lightweight	Kennedy Maciel	vs.	Keith Krikorian
Heavyweight	Dan Manasoiu	vs.	Nick Hartman
Light Heavyweight	Lucas Barbosa	vs.	Elder Cruz
Women’s Flyweight	Sabrina Gondim	vs.	Amanda Bruse

== See also ==
- UFC BJJ
