= UFC BJJ =

American submission grappling promotion company

UFC Brazilian Jiu-Jitsu
- Type: Private
- Industry: Submission grappling promotion
- Founded: 2025
- Founder: Dana White
- Headquarters: Las Vegas, Nevada, U.S.
- Area served: United States; Worldwide
- Key people: Ari Emanuel (CEO & Executive Chairman, TKO); Dana White (CEO & President, UFC); Cláudia Gadelha (Senior Director of Jiu-Jitsu Strategy & Business Development, UFC BJJ)
- Owner: Ultimate Fighting Championship
- Parent: TKO Group Holdings

UFC BJJ: Road to the Title
- Genre: Combat sport Reality
- Country of origin: United States
- Original language: English
- No. of seasons: 1
- No. of episodes: 8

Production
- Executive producer: Dana White
- Running time: 19–38 minutes
- Production companies: Ultimate Fighting Productions, LLC

Original release
- Network: YouTube
- Release: June 16, 2025

UFC Brazilian Jiu-Jitsu (UFC BJJ) is an American submission grappling promotion company owned by the Ultimate Fighting Championship (UFC) mixed martial arts promotion, itself a subsidiary of TKO Group Holdings (TKO).

UFC BJJ first gained notoriety with the launch of UFC BJJ: Road to the Title, an eight-episode Brazilian jiu-jitsu-reality show hybrid series which aired for free on UFC Fight Pass and the UFC YouTube channel. It featured two teams of top lightweight and welterweight competitors, coached by Mikey Musumeci and Rerisson Gabriel. The athletes competed in a tournament to determine the finalists in each division, who will face off alongside the coaches at UFC BJJ 1 to crown the inaugural champions.

At UFC BJJ 1, Mikey Musumeci, Carlos Henrique, and Andrew Tackett captured the inaugural bantamweight, lightweight, and welterweight championships.

== Rules ==
Each bout shall be contested over three rounds, each lasting five minutes. The referee serves as the sole authority within the bout, with full discretion to enforce the rules. This includes issuing cautions, warnings, negative points, positional resets, disqualifications, and initiating or halting the action as necessary.

If no submission occurs by the conclusion of the third round, the outcome shall be determined by the judges using the 10-point must system. Judging criteria are prioritized in the following order, from highest to lowest value:

- #1: Initiation of Bout-Ending Techniques
- #2: Initiation of Action
- #3: Duration of Control

The bouts take place inside "The Bowl", a bowl-shaped area of play designed to encourage action. The walls of the bowl limit either combatant’s ability to shy away from engaging, similar to the idea behind "The Octagon".

== List of events ==
#	Event	Date	Venue	Location	Ref.
14	UFC BJJ 14: Tackett vs. Wojcik	December 3, 2026	Meta Apex	Las Vegas, Nevada, United States	
13	UFC BJJ 13: Tackett vs. Rodriguez	October 29, 2026	Meta Apex	Las Vegas, Nevada, United States	
12	UFC BJJ 12: Moura vs. Fornarino	October 8, 2026	Meta Apex	Las Vegas, Nevada, United States	
11	UFC BJJ 11: Musumeci vs. Mitchell	September 24, 2026	Meta Apex	Las Vegas, Nevada, United States	
10	UFC BJJ 10: Tackett vs. Gracie	August 20, 2026	Meta Apex	Las Vegas, Nevada, United States	
9	UFC BJJ 9: Fowler vs. Johnson	June 4, 2026	Meta Apex	Las Vegas, Nevada, United States	
8	UFC BJJ 8: Musumeci vs. Dantzler	May 21, 2026	Meta Apex	Las Vegas, Nevada, United States	
7	UFC BJJ 7: Tackett vs. Rocha	April 2, 2026	Meta Apex	Las Vegas, Nevada, United States	
6	UFC BJJ 6: Fowler vs. Machado	March 12, 2026	Meta Apex	Las Vegas, Nevada, United States	
5	UFC BJJ 5: Musumeci vs. Montague	February 12, 2026	Meta Apex	Las Vegas, Nevada, United States	
4	UFC BJJ 4: Tackett vs. Dorsey	December 11, 2025	UFC Apex	Las Vegas, Nevada, United States	
3	UFC BJJ 3: Musumeci vs. Carrasco	October 2, 2025	UFC Apex	Las Vegas, Nevada, United States	
2	UFC BJJ 2: Tackett vs. Canuto	July 31, 2025	UFC Apex	Las Vegas, Nevada, United States	
1	UFC BJJ 1: Musumeci vs. Gabriel	June 25, 2025	UFC Apex	Las Vegas, Nevada, United States	

== Current champions ==
=== Men ===
Division	Champion	Since	Defenses	Ref.
Light Heavyweight	(United States) Mason Fowler	July 31, 2025	3	
Middleweight	(United States) William Tackett	Oct 29, 2026	0	
Welterweight	(United States) Andrew Tackett	Jun 25, 2025	4	
Lightweight	(Brazil) Renato Canuto	Oct 8, 2026	0	
Bantamweight	(Philippines) Jalen Fonacier	Oct 29, 2026	0	

=== Women ===
Division	Champion	Since	Defenses	Ref.
Featherweight	(Canada) Brianna Ste-Marie	Aug 20, 2026	0	
Bantamweight	(Brazil) Cassia Moura	Mar 12, 2026	1	
Flyweight	(Brazil) Cassia Moura	Oct 8, 2026	0	

== Men's championship history ==
=== Light Heavyweight ===
186 to 205 pounds

No.	Name	Event	Date	Reign	Defenses	Ref.
1	(United States) Mason Fowler def. David Garmo	UFC BJJ 2: Tackett vs. Canuto; Las Vegas, NV, US	Jul 31, 2025	476 days (incumbent)	1. def. Pedro Machado at UFC BJJ 6 on March 12, 2026; 2. def. Devhonte Johnson at UFC BJJ 9 on June 4, 2026; 3. drew with Nick Rodriguez at UFC BJJ 11 on September 24, 2026	

=== Middleweight ===
171 to 185 pounds

No.	Name	Event	Date	Reign	Defenses	Ref.
1	(Brazil) Ronaldo Júnior def. William Tackett	UFC BJJ 4: Tackett vs. Dorsey; Las Vegas, NV, US	Dec 11, 2025	322 days	1. def. Tarik Hopstock at UFC BJJ 5 on February 12, 2026	
Júnior vacated the title due to a injury which will need surgery. The title was officially vacated on October 29th, 2026.
2	(United States) William Tackett def. Jay Rodriguez	UFC BJJ 13: Tackett vs Rodriguez; Las Vegas, NV, US	Oct 29, 2026	21 days (incumbent)		

=== Welterweight ===
156 to 170 pounds

No.	Name	Event	Date	Reign	Defenses	Ref.
1	(United States) Andrew Tackett def. Andy Varela	UFC BJJ 1: Musumeci vs. Gabriel; Las Vegas, NV, US	Jun 25, 2025	512 days (incumbent)	1. def. Renato Canuto at UFC BJJ 2 on July 31, 2025; 2. def. Elijah Dorsey at UFC BJJ 4 on December 11, 2025; 3. def. Vagner Rocha at UFC BJJ 7 on April 2, 2026; 4. def. Jonnatas Gracie at UFC BJJ 10 on August 20, 2026	

=== Lightweight ===
146 to 155 pounds

No.	Name	Event	Date	Reign	Defenses	Ref.
1	(Brazil) Carlos Henrique def. Danilo Moreira	UFC BJJ 1: Musumeci vs. Gabriel; Las Vegas, NV, US	Jun 25, 2025	281 days	1. def. Matheus Gabriel at UFC BJJ 3 on October 2, 2025	
2	(Brazil) Lucas Valente	UFC BJJ 7: Tackett vs. Rocha; Las Vegas, NV, US	Apr 2, 2026	190 days		
On July 10th, 2026 Valente announced he was vacating to pursue MMA. The title was officially vacated on October 8th, 2026.
3	(Brazil) Renato Canuto def. Ethan Crelinsten	UFC BJJ 12: Moura vs. Fornarino; Las Vegas, NV, US	Oct 8, 2026	42 days (incumbent)		

=== Bantamweight ===
126 to 135 pounds

No.	Name	Event	Date	Reign	Defenses	Ref.
1	(United States) Mikey Musumeci def. Rerisson Gabriel	UFC BJJ 1: Musumeci vs. Gabriel; Las Vegas, NV, US	Jun 25, 2025	491 days	1. def. Keven Carrasco at UFC BJJ 3 on October 2, 2025; 2. def. Shay Montague at UFC BJJ 5 on February 12, 2026; 3. def. Kevin Dantzler at UFC BJJ 8 on May 21, 2026	
On October 8th, 2026 Musumeci announced he was vacating to pursue MMA. The title was officially vacated on October 29th, 2026.
2	(Philippines) Jalen Fonacier def. Kleber Barbosa	UFC BJJ 13: Tackett vs Rodriguez; Las Vegas, NV, US	Oct 29, 2026	21 days (incumbent)		

== Women's championship history ==
=== Women's Featherweight ===
136 to 145 pounds

No.	Name	Event	Date	Reign	Defenses	Ref.
1	(France) Aurélie Le Vern def. Raquel Canuto	UFC BJJ 4: Tackett vs. Dorsey; Las Vegas, NV, US	Dec 11, 2025	112 days		
2	(Brazil) Rebeca Lima	UFC BJJ 7: Tackett vs. Rocha; Las Vegas, NV, US	Apr 2, 2026	141 days		
3	(Canada) Brianna Ste-Marie	UFC BJJ 10: Tackett vs. Gracie; Las Vegas, NV, US	Aug 20, 2026	91 days (incumbent)		

=== Women's Bantamweight ===
126 to 135 pounds

No.	Name	Event	Date	Reign	Defenses	Ref.
1	(Brazil) Cassia Moura def. Ffion Davies	UFC BJJ 6: Fowler vs. Machado; Las Vegas, NV, US	March 12, 2026	252 days (incumbent)	1. def. Sabrina Gondim at UFC BJJ 8 on May 21, 2026	

=== Women's Flyweight ===
116 to 125 pounds

No.	Name	Event	Date	Reign	Defenses	Ref.
1	(Brazil) Cassia Moura def. Adele Fornarino	UFC BJJ 12: Moura vs. Fornarino; Las Vegas, NV, US	Oct 8, 2026	42 days (incumbent)		

== Partnerships ==
=== Hayabusa Fightwear ===
In June 2025, Hayabusa Fightwear was announced as the first official outfitter of UFC BJJ. The Ontario-based combat sports brand has partnered with the UFC to design and produce kits for UFC BJJ athletes and coaches, including those on the new reality show UFC BJJ: Road to the Title. Beginning in July, the collaboration will expand to retail and online sales, starting with rash guards, shorts, and spats, followed by t-shirts, hoodies, and more.

== See also ==
- Ultimate Fighting Championship
- Brazilian jiu-jitsu
- Brazilian jiu-jitsu ranking system
