= UFC BJJ 6 =

Martial arts event in 2026

UFC BJJ 6: Fowler vs. Machado
- The poster for UFC BJJ 6: Fowler vs. Machado
- Promotion: UFC Brazilian Jiu-Jitsu
- Date: March 12, 2026
- Venue: Meta Apex
- City: Enterprise, Nevada, United States

Event chronology
| UFC BJJ 5: Musumeci vs. Montague | UFC BJJ 6: Fowler vs. Machado | UFC BJJ 7: Tackett vs. Rocha |

UFC BJJ 6: Fowler vs. Machado was a submission grappling event produced by UFC Brazilian Jiu-Jitsu (UFC BJJ), held at the Meta APEX in Las Vegas, Nevada, United States, on March 12, 2026. It was broadcast live around the world on UFC Fight Pass.

== Background ==
The event was headlined by Mason Fowler's first defense of the UFC BJJ light heavyweight championship against Pedro Machado. In the co-main event, 20-year-old Cassia Moura faced ADCC world champion Ffion Davies for the inaugural UFC BJJ women's bantamweight title. Davies was making her promotional debut.

Two-time Craig Jones Invitational champion Nick Rodriguez also made his UFC BJJ debut, meeting Elder Cruz in a heavyweight bout. The two had previously met at Tezos WNO: Craig Jones vs. Pedro Marinho in January 2022, where Cruz won by split decision when Rodriguez was a purple belt.

Elsewhere on the card, João Miyao faced Jussier Formiga at bantamweight in his UFC BJJ debut.

== Results ==
Main card (UFC Fight Pass, YouTube)
| Weight class | | | | Method | Round | Time | Notes |
|---|---|---|---|---|---|---|---|
| Light Heavyweight | Mason Fowler (c) | def. | Pedro Machado | Decision (unanimous) | 3 | 5:00 | (Note: For the UFC BJJ Light Heavyweight Championship.) |
| Women's Bantamweight | Cassia Moura | def. | Ffion Davies | Decision (split) | 3 | 5:00 | (Note: For the inaugural UFC BJJ Women's Bantamweight Championship.) |
| Heavyweight | Nick Rodriguez | vs. | Elder Cruz | Draw (majority) | 3 | 5:00 |
| Featherweight | Meyram Maquine | def. | Marcos Mendes | Submission (armbar) | 2 | 3:29 |
| Women's Bantamweight | Ana Rodrigues | def. | Jasmin Rocha | Decision (split) | 3 | 5:00 |
| Heavyweight | Devhonte Johnson | def. | Lucas Norat | Decision (unanimous) | 3 | 5:00 |
| Bantamweight | Joao Miyao | def. | Jussier Formiga | Decision (unanimous) | 3 | 5:00 |
| Middleweight | Manuel Ribamar | def. | Caio Vinicius Santos | Decision (unanimous) | 3 | 5:00 |

== See also ==
- UFC BJJ
