= UFC BJJ 12 =

2026 combat sport event in Nevada, US

UFC BJJ 12: Moura vs. Fornarino
- The poster for UFC BJJ 12: Moura vs. Fornarino
- Promotion: UFC Brazilian Jiu-Jitsu
- Date: October 8, 2026
- Venue: Meta Apex
- City: Enterprise, Nevada, United States

Event chronology
UFC BJJ 11: Musumeci vs. Mitchell	UFC BJJ 12: Moura vs. Fornarino	UFC BJJ 13: Tackett vs. Rodriguez

UFC BJJ 12: Moura vs. Fornarino was a submission grappling event produced by UFC Brazilian Jiu-Jitsu (UFC BJJ) on October 8, 2026, at the Meta APEX in Las Vegas, Nevada, United States. It was broadcast live around the world on UFC Fight Pass.

== Background ==
A UFC BJJ Women's Flyweight Championship bout for the inaugural title and UFC BJJ Women's Flyweight Grand Prix Final between reigning UFC BJJ Women's Bantamweight champion Cassia Moura and champion in two weight classes at the 2024 ADCC World Championship Adele Fornarino headlined the event.

A UFC BJJ Lightweight Championship bout for the vacant title between gi and no-gi IBJJF World Champion Renato Canuto and Ethan Crelinsten co-headlined the event. On July 10th, 2026 current champion Lucas Valente announced he was vacating his title to pursue MMA.

== Fight card ==
Main card (UFC Fight Pass)
Weight class				Method	Round	Time	Notes
Women's Flyweight	Cassia Moura	def.	Adele Fornarino	Desicion (split)	3	5:00	(Note: For the UFC BJJ Women's Flyweight Grand Prix Final and inaugural UFC BJJ Women's Flyweight Championship)
Lightweight	Renato Canuto	def.	Ethan Crelinsten	Decision (unanimous)	3	5:00	(Note: For the vacant UFC BJJ Lightweight Championship.)
Middleweight	Gabriel Almeida	def.	Gilbert Burns	Submission (heel hook)	1	4:34
Women's Strawweight	Thaynara Victoria	def.	Danielle Kelly	Submission (armbar)	1	2:53
Lightweight	Landon Elmore	def.	Max Livingston	Submission (straight ankle lock)	1	3:42
Welterweight	Kade Anastasios	def.	Ataide Rafael	Submission (heel hook)	1	4:19
Featherweight	Raphael Ferreira	def.	Kyle O'Hare	Submission (heel hook)	1	3:14
Lightweight	John Chandler	def.	Raphael Gomez	Decision (unanimous)	3	5:00

== See also ==
- UFC BJJ
