= UFC BJJ 13 =

2026 combat sport event in Nevada, US

UFC BJJ 13: Tackett vs. Rodriguez
- The poster for UFC BJJ 13: Tackett vs. Rodriguez
- Promotion: UFC Brazilian Jiu-Jitsu
- Date: October 29, 2026
- Venue: Meta Apex
- City: Enterprise, Nevada, United States

Event chronology
UFC BJJ 12: Moura vs. Fornarino	UFC BJJ 13: Tackett vs. Rodriguez	UFC BJJ 14: Tackett vs. Wojcik

UFC BJJ 13: Tackett vs. Rodriguez was a submission grappling event produced by UFC Brazilian Jiu-Jitsu (UFC BJJ) on October 29, 2026, at the Meta APEX in Las Vegas, Nevada, United States. It was broadcast live around the world on UFC Fight Pass.

== Background ==
A UFC BJJ Middleweight Championship bout for the vacant title between former UFC BJJ Middleweight challenger William Tackett and Jay Rodriguez headlined the event. The pair previously met at 2023 ADCC East Coast Trials and 2024 ADCC West Coast Trials, where Tackett won both matches. Current champion Ronaldo Júnior vacated the title due to a injury which will need surgery.

A UFC BJJ Bantamweight Championship bout for the vacant title between two-time IBJJF World Champion Jalen Fonacier and UFC BJJ Opens winner Kleber Barboza co-headlined the event. The pair previously met three times at colored belt tournaments in 2023 and 2024, where Barboza holds a 2-1 edge. On October 8th, 2026 current champion Mikey Musumeci announced he was vacating to pursue MMA.

== Fight card ==
Main card (UFC Fight Pass)
Weight class				Method	Round	Time	Notes
Middleweight	William Tackett	def.	Jay Rodriguez	Submission (rear-naked choke)	1	1:26	(Note: For the vacant UFC BJJ Middleweight Championship)
Bantamweight	Jalen Fonacier	def.	Kleber Barbosa	Decision (unanimous)	3	5:00	(Note: For the vacant UFC BJJ Bantamweight Championship.)
Light Heavyweight	Nick Rodriguez	def.	Nata Tenca	Submission (arm-triangle choke)	3	3:07
Women’s Bantamweight	Ffion Davies	def.	Jaine Fragoso	Submission (arm-triangle choke)	1	2:07
Women’s Flyweight	Jasmine Rocha	def.	Karen Antunes	Submission (armbar)	1	0:38
Heavyweight	Pat Downey	def.	Ian Daube	Decision (unanimous)	3	5:00
Welterweight	Liam Crelinsten	def.	Seilkhan Bolatbek	Submission (heel hook)	2	1:26
Middleweight	Joao Nicolite	def.	Martin Gonzalez	Decision (unanimous)	3	5:00
Lightweight	Tristan Sainz	def.	David Weintraub	Submission (rear-naked choke)	1	4:53

== See also ==
- UFC BJJ
