= UFC BJJ 3 =

Martial arts event in 2025

UFC BJJ 3: Musumeci vs. Carrasco
- The poster for UFC BJJ 3: Musumeci vs. Carrasco
- Promotion: UFC Brazilian Jiu-Jitsu
- Date: October 2, 2025
- Venue: UFC Apex
- City: Enterprise, Nevada, United States

Event chronology
UFC BJJ 2: Tackett vs. Canuto	UFC BJJ 3: Musumeci vs. Carrasco	UFC BJJ 4: Tackett vs. Dorsey

UFC BJJ 3: Musumeci vs. Carrasco was a submission grappling event produced by UFC Brazilian Jiu-Jitsu (UFC BJJ), held at the UFC Apex in Las Vegas, Nevada, United States, on October 2, 2025 and was streamed live on YouTube.

== Background ==
This event featured two title fights with UFC BJJ Bantamweight Champion Mikey Musumeci and UFC BJJ Lightweight Champion Carlos Henrique making their first title defenses.

The undercard sees UFC BJJ's new signing and two-time IBJJF world champion Jansen Gomes make his debut against longtime rival Gustavo Batista. Gomes and Batista are currently the number one and two ranked super middleweights in the gi, respectively, and this fight could have title implications.

Cassia Moura, the youngest no-gi world champion when she won it in 2024, faced the no-gi champion from the previous year and ADCC Trials winner Alex Enriquez.

After losing to Andrew Tackett for the inaugural UFC BJJ Welterweight Championship at UFC BJJ 1, Andy Varela is moving up to middleweight to face Daniel Sathler.

== Results ==
Main card (YouTube/UFC Fight Pass)
Weight class				Method	Round	Time	Notes
Bantamweight	Mikey Musumeci (c)	def.	Keven Carrasco	Submission (Mikey lock)	1	3:01	(Note: For the UFC BJJ Bantamweight Championship.)
Lightweight	Carlos Henrique (c)	def.	Matheus Gabriel	Decision (unanimous)	3	5:00	(Note: For the UFC BJJ Lightweight Championship.)
Lightweight	Samuel Nagai	def.	Kennedy Maciel	Decision (unanimous)	3	5:00
Women's Flyweight	Cassia Moura	def.	Alex Enriquez	Decision (unanimous)	3	5:00
Middleweight	Jansen Gomes	def.	Gustavo Batista	Decision (unanimous)	3	5:00
Welterweight	Andy Murasaki	def.	Kris Oliva	Submission (kimura)	3	4:38
Welterweight	Andy Varela	def.	Daniel Sathler	Submission (rear-naked choke)	2	4:15
Women's Flyweight	Ana Mayordomo	def.	Shye Lilly	Submission (armbar)	1	4:22
Bantamweight	Jalen Fonacier	def.	Pedro Nakano	Submission (heel hook)	1	1:13

== See also ==
- UFC BJJ
