= UFC BJJ 2 =

Martial arts event in 2025

UFC BJJ 2: Tackett vs. Canuto
- The poster for UFC BJJ 2: Tackett vs. Canuto
- Promotion: UFC Brazilian Jiu-Jitsu
- Date: July 31, 2025
- Venue: UFC Apex
- City: Enterprise, Nevada, United States

Event chronology
UFC BJJ 1: Musumeci vs. Gabriel	UFC BJJ 2: Tackett vs. Canuto	UFC BJJ 3: Musumeci vs. Carrasco

UFC BJJ 2: Tackett vs. Canuto was a submission grappling event produced by UFC Brazilian Jiu-Jitsu (UFC BJJ). The event was held at the UFC Apex in Las Vegas, Nevada, United States, on July 31, 2025 and was streamed live on YouTube.

== Background ==
This event featured two title fights. UFC BJJ Welterweight Champion Andrew Tackett made the first title defense by a champion in the promotion's history against former IBJJF Gi and No-Gi World Champion Renato Canuto in the main event.

In the co-main event, former European IBJJF Champion Mason Fowler faced David Garmo for the inaugural UFC BJJ Light Heavyweight Championship.

William Tackett, the older brother of UFC BJJ Welterweight Champion Andrew Tackett, made his promotional debut in the middleweight division against Kyle Chambers who previously submitted William in competition years ago.

Raquel Canuto, former UFC MMA fighter and wife of UFC BJJ welterweight title challenger Renato Canuto, made her UFC BJJ debut against Morgan Black in the women's featherweight division.

Kennedy Maciel, son of nine-time IBJJF and three-time ADCC Submission Fighting World Champion Rubens Charles Maciel, faced Ademir Barreto in the lightweight division.

Five-time IBJJF World Champion Tammi Musumeci, older sister of UFC BJJ Bantamweight Champion Mikey Musumeci, faced Leilani Bernales in the women's flyweight division.

Two-time IBJJF No-Gi World Champion Everton Teixeira faced grappling phenom Jalen Fonacier, who became the first ever Filipino IBJJF World Champion as a teenager.

== Results ==
Main card (YouTube / UFC Fight Pass / Facebook)
Weight class				Method	Round	Time	Notes
Welterweight	Andrew Tackett (c)	def.	Renato Canuto	Submission (D'Arce choke)	1	4:52	(Note: For the UFC BJJ Welterweight Championship.)
Light Heavyweight	Mason Fowler	def.	David Garmo	Submission (rear-naked choke)	1	2:15	(Note: For the inaugural UFC BJJ Light Heavyweight Championship.)
Middleweight	William Tackett	def.	Kyle Chambers	Submission (rear-naked choke)	1	2:51
Women's Featherweight	Raquel Canuto	def.	Morgan Black	Submission (kneebar)	1	2:21
Lightweight	Kennedy Maciel	def.	Ademir Barreto	Decision (unanimous)	3	5:00
Women's Featherweight	Aurélie Le Vern	def.	Maggie Grindatti	Submission (Americana)	1	1:19
Women's Flyweight	Tammi Musumeci	def.	Leilani Bernales	Decision (unanimous)	3	5:00
Bantamweight	Jalen Fonacier	def.	Everton Texeira	Submission (inside heel hook)	1	1:07

== See also ==
- UFC BJJ
