= Carlos Henrique Costas Campos =

Brazilian practitioner of Brazilian jiu-jitsu

Carlos Henrique
- Born: Carlos Henrique Costas Campos; July 6, 1999 (age 27); Manaus, Amazonas, Brazil
- Other names: CH7 ("Cê-Aga-Setchee")
- Height: 6 ft (183 cm)
- Weight: 155 lb (70 kg; 11 st 1 lb)
- Division: Lightweight (UFC BJJ) – 70 kilograms (155 lb); Lightweight – 76 kilograms (168 lb)
- Fighting out of: Houston, Texas, U.S.
- Team: Oranday Bros Jiu Jitsu
- Rank: Black belt in Brazilian Jiu-Jitsu

Carlos Henrique Costas Campos (born July 6, 1999) is a Brazilian submission grappler and Brazilian Jiu‑Jitsu black belt competitor signed to UFC Brazilian Jiu-Jitsu (UFC BJJ), where he was the inaugural UFC BJJ Lightweight Champion.

== Early life ==
Henrique was born and raised in Manaus, Amazonas, Brazil. As a child, he dreamt of becoming a professional football (soccer) player. In 2014, he began training jiu-jitsu at Nova União academy before considering a professional career in the sport the following year.

He initially joined the Dream Art academy in São Paulo in 2019 before moving to their academy in Texas where he was promoted to black belt under coach Isaque Bahiense in November 2022.

== UFC BJJ career ==
Henrique began his UFC Brazilian Jiu-Jitsu (UFC BJJ) career competing on UFC BJJ: Road to the Title. In the quarterfinal, he submitted Gianni Grippo via anaconda choke in round two. In the semi-final, he defeated Isaac Doederlein via armbar in the second round to setup a finals matchup against Danilo Moreira to crown the first ever UFC BJJ Lightweight Champion at UFC BJJ 1.

Henrique faced Moreira at UFC BJJ 1 in the UFC Apex on June 25, 2025. He forced Moreira to tap with an armbar submission at the end of the third and final round to capture the inaugural UFC BJJ Lightweight Championship.

Henrique defended his title for the first time against Matheus Gabriel in the co-main event of UFC BJJ 3 on October 2, 2025. He won the match by unanimous decision.

Henrique lost the title to Lucas Valente in his second title defense at UFC BJJ 7. Where he was submitted by Valente at 3 minutes and 3 seconds of the third round by foot lock.

== Championships and accomplishments ==
- UFC Brazilian Jiu-Jitsu
  - UFC BJJ Lightweight Champion (One time; Inaugural)
    - One successful title defense

=== Main achievements (black belt) ===
2023

- (gold) Pan IBJJF Jiu-Jitsu No-Gi Championship – Lightweight (162.6 lbs)
- (silver) American National IBJJF Jiu-Jitsu No-Gi Championship (Open Class)
- (silver) American National IBJJF Jiu-Jitsu No-Gi Championship – Lightweight (162.6 lbs)

2022

- (silver) World IBJJF Jiu-Jitsu No-Gi Championship – Lightweight (162.6 lbs)

=== Main achievements (colored belts) ===
2022

- (gold) World IBJJF Jiu-Jitsu Championship (Brown belt) – Lightweight (168 lbs)
- (gold) Brazilian Nationals Jiu-Jitsu Championship (Brown belt) – Featherweight
- (gold) Brazilian Nationals Jiu-Jitsu No-Gi Championship (Brown belt) – Lightweight
- (bronze) Brazilian Nationals Jiu-Jitsu No-Gi Championship (Brown belt) – Open Class
- (gold) American National IBJJF Jiu-Jitsu Championship (Brown belt) – Lightweight
- (gold) American National IBJJF Jiu-Jitsu No-Gi Championship (Brown belt) – Lightweight
- (silver) AJP Abu Dhabi World Pro (Brown belt) – Lightweight (69 kg)

2021

- (gold) Brazilian Nationals Jiu-Jitsu Championship (Purple belt) – Lightweight

2020

- (gold) AJP Abu Dhabi World Pro (Purple belt) – Lightweight (69 kg)
- (gold) European IBJJF Jiu-Jitsu Championship (Blue belt) – Lightweight (76 kg)

2019

- (bronze) Brazilian Nationals Jiu-Jitsu Championship (Blue belt) – Featherweight

== UFC BJJ record ==
Professional record breakdown
5 matches	4 wins	1 loss
By submission	3	1
By decision	1	0

Res.	Record	Opponent	Method	Event	Date	Round	Time	Location	Notes
Loss	4-1	Lucas Valente	Submission (foot lock)	UFC BJJ 7	April 2, 2026	3	3:03	Las Vegas, Nevada, United States	Lost the UFC BJJ Lightweight Championship.
Win	4–0	Matheus Gabriel	Decision (unanimous)	UFC BJJ 3	October 2, 2025	3	5:00	Las Vegas, Nevada, United States	Defended the UFC BJJ Lightweight Championship.
Win	3–0	Danilo Moreira	Submission (armbar)	UFC BJJ 1	June 25, 2025	3	3:09	Las Vegas, Nevada, United States	Won the inaugural UFC BJJ Lightweight Championship.
Win	2–0	Isaac Doederlein	Submission (armbar)	UFC BJJ: Road to the Title	Air date: June 23, 2025	2	1:09	Las Vegas, Nevada, United States	Semi-final.
Win	1–0	Gianni Grippo	Submission (anaconda choke)	UFC BJJ: Road to the Title	Air date: June 19, 2025	2	1:21	Las Vegas, Nevada, United States	Lightweight debut. Quarterfinal

== Instructor lineage ==
=== Brazilian Jiu-Jitsu ===
Carlos Gracie → Hélio Gracie → Rolls Gracie → Romero Cavalcanti → Alexandre Paiva → Fernando "Tererê" Augusto → Rubens Charles Maciel → Michael Langhi → Isaque Bahiense → Carlos Henrique

== See also ==
- UFC BJJ

Achievements
New championship	1st UFC BJJ Lightweight Champion; June 25, 2025 – present	Incumbent
