= UFC BJJ 7 =

Martial arts event in 2026

UFC BJJ 7: Tackett vs. Rocha
- The poster for UFC BJJ 7: Tackett vs. Rocha
- Promotion: UFC Brazilian Jiu-Jitsu
- Date: April 2, 2026
- Venue: Meta Apex
- City: Enterprise, Nevada, United States

Event chronology
UFC BJJ 6: Fowler vs. Machado	UFC BJJ 7: Tackett vs. Rocha	UFC BJJ 8: Musumeci vs. Dantzler

UFC BJJ 7: Tackett vs. Rocha was a submission grappling event produced by UFC Brazilian Jiu-Jitsu (UFC BJJ), held at the Meta APEX in Las Vegas, Nevada, United States, on April 2, 2026. It was broadcast live around the world on UFC Fight Pass.

== Background ==
The main event featured Andrew Tackett's third defense of the UFC BJJ welterweight championship against 43-year-old Vagner Rocha, who accepted the bout on short notice while at the venue coaching his daughter. Two other title bouts were also on the card: Carlos Henrique defended the UFC BJJ lightweight title against Lucas Valente, and Aurélie Le Vern put her women's featherweight belt on the line against Rebeca Lima.

The undercard featured 18-year-old Raphael Ferreira, as well as Rana Willink, daughter of Jocko Willink and two-time ADCC world champion Adele Fornarino.

== Results ==
Main card (YouTube)
Weight class				Method	Round	Time	Notes
Welterweight	Andrew Tackett (c)	def.	Vagner Rocha	Decision (unanimous)	3	5:00	(Note: For the UFC BJJ Welterweight Championship.)
Lightweight	Lucas Valente	def.	Carlos Henrique (c)	Submission (straight footlock)	3	3:07	(Note: For the UFC BJJ Lightweight Championship.)
Women's Featherweight	Rebeca Lima	def.	Aurélie Le Vern (c)	Decision (unanimous)	3	5:00	(Note: For the UFC BJJ Women's Featherweight Championship.)
Welterweight	Renato Canuto	def.	Yonathan Cardenas	Decision (unanimous)	3	5:00
Women's Flyweight	Adele Fornarino	def.	Alex Enriquez	Submission (kneebar)	1	2:02
Heavyweight	Declan Moody	def.	Patrick Gaudio	Submission (rear-naked choke)	1	3:38
Featherweight	Raphael Ferreira	def.	Kenzo Biyong	Submission (rear-naked choke)	1	2:05
Women's Featherweight	Rana Willink	def.	Carol Joia	Submission (kneebar)	3	2:34

== See also ==
- UFC BJJ
