= UFC BJJ 4 =

Martial arts event in 2025

UFC BJJ 4: Tackett vs. Dorsey
- The poster for UFC BJJ 4: Tackett vs. Dorsey
- Promotion: UFC Brazilian Jiu-Jitsu
- Date: December 11, 2025
- Venue: UFC Apex
- City: Enterprise, Nevada, United States

Event chronology
UFC BJJ 3: Musumeci vs. Carrasco	UFC BJJ 4: Tackett vs. Dorsey	UFC BJJ 5: Musumeci vs. Montague

UFC BJJ 4: Tackett vs. Dorsey was a submission grappling event produced by UFC Brazilian Jiu-Jitsu (UFC BJJ), held at the UFC Apex in Las Vegas, Nevada, United States, on December 11, 2025 and was streamed live on YouTube.

== Background ==
The event was headlined by three championship bouts. Andrew Tackett made the second defense of his UFC BJJ welterweight title, while his older brother, William Tackett, met former IBJJF No-Gi world champion Ronaldo Júnior for the inaugural middleweight championship. In the women's division, Aurelie Le Vern faced Raquel Canuto to crown the promotion's first women's featherweight champion.

Elsewhere on the card, 10-time IBJJF world champion Mayssa Bastos made her promotional debut against Tubby Alequin in a women's strawweight bout. Recent two-time ADCC Trials winner Dorian Olivarez took on 2023 IBJJF world champion Samuel Nagai in a lightweight matchup.

The women's featherweight division also featured a high-profile bout between Bella Mir, daughter of former UFC heavyweight champion Frank Mir, and Rana Willink, daughter of former Navy SEAL Jocko Willink. Additionally, UFC veteran Jussier Formiga, who recently turned 40, squared off against Lucas Pinheiro, a former IBJJF Gi and No-Gi world champion who is ten years his junior.

== Results ==
Main card (YouTube / UFC Fight Pass / Pluto TV)
Weight class				Method	Round	Time	Notes
Welterweight	Andrew Tackett (c)	def.	Elijah Dorsey	Submission (heel hook)	1	2:21	(Note: For the UFC BJJ Welterweight Championship.)
Middleweight	Ronaldo Júnior	def.	William Tackett	Decision (unanimous)	3	5:00	(Note: For the inaugural UFC BJJ Middleweight Championship.)
Women's Featherweight	Aurélie Le Vern	def.	Raquel Canuto	Submission (kimura)	1	3:38	(Note: For the inaugural UFC BJJ Women's Featherweight Championship.)
Women's Strawweight	Mayssa Bastos	def.	Tubby Alequin	Decision (unanimous)	3	5:00
Welterweight	Renato Canuto	def.	Alan Sanchez	Decision (unanimous)	3	5:00
Lightweight	Dorian Olivarez	def.	Samuel Nagai	Decision (unanimous)	3	5:00
Welterweight	Andy Varela	def.	Robby Malof	Submission (inside heel hook)	3	1:52
Women's Featherweight	Bella Mir	def.	Rana Willink	Decision (majority)	3	5:00
Featherweight	Landon Elmore	def.	Nate Hernandez	Submission (foot lock)	1	0:42
Bantamweight	Jussier Formiga	def.	Lucas Pinheiro	Decision (unanimous)	3	5:00

== See also ==
- UFC BJJ
