= Hayabusa (disambiguation) =

Hayabusa is a Japanese robot asteroid mission from 2003 to 2010, a.k.a. MUSES-C.

Hayabusa (隼 or はやぶさ、ハヤブサ) is the Japanese word for a falcon, especially a Peregrine falcon. Hayabusa also may refer to:

== Civilian transport ==
- Suzuki Hayabusa, motorcycle
- Manshū Hayabusa, 1930s airliner

=== Rail ===
- Hayabusa (train), Japanese named Shinkansen service
- Hayabusa (sleeper train), Japanese sleeper train service which ran until 2009
- Hayabusa, British Rail Class 43 (HST), train with Hitachi experimental hybrid-power technology
- Hayabusa Station in Tottori Prefecture in Japan

== Japanese military vehicles ==
- Nakajima Ki-43 Hayabusa, World War II fighter airplane

=== Watercraft ===
- Hayabusa-class torpedo boat of the Imperial Japanese Navy
- Hayabusa-class patrol boat, post-war Japan Maritime Self-Defense Force missile boat

== Space exploration ==
- Hayabusa2, asteroid-targeted mission, launched in 2014
- Hayabusa Mk2, comet-targeted mission series, launching 2018 or later

== Other ==
- Hayabusa (Mulan), Shan-Yu's pet saker falcon in the 1998 animated film Mulan
- Hayabusa (wrestler), ring name of Japanese wrestler Eiji Ezaki (1968–2016)
- Ryu Hayabusa, fictional video-game character
- Hayabusa: Harukanaru Kikan, film
- Goodbye Hayabusa, two professional wrestling events produced by Frontier Martial-Arts Wrestling (FMW) in 1999
- Hayabusa Fightwear, boxing gloves
- Hayabusa Terra, a surface feature on the dwarf planet, Pluto

== See also ==
- Hayabusachō, district in Tokyo
