= Aurelie Le Vern =

French Brazilian jiu-jitsu practitioner (born 1991)

Aurélie Le Vern
- Born: 12 July 1991 (age 35); Aix en Provence, France
- Division: Medium-heavyweight −74 kg
- Fighting out of: French Guiana
- Team: Six Blades Jiu-Jitsu
- Trainer: Tyrone Gonsalves
- Rank: BJJ black belt (Note: Under Tyrone Gonsalves)

Other information
- Occupation: BJJ instructor

Aurélie Le Vern (born 12 July 1991) is a French Brazilian jiu-jitsu black belt practitioner signed to UFC Brazilian Jiu-Jitsu (UFC BJJ). A three-time World and IBJJF European Open Champion in colored belts, Le Vern is a IBJJF World Championship and IBJJF Pan Championship medallist. In 2025, she became the inaugural UFC BJJ Women's Featherweight Champion.

== Career ==
Aurélie Le Vern was born on 12 July 1991 in Aix en Provence, France. After finishing a degree in physical education in 2016, Le Vern moved to French Guiana to work as a Sport teacher. Le Vern started practicing judo then in 2017 Brazilian jiu-jitsu at a local Ribeiro academy under coach Tyrone Gonsalves.

Le Vern earned all her belts from Gonsalves while training and competing. As a blue belt in 2019, she became IBJJF World Champion, European Champion (in Openweight) and Pan Champion. In 2022 she won double gold (in her weight and in Openweight) in the brown belt division at the Pan Championship. In 2023 she quit her teaching job to focus on her career. She received her black belt in January 2023, after only 5.5 years, while standing on the podium of the 2023 Brazilian Jiu-Jitsu European Championship. In her first year as black belt, Le Vern won bronze at the 2023 Pan Jiu-Jitsu Championship, followed by bronze at the 2023 World Jiu-Jitsu Championship.

Le Vern won gold medals in both the heavyweight and absolute divisions of the no gi edition of the Campeonato Brasileiro de Jiu-Jitsu on September 24, 2023. Le Vern then competed in the ADCC Natal Open 2023 on October 8, winning gold medals in the under 65 kg division and the absolute division.

=== 2024 ===
Le Vern won a gold medal in the medium-heavyweight division of the IBJJF European Championship on January 27, 2024.

Le Vern competed in the under 65 kg division of the ADCC European, Middle-Eastern, and African Trials 2024. She won a gold medal and an invite to 2024 ADCC World Championship.

Le Vern competed against Helena Crevar at UFC Fight Pass Invitational 7 on May 15, 2024. She lost the match by decision.

Le Vern faced Crevar again in the opening round of the 2024 ADCC World Championship on August 17–18, 2024 and she lost by submission. She then won gold medals in the medium-heavyweight and absolute divisions of the IBJJF No Gi European Championship on October 20, 2024.

Le Vern competed against Ana Carolina Vieira at ADXC 7 on November 17, 2024. She won the match by decision.

=== 2025 ===
Le Vern started the year by winning a silver medal in the medium-heavyweight division of the IBJJF European Championship 2025. She subsequently won a silver medal in the medium-heavyweight division of the IBJJF Pan Championship 2025.

At the Campeonato Brasileiro de Jiu-Jitsu (Brasileirão) 2025, Le Vern reached the final of the medium-heavyweight black belt division, taking silver after a loss to Maria Vicentini by decision (6–2). In April, at the IBJJF Brazilian National No-Gi Championship, she secured double gold, winning both the medium-heavyweight and absolute divisions.

Le Vern competed against Salla Simola at ADXC 9 in Paris on April 19, 2025. She lost the match by decision.

In July 2025, Le Vern competed at UFC BJJ 2, defeating Maggie Grindatti-Lira via submission (Americana) in 1 minute and 19 seconds.

On December 11, 2025, Le Vern competed at UFC BJJ 4 in Las Vegas for the inaugural women's featherweight title (-65.7 kg). Facing Raquel Canuto, Le Vern won via submission in the first round using a kimura lock.

This victory made her the first female champion in UFC BJJ history, and she was awarded the "Submission of the Night" honors.

== Championships and accomplishments ==
=== Main Achievements (Black Belt) ===
- UFC Brazilian Jiu-Jitsu
  - UFC BJJ Women's Featherweight Champion (One time; Inaugural and current)
- IBJJF European Championship
  - Champion (2024)
  - Second Place (2025)
- IBJJF Pan Championship
  - Second Place (2025)
  - Third Place (2023)
- IBJJF World Championship
  - Third place (2023)
- Campeonato Brasileiro de Jiu-Jitsu
  - Second Place (2025)
- ADCC European Trials
  - Winner (2024)

=== Main Achievements (Colored Belts) ===
- 1st IBJJF World Champion (2019 blue, 2021 purple, 2022 brown)
- 1st IBJJF European Open Champion (2019 blue (Note: Absolute) / 2020 blue, 2023 brown)
- 1st IBJJF Pan Championship Champion (2019 blue, 2022 (Note: Weight & Absolute) brown)
- 2nd place IBJJF World Championship (2021 purple)
- 2nd place IBJJF World No-Gi Championship (2022 brown)
- 3rd place IBJJF World Championship (2022 brown)
- 3rd place IBJJF European Open (2019 blue)

== UFC BJJ record ==
Professional record breakdown
3 matches	2 wins	1 loss
By submission	2	0
By decision	0	1

Res.	Record	Opponent	Method	Event	Date	Round	Time	Location	Notes
Loss	2–1	Rebeca Lima	Unanimous decision	UFC BJJ 7	April 2, 2026	3	5:00	Las Vegas, Nevada, United States	Lost the belt UFC BJJ Women's Featherweight Championship.
Win	2–0	Raquel Canuto	Submission (kimura)	UFC BJJ 4	December 11, 2025	1	3:38	Las Vegas, Nevada, United States	Won the inaugural UFC BJJ Women's Featherweight Championship.
Win	1–0	Maggie Grindatti	Submission (Americana)	UFC BJJ 2	July 31, 2025	1	1:19	Las Vegas, Nevada, United States	

== Instructor lineage ==
Carlos Gracie > Helio Gracie > Royler Gracie > Saulo Ribeiro > Alexandre Ribeiro > Tyrone Gonsalves > Aurélie Le Vern
