= William Tackett =

American practitioner of Brazilian jiu-jitsu (born 2001)

- Born: May 14, 2001 (age 25); Orange County, California, U.S.
- Height: 5 ft 10 in (178 cm)
- Weight: 185 lb (84 kg; 13 st 3 lb)
- Division: Middleweight – 84 kilograms (185 lb)
- Fighting out of: Austin, Texas, U.S.
- Team: Fight Factory
- Trainer: Rodrigo Cabral
- Rank: Black belt in Brazilian Jiu-Jitsu (Note: under Rodrigo "Brucutu" Cabral.)

William Tackett (born May 14, 2001) is an American submission grappler and Brazilian jiu-jitsu black belt competitor signed to UFC Brazilian Jiu-Jitsu (UFC BJJ), where he is the current UFC BJJ Middleweight Champion.

== Early life ==
Tackett was born in Orange County, California and moved to Austin, Texas when he was a child. When a jiu-jitsu gym opened near his home in 2009, his father signed him and his younger brother Andrew up, later joined by younger brother Caleb. Andrew and William soon changed gyms to Brazilian Fight Factory where they were trained by Rodrigo "Brucutu" Cabral. Another notable BJJ mentor of Tackett is Carlos Gracie Jr.

On March 28, 2021, Tackett was promoted to black belt by coach Cabral.

== Professional grappling career ==
Tackett faced Kyle Chambers at UFC BJJ 2 on July 31, 2025. He won the match by rear-naked choke in the first round.

Tackett faced former IBJJF No-Gi world champion Ronaldo Júnior for the inaugural UFC BJJ Middleweight Championship on December 11, 2025, at UFC BJJ 4. He lost the bout by unanimous decition.

Tackett was scheduled to face Enrico Said on May 21, 2026, at UFC BJJ 8. However, Said withdrew from the event and was replaced by Manuel Ribamar. Tackett won the bout by heel hook in the first round.

Tackett faced Fedor Nikolov on August 20, 2026, at UFC BJJ 10. He won the bout by heel hook in the second round.

Tackett faced Jay Rodriguez for the vacant UFC BJJ Middleweight Championship at the main event of UFC BJJ 13 on October 29, 2026. The pair previously met at 2023 ADCC East Coast Trials and 2024 ADCC West Coast Trials, where Tackett won both matches. He won the title by rear-naked choke in the first round.

== Championships and accomplishments ==
- UFC Brazilian Jiu-Jitsu
  - UFC BJJ Middleweight Champion (One time; current)
