= Mikey Musumeci =

American practitioner of Brazilian jiu-jitsu

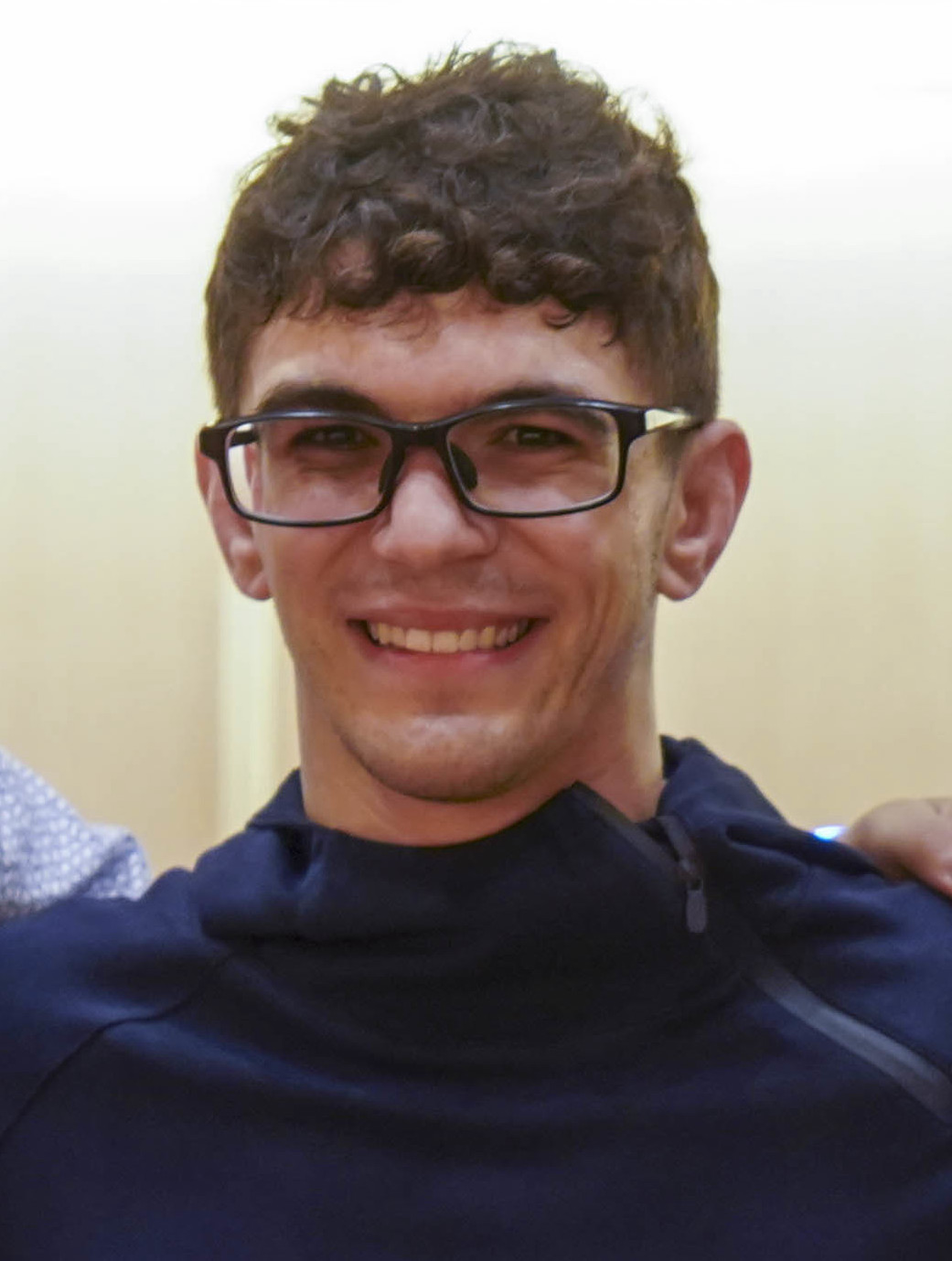
- Musumeci in 2022
- Born: Michael Musumeci Jr. July 7, 1996 (age 30); Marlboro, New Jersey, U.S.
- Nickname: Darth Rigatoni
- Height: 5 ft 7 in (170 cm)
- Weight: 134 lb; 9.6 st (61 kg)
- Division: Feather / Rooster: Gi Weight Classes; Under 64 kilograms (141 lb); No-Gi Weight Classes; Under 61.5 kilograms (136 lb)
- Reach: 67 in (170 cm)
- Style: Brazilian jiu-jitsu
- Team: Pedigo Submission Fighting; Caio Terra Association (Note: From 2016 to 2020); Atos / Art of Jiu Jitsu (Note: until 2016); Evolve MMA; Cobrinha BJJ
- Rank: 3rd degree black belt in Brazilian jiu-jitsu

Other information
- Notable relatives: Tammi Musumeci (sister)

Michael Musumeci Jr. (born July 7, 1996) is an American submission grappler and Brazilian jiu-jitsu black belt (Note: under Gilbert Burns and Jonatas Gurgel) competitor currently signed to UFC Brazilian Jiu-Jitsu (UFC BJJ), where he is the inaugural and current UFC BJJ Bantamweight Champion. A four-time World Champion and Pan American Champion in colored belts, Musumeci is a five-time IBJJF black belt World Champion (four times in Gi and once in No-Gi), and the first American to win more than one IBJJF World title at black belt. He formerly competed in ONE Championship where he was the inaugural Flyweight Submission Grappling World Champion.

== Early life ==
Michael Musumeci Jr. was born in Marlboro, New Jersey, on July 7, 1996. Musumeci is of Italian ancestry. (Note: Musumeci mentioned his Italian ancestry on the Joe Rogan Podcast JRE MMA Show No. 127.) He began training Brazilian jiu-jitsu (BJJ) at age 4 along with his sister Tammi at Fatjo's Martial Arts Academy under coach Fernando "Cabeça". When he was 10 his family moved to Florida. While training at various academies, he met brothers Rafael and Guilherme Mendes of Art of Jiu Jitsu (AOJ) (Note: at the time affiliated with ATOS) during a seminar, starting a long relationship with the brothers and their academy. Starting at juvenile blue belt, Musumeci won IBJJF world championships at every belt level. In 2014 Guilherme Mendes awarded him his brown belt right after his 2014 purple belt world title while on the podium. In 2015 aged 18, Musumeci received his black belt from Gilbert Burns.

== Black belt career ==
The following year Musumeci won the 2016 Pan American Championship at roosterweight followed by the World No-Gi Championship. In 2016, he switched teams, joining Caio Terra's association. In 2017, Musumeci won the UAEJJF World Pro at black belt in the 62 kg weight class. In 2017, he won the World Championship in the Lightfeather division. In 2018, Musumeci became World Champion for the second time. Fighting in a lower weight division, he won the World Championship two more times in 2019 and 2021.

=== 2021 ===
Musumeci made his Who's Number One debut on March 26, where he submitted Marcelo Cohen with an armbar from the triangle choke position. On May 28, Musumeci returned to WNO, submitting Lucas Pinheiro with a heelhook. Musumeci's third WNO match was against Edwin 'Junny' Ocasio on June 18, and Musumeci won the bout by unanimous decision. Musumeci was then invited to compete in the inaugural WNO Championships event, taking part in the tournament for the promotion's Lightweight title. Musumeci faced Gabriel Sousa in the opening round and was submitted by north-south choke, removing him from the competition. Musumeci then competed for the inaugural WNO Bantamweight title on October 20. He submitted Richard Alarcon with a leglock that has since been dubbed 'The Mikey Lock', and won the belt.

Musumeci was scheduled to make his ADCC debut at the 2022 ADCC World Championship after receiving an invite to the event. During the build-up, the promotion staged their first 'Road to ADCC' event on July 17, where Musumeci faced fellow ADCC 2022 competitor Geo Martinez, beating him 6-0 on points. After the conclusion of the match, both Martinez and his coach Eddie Bravo confronted Musumeci as they exchanged heated words on the mat. He was forced to withdraw from ADCC 2022 as a result of injury, but has since called for a rematch with Martinez regardless. The pair were originally scheduled for a rematch on March 25, but the match was postponed and did not come to fruition.

At the end of 2021, Musumeci and his sister Tammi both changed gyms and joined Pedigo Submission Fighting to train under Heath Pedigo.

=== 2022 ===
Musumeci defended the WNO Bantamweight title against Estevan Martinez on January 21, winning by unanimous decision. Soon after, he signed with ONE Championship. After signing with ONE Championship, Musumeci switched gyms once again and moved to Singapore to train at Evolve MMA.

After signing with ONE Championship, Musumeci faced Masakazu Imanari in a grappling bout at ONE 156 on April 22. He submitted Imanari by the way of rear-naked choke, and won the $50,000 'Performance of the Night' bonus as a result.

Musumeci faced Cleber Sousa for the inaugural ONE Flyweight Submission Grappling World Championship on October 1, at ONE on Prime Video 2. Musumeci won the match and the belt via unanimous decision at the end of the 10 minutes.

=== 2023 ===
Musumeci was scheduled to make his first title defense against Sayan Khertek on January 14, at ONE on Prime Video 6. However, Khertek forced to withdraw due to injury and was replaced by Gantumur Bayanduuren. Musumeci defeated Bayanduuren by unanimous decision and retained his title. It came to light afterward that Bayanduuren suffered several severe injuries to his leg as a result of submission attempts by Musumeci during the match.

Musumeci was scheduled to make his second title defense against Osamah Almarwai at ONE Fight Night 10 on May 5. He won the match by rear-naked choke at 8:03 and retained the flyweight title.

Musumeci defended his flyweight submission grappling title against Jarred Brooks at ONE Fight Night 13 on August 5. He won the match with an armbar and retained his title.

Musumeci competed against Shinya Aoki in an openweight grappling match at ONE Fight Night 15 on October 6. He won the match by submission, with an Aoki lock.

=== 2024 ===
In February 2024, Musumeci announced that he was leaving Pedigo Submission Fighting and would be joining Cobrinha BJJ to train under Rubens Charles Maciel.

Musumeci competed against Gabriel Sousa in a bantamweight match at ONE 167 on June 7. He won the match by submission.

Musumeci was booked to compete in a superfight at the inaugural Craig Jones Invitational on August 16–17. However, the match fell through and was cancelled.

Musumeci was set to challenge Kade Ruotolo for his ONE lightweight submission grappling title on September 6 at ONE 168: Denver. However, on September 1, it was announced that Ruotolo had withdrawn from the bout due to injury.

On November 2, Musumeci announced that he was no longer going to compete in ONE Championship. Musumeci then signed an exclusive contract with UFC Fight Pass and made his debut in the main event of UFC Fight Pass Invitational 9 on December 5 against Felipe Machado. He won the match by decision.

=== 2025 ===
Musumeci faced Rerisson Gabriel for the inaugural UFC BJJ Bantamweight World Championship in the main event of UFC BJJ 1 at the UFC Apex on June 25. He won the match via a heel hook submission at the 1:12 mark of the third round.

On October 2, Musumeci defended his title against Keven Carrasco at UFC BJJ 3. He won the bout via submission with a Mikey lock, a modified heel hook named after him.

=== 2026 ===
On February 12, Musumeci defended his title against Shay Montague at UFC BJJ 5. He submitted Montague via foot lock in the second round.

On May 21, Musumeci defended his title for the third time by submitting Kevin Dantzler with a heel hook in the first round at UFC BJJ 8.

On September 24, Musumeci faced UFC fighter Bryce Mitchell in a non-title featherweight bout at UFC BJJ 11, winning by unanimous decision.

== Personal life ==
Musumeci is of Italian descent. He is a Star Wars fan and started using the nickname 'Darth Rigatoni' to reference both that and his love of pasta after a fan came up with the idea.

His sister, Tammi Musumeci, is also a Brazilian jiu-jitsu competitor.

On November 5, 2023, Musumeci announced a partnership deal with Meta.

== Championships and accomplishments ==
- UFC Brazilian Jiu-Jitsu
  - UFC BJJ Bantamweight World Championship (One time; Inaugural and current)
    - Three successful title defenses
  - First athlete to headline a UFC BJJ event (UFC BJJ 1)
- ONE Championship
  - ONE Flyweight Submission Grappling World Championship (One time; Inaugural & Final)
    - Three successful title defenses
  - Performance of the Night (Five times) vs. Jarred Brooks, Osamah Almarwai and Masakazu Imanari, and Shinya Aoki, and Gabriel Sousa
  - Most wins in One Championship Submission Grappling (7)
  - Most title defenses in One Championship Submission Grappling (3)
- Who's Number One
  - WNO Bantamweight Championship (One time; Inaugural and Final)
    - One successful title defense

=== Main achievements (black belt) ===
2021

- (gold) IBJJF World Championship

2020

- (gold) IBJJF European Championship
- (gold) IBJJF Foley International Open Championship
- (silver) SJJIF Las Vegas International Open (closed out division with teammate Rene Lopez)

2019

- (gold) IBJJF World Championship
  - World record holder for fastest submission in an IBJJF world championship adult black belt final.
- (gold) SJJIF Golden State Open

2018

- (gold) IBJJF World Championship

2017

- (gold) IBJJF World Championship
  - First American to win multiple IBJJF World titles at black belt.
- (gold) IBJJF European Championship
- (gold) UAEJJF Abu Dhabi World Professional Championship

2016

- (gold) IBJJF No-Gi World Championship
- (gold) IBJJF Pan-American Championship
- (gold) UAEJJF Abu Dhabi Grand Slam World Tour
- (gold) IBJJF American Nationals
- (gold) IBJJF Chicago Summer International Open

2015

- (gold) IBJJF American Nationals

=== Main achievements (colored belts) ===
2015

- (gold) IBJJF World Championship (brown belt)
- (gold) IBJJF Pan-American Championship (brown belt)

2014

- (gold) IBJJF World Championship (purple belt)
- (gold) IBJJF Pan-American Championship (purple belt)

2013

- (gold) IBJJF Juvenile World Championship (blue belt)
- (gold) IBJJF Juvenile Pan-American Championship (blue belt)

2012

- (gold) IBJJF Juvenile World Championship (blue belt)
- (gold) IBJJF Juvenile Pan-American Championship (blue belt)

2011

- (gold) IBJJF Juvenile No-Gi World Championship (blue belt)
- (gold) IBJJF Juvenile Pan-American Championship (blue belt)

== Career record ==
Professional Brazilian Jiu-Jitsu record (incomplete); 77 Matches, 72 Wins (40 Submissions), 5 Losses (2 Submissions), 0 Draws
Result	Rec.	Opponent	Method	Event	Date	Location	Notes
Win	72–5	(United States) Bryce Mitchell	Decision (unanimous)	UFC BJJ 11	September 24, 2026	(United States) Las Vegas, Nevada	Non-title featherweight bout.
Win	71–5	(United States) Kevin Dantzler	Submission (heel hook)	UFC BJJ 8	May 21, 2026	(United States) Las Vegas, Nevada	Defended UFC BJJ Bantamweight Championship.
Win	70–5	(Scotland) Shay Montague	Submission (foot lock)	UFC BJJ 5	February 12, 2026	(United States) Las Vegas, Nevada	Defended the UFC BJJ Bantamweight Championship.
Win	69–5	(United States) Keven Carrasco	Submission (Mikey lock)	UFC BJJ 3	October 2, 2025	(United States) Las Vegas, Nevada	Defended the UFC BJJ Bantamweight Championship.
Win	68–5	(Brazil) Rerisson Gabriel	Submission (heel hook)	UFC BJJ 1	June 25, 2025	(United States) Las Vegas, Nevada	Won the inaugural UFC BJJ Bantamweight Championship.
Win	67–5	(Brazil) Felipe Machado	Decision (points)	UFC Fight Pass Invitational 9	December 5, 2024	(United States) Las Vegas, Nevada	
Win	66–5	(Brazil) Joao Gabriel Sousa	Submission (calf slicer)	ONE 167	June 8, 2024	Bangkok, Thailand	Bantamweight bout.
Win	65–5	(Japan) Shinya Aoki	Submission (inside heel hook)	ONE Fight Night 15	October 7, 2023	Bangkok, Thailand	Openweight bout.
Win	64–5	(United States) Jarred Brooks	Submission (triangle armbar)	ONE Fight Night 13	August 5, 2023	Bangkok, Thailand	Defended the ONE Flyweight Submission Grappling World Championship.
Win	63–5	(Yemen) Osamah Almarwai	Submission (rear-naked choke)	ONE Fight Night 10	May 5, 2023	(United States) Broomfield, Colorado	Defended the ONE Flyweight Submission Grappling World Championship.
Win	62–5	(Mongolia) Bayanduuren Gantumur	Decision (unanimous)	ONE Fight Night 6	January 14, 2023	Bangkok, Thailand	Defended the ONE Flyweight Submission Grappling World Championship.
Win	61–5	(Brazil) Cleber Souza	Decision (unanimous)	ONE on Prime Video 2	October 1, 2022	Kallang, Singapore	Won the inaugural ONE Flyweight Submission Grappling World Championship.
Win	60–5	(Japan) Masakazu Imanari	Submission (rear naked choke)	ONE 156	April 22, 2022	Kallang, Singapore	
Win	59–5	(England) Kevin Corkhill	Submission (ankle lock)	Grapplefest 11	February 26, 2022	(England) Liverpool, Merseyside	
Win	58–5	(United States) Estevan Martinez	Decision (unanimous)	Who's #1: Craig Jones vs. Pedro Marinho	January 21, 2022	(United States) Dallas, Texas	Defended WNO Bantamweight Championship.
Win	57–5	(Brazil) Francisco Jonas Andrade	Submission (straight ankle lock)	2020 IBJJF World Jiu-Jitsu Championship	December 8, 2021	(United States) Anaheim, California	Won gold medal.
Win	56–5	(Brazil) Carlos "Bebeto" Oliveira	Submission (straight ankle lock)	2020 IBJJF World Jiu-Jitsu Championship	December 8, 2021	(United States) Anaheim, California	Won gold medal.
Win	55–5	(Brazil) Bruno Malfacine	Decision (points)	2020 IBJJF World Jiu-Jitsu Championship	December 8, 2021	(United States) Anaheim, California	Won gold medal.
Win	54–5	(United States) Mario Esquivies	Submission (heel hook)	2021 Jiu-Jitsu World League Finals California	November 20, 2021	(United States) Fullerton, California	Won gold medal.
Win	53–5	(United States) Gabriel Villalobos	Submission (heel hook)	2021 Jiu-Jitsu World League Finals California	November 20, 2021	(United States) Fullerton, California	Won gold medal.
Win	52–5	(United States) Richard Alarcon	Submission (leg lock)	Who's #1: The Return of Gordon Ryan	October 20, 2021	(United States) Austin, Texas	Won the inaugural WNO Bantamweight Championship.
Loss	51–5	(Brazil) João Gabriel Sousa	Submission (north south choke)	2021 FloGrappling WNO Championship: Day 1	September 25, 2021	(United States) Austin, Texas	Lightweight tournament.
Win	51–4	(United States) Geovanny Martinez	Decision (points)	Road to ADCC	July 18, 2021	(United States) Austin, Texas	
Win	50–4	(United States) Edwin Ocasio	Decision (unanimous)	Who's #1: Craig vs. Ruotolo	June 18, 2021	(United States) Austin, Texas	
Win	49–4	(Brazil) Lucas Pinheiro	Submission (inside heel hook)	Who's #1: Gordon Ryan vs. Luiz Panza	May 28, 2021	(United States) Austin, Texas	
Win	48–4	(United States) Marcelo Cohen	Submission (triangle armbar)	Who's #1: Gordon Ryan vs. Vagner Rocha	March 26, 2021	(United States) Austin, Texas	
Win	47–4	(United States) Orlando Castillo	Submission (gi choke from the back)	2020 IBJJF Foley International Open	October 24, 2020	(United States) Foley, Alabama	Won gold medal.
Win	46–4	(United States) Suraj Budhram	Submission (ezekiel choke)	2020 IBJJF Foley International Open	October 24, 2020	(United States) Foley, Alabama	Won gold medal.
Loss	45–4	(Brazil) Horlando Monteiro	Submission (kata gatame)	2020 IBJJF Pan Jiu-Jitsu Championship	October 8, 2020	(United States) Kissimmee, Florida	
Loss	45–3	(Brazil) Mahamed Aly	Advantage	2020 IBJJF European Jiu-Jitsu Championship	January 20, 2020	Lisbon, Portugal	Absolute (weight class)
Win	45–2	(Italy) Jacopo Pasquini	Submission (choke from the back)	2020 IBJJF European Jiu-Jitsu Championship	January 20, 2020	Lisbon, Portugal	Absolute (weight class)
Win	44–2	(Brazil) Francisco Jonas Andrade	Decision (split)	2020 IBJJF European Jiu-Jitsu Championship	January 20, 2020	Lisbon, Portugal	Won gold medal.
Win	43–2	(United States) Suraj Budhram	Submission (ezekiel choke)	2020 IBJJF European Jiu-Jitsu Championship	January 20, 2020	Lisbon, Portugal	Won gold medal.
Win	42–2	(Brazil) Diego Oliveria Batista	Submission (straight ankle lock)	2020 IBJJF European Jiu-Jitsu Championship	January 20, 2020	Lisbon, Portugal	Won gold medal.
Win	41–2	(Morocco) Seif-Eddine Houmine	Advantage	2020 IBJJF European Jiu-Jitsu Championship	January 20, 2020	Lisbon, Portugal	Won gold medal.
Win	40–2	(United States) Joseph Lee	Submission (omoplata)	World Jiu Jitsu Festival: Day 1	October 5, 2019	(United States) Long Beach, California	
Win	39–2	(United States) Geoff Villarreal	Submission (gi choke from the back)	2019 SJJIF Golden State Open	September 21, 2019	(United States) San Diego, California	Won gold medal.
Win	38–2	(United States) Ari Tavira	Submission (triangle armbar)	2019 SJJIF Golden State Open	September 21, 2019	(United States) San Diego, California	Won gold medal.
Win	37–2	(Brazil) Bruno Malfacine	Decision (points)	2019 IBJJF World Jiu-Jitsu Championship	May 30, 2019	(United States) Long Beach, California	Won gold medal.
Win	36–2	(Brazil) Rodnei Barbosa	Submission (straight ankle lock)	2019 IBJJF World Jiu-Jitsu Championship	May 30, 2019	(United States) Long Beach, California	Won gold medal.
Win	35–2	(Japan) Shohei Watanabe	Decision (points)	2019 IBJJF World Jiu-Jitsu Championship	May 30, 2019	(United States) Long Beach, California	Won gold medal.
Win	34-2	(Japan) Koji Shibamoto	Decision (points)	2019 IBJJF World Jiu-Jitsu Championship	May 30, 2019	(United States) Long Beach, California	Won gold medal.
Win	33–2	(Brazil) Eduard Lisboa	Submission (armbar)	2018 IBJJF World Jiu-Jitsu Championship	May 30, 2018	(United States) Long Beach, California	Won gold medal.
Win	32–2	(Brazil) Ary Farias	Decision (points)	2018 IBJJF World Jiu-Jitsu Championship	May 30, 2018	(United States) Long Beach, California	Won gold medal.
Win	31–2	(Brazil) Alexssandro Sodré	Submission (ezekiel choke)	2018 IBJJF World Jiu-Jitsu Championship	May 30, 2018	(United States) Long Beach, California	Won gold medal.
Win	30–2	(Brazil) José Barros	Decision (points)	2018 IBJJF World Jiu-Jitsu Championship	May 30, 2018	(United States) Long Beach, California	Won gold medal.
Win	29–2	(Brazil) Rafael Freitas	Submission (footlock)	Absolute Berkut Championship Jiu-Jitsu 10	January 26, 2018	São Paulo, Brazil	
Win	28–2	(Brazil) João Miyao	Advantage	2017 IBJJF World Jiu-Jitsu Championship	June 1, 2017	(United States) Long Beach, California	Won gold medal.
Win	27–2	(Brazil) Ary Farias	Advantage	2017 IBJJF World Jiu-Jitsu Championship	June 1, 2017	(United States) Long Beach, California	Won gold medal.
Win	26–2	(United States) Isaac Doederlein	Advantage	2017 IBJJF World Jiu-Jitsu Championship	June 1, 2017	(United States) Long Beach, California	Won gold medal.
Win	25–2	(Brazil) Washington Lima	Submission (straight ankle lock)	2017 IBJJF World Jiu-Jitsu Championship	June 1, 2017	(United States) Long Beach, California	Won gold medal.
Win	24–2	(France) Mathias Jardin	Submission (straight ankle lock)	2017 Abu Dhabi World Professional Jiu-Jitsu Championship	April 17, 2017	Abu Dhabi, United Arab Emirates	Won gold medal.
Win	23–2	(Brazil) Hiago George	Decision (points)	2017 Abu Dhabi World Professional Jiu-Jitsu Championship	April 17, 2017	Abu Dhabi, United Arab Emirates	Won gold medal.
Win	22–2	(Mexico) Alexis Alduncin	Decision (points)	2017 Abu Dhabi World Professional Jiu-Jitsu Championship	April 17, 2017	Abu Dhabi, United Arab Emirates	Won gold medal.
Win	21–2	(Brazil) Cleber Sousa	Decision (points)	2017 Abu Dhabi World Professional Jiu-Jitsu Championship	April 17, 2017	Abu Dhabi, United Arab Emirates	Won gold medal.
Loss	20–2	(Brazil) Cleber Sousa	Decision	2017 IBJJF Pan Jiu-Jitsu Championship	March 15, 2017	(United States) Irvine, California	
Win	20–1	(United States) Ryan Clay	Submission (footlock)	2017 IBJJF Pan Jiu-Jitsu Championship	March 15, 2017	(United States) Irvine, California	
Win	19–1	(Brazil) Hiago George	Decision	2017 IBJJF European Jiu-Jitsu Championship	January 17, 2017	(Portugal) Odivelas, Lisbon	Won gold medal.
Win	18–1	(United States) Ryan Clay	Submission (bow and arrow)	2017 IBJJF European Jiu-Jitsu Championship	January 17, 2017	(Portugal) Odivelas, Lisbon	Won gold medal.
Win	17–1	(Brazil) Gabriel Moraes	Decision (points)	2017 IBJJF European Jiu-Jitsu Championship	January 17, 2017	(Portugal) Odivelas, Lisbon	Won gold medal.
Win	16–1	(Brazil) João Miyao	Decision (points)	2016 IBJJF World Jiu-Jitsu No-Gi Championship	November 5, 2016	(United States) San Francisco, California	Won gold medal.
Win	15–1	(Brazil) Thomas Lisboa	Advantage	2016 IBJJF World Jiu-Jitsu No-Gi Championship	November 5, 2016	(United States) San Francisco, California	Won gold medal.
Win	14–1	(Brazil) João Miyao	Decision (points)	2016 Abu Dhabi Grand Slam Los Angeles	September 3, 2016	(United States) Los Angeles, California	Won gold medal.
Win	13–1	(Brazil) José Barros	Decision (points)	2016 Abu Dhabi Grand Slam Los Angeles	September 3, 2016	(United States) Los Angeles, California	Won gold medal.
Win	12–1	(Brazil) João Marinho	Decision (points)	2016 IBJJF Chicago Summer International Open Jiu-Jitsu Championship	August 13, 2016	(United States) Chicago, Illinois	Won gold medal.
Win	11–1	(United States) Bruce Guevara	Decision (points)	2016 IBJJF Chicago Summer International Open Jiu-Jitsu Championship	August 13, 2016	(United States) Chicago, Illinois	Won gold medal.
Win	10–1	(Brazil) João Miyao	Advantage	2016 IBJJF American National Jiu-Jitsu Championship	July 8, 2016	(United States) Las Vegas, Nevada	Won gold medal.
Win	9–1	(Brazil) Mayko Araújo Borges	Decision (points)	2016 IBJJF American National Jiu-Jitsu Championship	July 8, 2016	(United States) Las Vegas, Nevada	Won gold medal.
Win	8–1	(Brazil) Luis Felipe "Ninja" Pinto	Submission (straight ankle lock)	2016 IBJJF World Jiu-Jitsu Championship	June 2, 2016	(United States) Long Beach, California	
Loss	7–1	(United States) Isaac Doederlein	Advantage	2016 IBJJF World Jiu-Jitsu Championship	June 2, 2016	(United States) Long Beach, California	
Win	7–0	(Japan) Tomoyuki Hashimoto	Advantage	2016 IBJJF Pan Jiu-Jitsu Championship	March 16, 2016	(United States) Irvine, California	Won gold medal.
Win	6–0	(Brazil) João Pedro "Somalia" Rodrigues	Submission (gi choke from back)	2016 IBJJF Pan Jiu-Jitsu Championship	March 16, 2016	(United States) Irvine, California	Won gold medal.
Win	5–0	(Brazil) Lucas Dos Santos Pinheiro	Decision (points)	2016 IBJJF Pan Jiu-Jitsu Championship	March 16, 2016	(United States) Irvine, California	Won gold medal.
Win	4–0	(Brazil) João Miyao	Advantage	2014 IBJJF Pan Jiu-Jitsu Championship	March 12, 2014	(United States) Irvine, California	Won gold medal.
Win	3–0	(United States) Suraj Budhram	Submission (ezekiel choke)	2014 IBJJF Pan Jiu-Jitsu Championship	March 12, 2014	(United States) Irvine, California	Won gold medal.
Win	2–0	(United States) Orlando Castillo	Submission (choke from the back)	2014 IBJJF Pan Jiu-Jitsu Championship	March 12, 2014	(United States) Irvine, California	Won gold medal.
Win	1–0	(Japan) Nobuo Yagai	Submission (choke from the back)	2014 IBJJF Pan Jiu-Jitsu Championship	March 12, 2014	(United States) Irvine, California	Won gold medal.

== Instructor lineage ==
=== Brazilian Jiu-Jitsu ===
Lineage 1

Carlos Gracie → Hélio Gracie → Carlson Gracie → André Pederneiras → Rafael Fofitio → Gilbert Burns → Michael Musumeci

Lineage 2

Carlos Gracie → Hélio Gracie → Carlson Gracie → André Pederneiras → João Roque → Jonatas Gurgel → Michael Musumeci

== See also ==
- List of Brazilian jiu-jitsu practitioners
- UFC BJJ
- List of ONE Championship champions
- World IBJJF Jiu-Jitsu Championship

== Notes ==
Achievements
New championship	1st UFC BJJ Bantamweight Champion; June 25, 2025 – present	Incumbent
New championship	1st ONE Flyweight Submission Grappling Champion; October 1, 2022 – September 5, 2024 Stripped	Vacant Title next held by Diogo Reis
New championship	1st WNO Bantamweight Champion; October 20, 2021 – January 2023 Disbanded	Vacant Division was disbanded
