= UFC BJJ 5 =

Martial arts event in 2026

UFC BJJ 5: Musumeci vs. Montague
- The poster for UFC BJJ 5: Musumeci vs. Montague
- Promotion: UFC Brazilian Jiu-Jitsu
- Date: February 12, 2026
- Venue: Meta Apex
- City: Enterprise, Nevada, United States

Event chronology
UFC BJJ 4: Tackett vs. Dorsey	UFC BJJ 5: Musumeci vs. Montague	UFC BJJ 6: Fowler vs. Machado

UFC BJJ 5: Musumeci vs. Montague was a submission grappling event produced by UFC Brazilian Jiu-Jitsu (UFC BJJ), held at the Meta Apex in Las Vegas, Nevada, United States, on February 12, 2026.

== Background ==
The event was headlined by two championship bouts. Mikey Musumeci made the second defense of his UFC BJJ bantamweight title against reigning IBJJF No-Gi European and World Champion Shay Montague, while Ronaldo Júnior attempted the first defense of his UFC BJJ middleweight title against reigning 174-pound IBJJF No-Gi World Champion Tarik Hopstock.

Following a year-long layoff due to injury, three-time IBJJF World Champion Nicholas Meregali returned to competition to face IBJJF No-Gi World Champion Nicholas Maglicic.

Former UFC BJJ welterweight title challenger Andy Varela faced Andy Murasaki, while Jonnatas Gracie and Yan Lucas made their respective promotional debuts against one another in a welterweight bout.

Elsewhere on the card, IBJJF World Champion Jalen Fonacier took on Carlos Oliveira, while former EBI Lightweight Champion Landon Elmore met former UFC BJJ title challenger Rerisson Gabriel.

== Results ==
Main card (YouTube)
Weight class				Method	Round	Time	Notes
Bantamweight	Mikey Musumeci (c)	def.	Shay Montague	Submission (foot lock)	2	4:09	(Note: For the UFC BJJ Bantamweight Championship.)
Middleweight	Ronaldo Júnior (c)	def.	Tarik Hopstock	Decision (unanimous)	3	5:00	(Note: For the UFC BJJ Middleweight Championship.)
Heavyweight	Nicholas Meregali	def.	Nicholas Maglicic	Decision (unanimous)	3	5:00
Welterweight	Andy Murasaki	def.	Andy Varela	Submission (armbar)	1	4:32
Women's Featherweight	Rebeca Lima	def.	Taylor Ellis	Submission (Estima lock)	2	3:55
Welterweight	Jonnatas Gracie	def.	Yan Lucas	Decision (unanimous)	3	5:00
Featherweight	Rerisson Gabriel	def.	Landon Elmore	Decision (unanimous)	3	5:00
Women's Flyweight	Carol Brunacio	def.	Mona Bailey	Decision (unanimous)	3	5:00
Bantamweight	Jalen Fonacier	def.	Carlos Oliveira	Submission (inside heel hook)	1	0:19

== See also ==
- UFC BJJ
