= Tammi Musumeci =

Brazilian jiu-jitsu practitioner from the US

- Born: July 8, 1994 (age 32); Marlboro Township, New Jersey, United States
- Division: Featherweight -58 kilograms (128 lb)
- Style: Brazilian Jiu-Jitsu
- Team: Brasa; Pedigo Submission Fighting; Caio Terra Association; Atos / Art of Jiu Jitsu; American Top Team
- Rank: Black belt in BJJ (Note: under Emyr Bussade)

Other information
- Occupation: Attorney
- Notable relatives: Mikey Musumeci (Brother)

Tammi Musumeci (born July 8, 1994) is an American submission grappler and black belt Brazilian jiu-jitsu competitor. A multiple times world champion in colored belts, Musumeci is a black belt world champion, a five-time No-Gi world champion and a two-time Pan American champion.

== Biography ==
Born on July 8, 1994, in New Jersey, Musumeci began training in Brazilian Jiu-Jitsu when she was six years old. After a successful competitive career in the colored belt divisions, having won the World Jiu-Jitsu Championship at every belt level, and with three Pan American titles (two at purple belt and one at brown), Musumeci was promoted to black belt in 2013 by Emyr "Shark" Bussade.

During her first year as a black belt, 19 years old Musumeci won the 2013 IBJJF World No-Gi Brazilian Jiu-Jitsu Championship, then won gold again in 2015 and 2016. Musumeci added two IBJJF Pan Championship gold medals in 2014 and 2017. Her silver medal in the 2016 edition of the tournament solidified her reputation as one of the most relentless and fearless competitors in the sport.

After defeating two former world champions to reach the 2016 Pan Finals, Musumeci lost to BJJ legend Michelle Nicolini in a memorable match during which Musumeci refused to tap to an armlock that eventually dislocated her arm. In 2019, Musumeci became world champion for the first time, having reached the final in 2014 and medalled twice previously. At the 2021 World Jiu-Jitsu Championship Musumeci won Silver after losing the Light-feather final by decision to Ana Rodrigues. At the 2022 World Jiu-Jitsu Championship Musumeci won silver in the light feather division.

As training partners, Tammi and her brother Michael "Mikey" Musumeci have won a combined nine International Brazilian Jiu-Jitsu Federation World Championship titles in gi and no-gi competition.

Outside of jiu-jitsu, Musumeci is an attorney, having graduated from the William S. Boyd School of Law at the University of Nevada, Las Vegas in 2020.

=== ONE Championship ===
Musumeci made her promotional debut against Bianca Basílio on March 25, 2023, at ONE Fight Night 8. She won the fight via unanimous decision.

Musumeci competed against Amanda 'Tubby' Alequin at ONE Fight Night 12 on July 14, 2023. She won the match by unanimous decision.

=== Outside ONE Championship ===
She then competed at the IBJJF No-Gi World Championship 2023, where she won the light-featherweight division.

Musumeci won a bronze medal in the under 55 kg division of the ADCC North American West Coast Trials 2024 on March 31, 2024.

=== UFC BJJ ===
Musumeci faced Leilani Bernales at UFC BJJ 2 on July 31, 2025. She won the match by unanimous decision.

== Brazilian Jiu-Jitsu competitive summary ==
Main Achievements at black belt level:

- IBJJF World Champion (2019)
- IBJJF Pan Champion (2014 / 2017)
- IBJJF World No-Gi Champion (2013 / 2015 / 2016 / 2022)
- 2nd Place IBJJF World Championship (2014 / 2021 / 2022)
- 2nd Place IBJJF World Championship No-Gi (2018)
- 2nd Place IBJJF Pan Championship (2016)
- 3rd Place IBJJF World Championship (2016 / 2017)

Main Achievements at colored belts:

- IBJJF World Jiu-Jitsu Champion (2010 blue)
- IBJJF Pan No-Gi Champion (2010 blue)
- IBJJF Pan Jiu-Jitsu Champion (2011 purple)
- IBJJF Pan No-Gi Champion (2011 purple)
- IBJJF World No-Gi Champion (2011 purple)
- IBJJF Pan Jiu-Jitsu Champion (2012 purple)
- IBJJF World Jiu-Jitsu Champion (2012 purple)
- IBJJF Pan Jiu-Jitsu Champion (2013 purple)
- IBJJF World Jiu-Jitsu Champion (2013 purple)

== UFC BJJ record ==
Professional record breakdown
1 match	1 win	0 losses
By decision	1	0

Res.	Record	Opponent	Method	Event	Date	Round	Time	Location	Notes
Win	1–0	Leilani Bernales	Decision (unanimous)	UFC BJJ 2	July 31, 2025	3	5:00	Las Vegas, Nevada, United States	Flyweight debut.

== Instructor lineage ==
Mitsuyo Maeda → Carlos Gracie → Carlson Gracie → Ricardo Libório → Emyr Bussade → Tammi Musumeci
