= Mason Fowler =

American martial artist (born 1993)

- Born: Mason Edward Fowler; January 18, 1992 (age 34); Fresno, California, U.S.
- Other names: The Mangler
- Height: 6 ft 0 in (183 cm)
- Weight: 205 lb (93 kg; 14 st 9 lb)
- Division: Welterweight (MMA); Light heavyweight (UFC BJJ)
- Team: Caio Terra Association (CTA)
- Rank: Black belt in Brazilian Jiu-Jitsu

Mixed martial arts record
- Total: 2
- Wins: 2
- By knockout: 1
- By submission: 1
- Losses: 0

Amateur record
- Total: 5
- Wins: 5
- By knockout: 2
- By submission: 3

Other information
- Mixed martial arts record from Sherdog

Mason Edward Fowler (born January 18, 1993) is an American submission grappler, Brazilian jiu-jitsu (BJJ) black belt competitor, and former mixed martial arts fighter currently signed to UFC BJJ, where he is the inaugural and current UFC BJJ Light Heavyweight Champion.

Fowler is a two-time IBJJF World Champion, two-time No-Gi World Champion, European Champion, and Pan-American Champion in colored belts. Mason is a black belt European Champion, CBJJ Brazilian Nationals Champion and a two-time ADCC Submission Fighting World Trials winner.

== Early life ==
Fowler was born on January 18, 1993, in Fresno, California, United States. Fowler started training mixed martial arts at Thrive MMA at the age of 18, eventually making his amateur debut. He went 5-0 as an amateur before turning professional.

== Mixed martial arts career ==
Fowler made his professional debut against Mike Ryan at TWC 21: Halloween Havoc 4 on October 24, 2014. He won the fight by Brabo choke in the first round.

Fowler competed against Marko Damiani at Bellator 133 on February 13, 2015. He won the fight by ground and pound in the first round.

== Early grappling career ==
Fowler retired from professional MMA with a 2-0 record and decided to pursue competitive Brazilian jiu-jitsu instead. He competed at smaller tournaments in between fights previously, and travelled to train under Caio Terra in preparation for the ADCC West Coast Trials 2019 as a brown belt.

=== 2019-2020 ===
Fowler defeated five opponents at the ADCC West Coast Trials and earned an invite to compete at the 2019 ADCC World Championship on September 28–29. He defeated Valdir Araujo in the opening round but was submitted by Craig Jones in the quarter-final.

Fowler then competed at Submission Underground 15 and won a tournament to earn the right to challenge Craig Jones in a rematch for the Submission Underground absolute championship. Fowler defeated Jones in EBI overtime in their match at Submission Underground 16 on July 12, 2020 and won the title. The pair had a third match in the main event of Submission Underground 17 on August 30, 2020 where Fowler won in EBI overtime once again. Fowler made his second title-defence against Vinny Magalhães at Submission Underground 18 on October 4, 2020. He won the match in EBI overtime.

Fowler defended his title for the third time against Satoshi Ishii at Submission Underground 19 on December 20, 2020. He won the match by submission in EBI overtime. Fowler returned at Submission Underground 20 on December 30, 2020 to face Ryan Bader in the main event. He won the match by armbar at 1:39 of regulation time.

=== 2021 ===
Fowler then competed against Richie 'Boogieman' Martinez at Submission Underground 21 on March 28, 2021. He won the match by submission and defended the title for the fifth time. He was then invited to compete in an absolute grand prix tournament at Third Coast Grappling 6 on April 6, 2021. He won his opening round match against Manuel Ribamar but lost in the next round to the eventual champion, Kaynan Duarte.

Fowler returned to Submission Underground to defend his title against Andy Varela at Submission Underground 22 on April 25, 2021 and won the match by submission in EBI overtime. He was booked to make his seventh consecutive title-defence against Kyle Chambers at Submission Underground 23 on May 23, 2021. He submitted Chambers with a rear-naked choke and retained his title.

Fowler competed at the IBJJF Pan Championship on September 1, 2021 where he won gold in the brown belt super-heavyweight division and a silver medal in the brown belt absolute division. He was then invited to compete in the heavyweight division of the Who's Number One Championships on September 25–26, 2021. He won his opening round match against Giancarlo Bodoni by decision, but could not continue in the tournament and had to withdraw.

Fowler competed at Submission Underground 27 on October 10, 2021 and successfully defended his title against Gabriel Checco, winning the match by submission in EBI overtime. Fowler then competed in the under 99 kg division at the ADCC East Coast trials 2021. Fowler defeated five opponents and earned an invite to compete at the 2022 ADCC World Championship. Fowler's final matches as a brown belt were at the IBJJF World Championship on December 12, 2021. He won a gold medal at super-heavyweight, a silver medal in the absolute division, and was promoted to black belt by Caio Terra on the podium.

== Black belt career ==
=== 2022-2023 ===
Fowler competed at the Campeonato Brasileiro de Jiu-Jitsu in 2022 and defeated three opponents in the ultra-heavyweight division to become one of only three Americans who have won the tournament at black belt. He then represented Team USA at Polaris 20 on June 25, 2022 where he submitted Kywan Gracie and registered draws against Micael Galvão, Fabricio Andrey, and Igor Tanabe.

Fowler competed at ADCC 2022 on September 17–18 and won his first match against Alexandre de Jesus, but lost in the quarter-final to Eoghan O'Flanagan. He was invited to compete in an absolute tournament at UFC Fight Pass Invitational 3 on December 15, 2022. Fowler defeated Pat Shahgholi, Patrick Gaudio, and Luke Griffith to win the tournament.

Fowler competed in the ultra-heavyweight and absolute divisions at the 2023 IBJJF European Championship on January 28–29. He won gold in the ultra-heavyweight division and a bronze medal in the absolute division.

Fowler was scheduled to compete against Gordon Ryan in the main event of UFC Fight Pass Invitational 5 on December 10, 2023. Ryan withdrew from the event and was replaced by Haisam Rida, and the match was moved earlier on in the card. Fowler won the match by submission with a kimura.

=== 2024 onwards ===
Fowler faced Pedro Marinho at UFC Fight Pass Invitational 6 on March 3, 2024. He won the match by submission.

Fowler competed against Nick Rodriguez in the main event of UFC Fight Pass Invitational 7 on May 15, 2024. He lost the match on points.

Fowler was invited to compete in the under 99 kg division of the 2024 ADCC World Championship on August 17–18, 2024, but he withdrew from the event in order to compete in the over 80 kg division of the inaugural Craig Jones Invitational on August 16–17, 2024, instead. He later had to withdraw from the Craig Jones Invitational as well.

Fowler was then brought in as the grappling coach for Team Sonnen on The Ultimate Fighter 33.

Fowler faced Christiano Troisi at UFC Fight Pass Invitational 11 on May 29, 2025. He won the match by submission with an omoplata.

=== UFC BJJ ===
Fowler faced David Garmo for the inaugural UFC BJJ Light Heavyweight Championship at UFC BJJ 2 on July 31, 2025. He won the match by rear-naked choke in the first round.

== Championships and accomplishments ==
- UFC BJJ
  - UFC BJJ Light Heavyweight Championship (One time; Inaugural and current)
- Submission Underground (SUG)
  - SUG Absolute Championship (One time)
    - Eight successful defenses
  - SUG Tournament Championship (One time)

=== Main achievements (pro circuit) ===
2023

- (gold) European IBJJF Jiu-Jitsu Championship
- (bronze) European IBJJF Jiu-Jitsu Championship – Open Class

2022

- (gold) Brazilian Nationals Jiu-Jitsu Championship

2021

- (gold) ADCC East Coast Trials

2019

- (gold) ADCC West Coast Trials

=== Main achievements (colored belts) ===
2021

- (gold) World IBJJF Jiu-Jitsu Championship (brown belt)
- (silver) World IBJJF Jiu-Jitsu Championship (brown belt) – Open Class

2020

- (gold) Pan IBJJF Jiu-Jitsu Championship (brown belt)
- (silver) Pan IBJJF Jiu-Jitsu Championship (brown belt) – Open Class

2019

- (bronze) World IBJJF Jiu-Jitsu No-Gi Championship (brown belt)
- (bronze) European IBJJF Jiu-Jitsu Championship (brown belt)

2018

- (gold) World IBJJF Jiu-Jitsu Championship (purple belt)
- (silver) World IBJJF Jiu-Jitsu Championship (purple belt) – Open Class
- (gold) European IBJJF Jiu-Jitsu Championship (purple belt)
- (silver) UAEJJF Abu Dhabi Grand Slam (purple belt)

2017

- (gold) World IBJJF Jiu-Jitsu No-Gi Championship (purple belt)
- (gold) World IBJJF Jiu-Jitsu No-Gi Championship (purple belt) – Open Class
- (silver) Pan IBJJF Jiu-Jitsu Championship (purple belt)
- (bronze) UAEJJF Abu Dhabi Grand Slam (purple belt)

== Mixed martial arts record ==
Professional record breakdown
2 matches	2 wins	0 losses
By knockout	1	0
By submission	1	0

Res.	Record	Opponent	Method	Event	Date	Round	Time	Location	Notes
Win	2–0	Marko Damiani	TKO (punches)	Bellator 133	February 13, 2015	1	1:02	Fresno, California, United States	
Win	1–0	Mike Ryan	Submission (brabo choke)	The Warriors Cage 21	October 24, 2014	1	0:28	Porterville, California, United States	

=== Amateur record ===
Amateur record breakdown		
5 matches	5 wins	0 losses
By knockout	2	0
By submission	3	0

Res.	Record	Opponent	Method	Event	Date	Round	Time	Location	Notes
Win	5–0	Raymond Ceballos	Submission (rear-naked choke)	Fighters Source	July 26, 2014	3	2:05	New York City, New York, United States	
Win	4–0	DeAndre Marshall	KO (strikes)	WFC 19	March 23, 2014	1	2:55	Las Vegas, Nevada, United States	
Win	3–0	Jeffrey Lewis	Submission (armbar)	559 Fights 20	December 6, 2013	2	0:37	Fresno, California, United States	
Win	2–0	Anthony Carpenter	TKO (punches)	Up & Comers 17	September 28, 2013	2	0:57	Fresno, California, United States	
Win	1–0	Bill Peck	Submission (rear-naked choke)	559 Fights 14	June 13, 2013	1	1:50	Fresno, California, United States	Welterweight debut.

== UFC BJJ record ==
Professional record breakdown
1 match	1 win	0 losses
By submission	1	0

Res.	Record	Opponent	Method	Event	Date	Round	Time	Location	Notes
Win	1–0	David Garmo	Submission (rear-naked choke)	UFC BJJ 2	July 31, 2025	1	2:15	Las Vegas, Nevada, United States	Won the inaugural UFC BJJ Light Heavyweight Championship.

== Instructor lineage ==
=== Brazilian Jiu-Jitsu ===
Carlos Gracie → Reylson Gracie → Paulo Maurício Strauch → Caio Terra → Mason Fowler

== See also ==
- UFC BJJ

Achievements
New championship	1st UFC BJJ Light Heavyweight Champion; July 31, 2025 – present	Incumbent
Preceded by Craig Jones	2nd Submission Underground Absolute Champion; July 12, 2020 – c. 2022	Promotion defunct
