= Andrew Tackett =

American practitioner of Brazilian jiu-jitsu

- Born: Andrew Henry Tackett; May 1, 2003 (age 23); Orange County, California, U.S.
- Other names: Pirulito
- Height: 5 ft 9 in (175 cm)
- Weight: 169 lb (77 kg; 12 st 1 lb)
- Division: Welterweight – 77 kilograms (170 lb); Middleweight – 82.3 kilograms (181.5 lb)
- Fighting out of: Austin, Texas, U.S.
- Team: Fight Factory
- Trainer: Rodrigo Cabral
- Rank: Black belt in Brazilian Jiu-Jitsu (Note: under Rodrigo "Brucutu" Cabral.)

Andrew Henry Tackett (born May 1, 2003) is an American submission grappler and Brazilian Jiu‑Jitsu black belt competitor signed to UFC Brazilian Jiu-Jitsu (UFC BJJ), where he is the inaugural and current UFC BJJ Welterweight Champion.

== Early life ==
Tackett was born in Orange County, California and moved to Austin, Texas when he was a child. When a jiu-jitsu gym opened near his home in 2009, his father signed him and his older brother William up, later joined by younger brother Caleb. Andrew and William soon changed gyms to Brazilian Fight Factory where they were trained by Rodrigo "Brucutu" Cabral. Another notable BJJ mentor of Tackett is Carlos Gracie Jr.

On December 17, 2022, Tackett was promoted to black belt by coach Cabral.

== UFC BJJ career ==
After signing with UFC Brazilian Jiu-Jitsu (UFC BJJ), Tackett competed on UFC BJJ: Road to the Title. In the quarterfinal, he defeated Aaron Wilson by rear naked choke in the first round. In the semi-final, he defeated Jason Nolf via rear-naked choke to setup a finals matchup against Andy Varela to crown the first ever UFC BJJ Welterweight Champion.

=== UFC BJJ Welterweight Championship ===
Tackett faced Varela at the UFC Apex in the co-main event of UFC BJJ 1 on June 25, 2025. He won the match via a rear naked choke submission in the first round capturing the inaugural UFC BJJ Welterweight Championship.

Tackett defended his title for the first time against Renato Canuto in the main event of UFC BJJ 2 on July 31, 2025. He won the match by D'Arce choke in the first round to become the first champion in UFC BJJ history to successfully defend his title.

Tackett faced Elijah Dorsey in the main event of UFC BJJ 4 on December 11, 2025. He successfully defended his title for the second consecutive time after submitting Dorsey via heel hook in the first round.

== Championships and accomplishments ==
- UFC Brazilian Jiu-Jitsu
  - UFC BJJ Welterweight Champion (One time; Inaugural and current)
    - Four successful title defenses

=== Main achievements (black belt) ===
2022

- (gold) ADCC Las Vegas Open (76 kg)
- (gold) ADCC Las Vegas Open (Absolute)
- (gold) Midwest Finishers Submission Only Tournament (185 lbs)
- (bronze) Who's Next Tournament

2024

- (gold) ADCC West Coast Trials (77 kg)

=== Main achievements (colored belts) ===
2021

- (gold) IBJJF No-Gi World Championship (Purple belt) (Middleweight)
- (gold) IBJJF No-Gi World Championship (Purple belt) (Absolute)

2022

- (gold) IBJJF No-Gi World Championship (Brown belt) (Middleweight)

== UFC BJJ record ==
Professional record breakdown
| 7 matches | 7 wins | 0 losses |
| By submission | 6 | 0 |
| By decision | 1 | 0 |

| Res. | Record | Opponent | Method | Event | Date | Round | Time | Location | Notes |
|---|---|---|---|---|---|---|---|---|---|
| Win | 7–0 | Jonnatas Gracie | Submission (rear-naked choke) | UFC BJJ 10 | August 20, 2026 | 1 | 1:44 | Las Vegas, Nevada, United States | Defended the UFC BJJ Welterweight Championship. |
| Win | 6–0 | Vagner Rocha | Decision unanimous | UFC BJJ 7 | April 2, 2026 | 3 | 5:00 | Las Vegas, Nevada, United States | Defended the UFC BJJ Welterweight Championship. |
| Win | 5–0 | Elijah Dorsey | Submission (heel hook) | UFC BJJ 4 | December 11, 2025 | 1 | 2:21 | Las Vegas, Nevada, United States | Defended the UFC BJJ Welterweight Championship. |
| Win | 4–0 | Renato Canuto | Submission (D'Arce choke) | UFC BJJ 2 | July 31, 2025 | 1 | 4:52 | Las Vegas, Nevada, United States | Defended the UFC BJJ Welterweight Championship. |
| Win | 3–0 | Andy Varela | Submission (rear-naked choke) | UFC BJJ 1 | June 25, 2025 | 1 | 2:50 | Las Vegas, Nevada, United States | Won the inaugural UFC BJJ Welterweight Championship. |
| Win | 2–0 | Jason Nolf | Submission (rear-naked choke) | UFC BJJ: Road to the Title | Air date: June 22, 2025 | 1 | 2:34 | Las Vegas, Nevada, United States | Semi-final. |
| Win | 1–0 | Aaron Wilson | Submission (rear-naked choke) | UFC BJJ: Road to the Title | Air date: June 16, 2025 | 1 | 1:10 | Las Vegas, Nevada, United States | Welterweight debut. Quarterfinal |

== Instructor lineage ==
=== Brazilian Jiu-Jitsu ===
Carlos Gracie → Hélio Gracie → Rolls Gracie → Romero Cavalcanti → Leonardo Vieira → Rodrigo Cabral → Andrew Tackett

== See also ==
- UFC BJJ

== Notes ==
Achievements
| New championship | 1st UFC BJJ Welterweight Champion; June 25, 2025 – present | Incumbent |
