= UFC BJJ 1 =

Martial arts event in 2025

UFC BJJ 1: Musumeci vs. Gabriel
- The poster for UFC BJJ 1: Musumeci vs. Gabriel
- Promotion: UFC Brazilian Jiu-Jitsu
- Date: June 25, 2025
- Venue: UFC Apex
- City: Enterprise, Nevada, United States

Event chronology
UFC BJJ 1: Musumeci vs. Gabriel	UFC BJJ 2: Tackett vs. Canuto

UFC BJJ 1: Musumeci vs. Gabriel was the first submission grappling event produced by UFC Brazilian Jiu-Jitsu (UFC BJJ), held at the UFC Apex in Las Vegas, Nevada, United States, on June 25, 2025 and was streamed live on YouTube.

== Background ==
This was the promotion's inaugural event and featured three title fights to crown the inaugural champions of the men's bantamweight, lightweight, and welterweight divisions.

The fight card was headlined by five-time IBJJF World Champion Mikey Musumeci competing against Rerisson Gabriel for the inaugural UFC BJJ Bantamweight Championship.

UFC BJJ: Road to the Title welterweight finalists Andrew Tackett and Andy Varela faced each other for the inaugural UFC BJJ Welterweight Championship, while lightweight finalists Carlos Henrique and Danilo Moreira fought each other for the inaugural UFC BJJ Lightweight Championship.

Bella Mir, daughter of former UFC Heavyweight Champion Frank Mir, made her promotional debut against Carol Joia in the women's featherweight division.

== Results ==
Main card (YouTube / UFC Fight Pass / Facebook)
Weight class				Method	Round	Time	Notes
Bantamweight	Mikey Musumeci	def.	Rerisson Gabriel	Submission (heel hook)	3	1:12	(Note: For the inaugural UFC BJJ Bantamweight Championship.)
Welterweight	Andrew Tackett	def.	Andy Varela	Submission (rear-naked choke)	1	2:50	(Note: For the inaugural UFC BJJ Welterweight Championship.)
Lightweight	Carlos Henrique	def.	Danilo Moreira	Submission (armbar)	3	3:09	(Note: For the inaugural UFC BJJ Lightweight Championship.)
Lightweight	Keith Krikorian	def.	João Assonitis	Submission (rear-naked choke)	2	2:53
Women's Flyweight	Cassia Moura	def.	Talita Alencar	Decision (unanimous)	3	5:00
Light heavyweight	Pedro Machado	def.	Felipe Pimental	Submission (triangle armbar)	2	2:42
Women's Featherweight	Bella Mir	def.	Carol Joia	Submission (D'Arce choke)	2	2:26
Lightweight	Keven Carrasco	def.	Ty Costlow	Submission (triangle choke)	1	4:41

== See also ==
- UFC BJJ
