= Alex Enriquez =

American-Filipino wrestler

- Born: February 18, 1999 (age 27); Manila, Philippines
- Style: Brazilian jiu-jitsu
- Team: Atos Jiu-Jitsu

Alexandria Luz Enriquez is an American Filipino submission grappler and Brazilian jiu-jitsu practitioner and wrestler.

== Early life ==
Alexandria Luz Enriquez was born on February 18, 1999 in Manila, Philippines. She and her family emigrated to the United States in 2004 and settled in Atlanta. She took up jiu-jitsu at age 11.

== Career ==
At the 58 kg women's grappling competition of the 2023 Grappling World Championships in Warsaw, Poland, Enriquez won the gold medal for the United States.

In Brazilian jiu-jitsu, Enriquez has been training under Bruno Frazatto since 2020 under Atos Jiu-Jitsu. Her first major black belt title was at the 2022 Pan IBJJF Jiu-Jitsu No-Gi Championship. The following year she attained the women's -63 kg title in the World IBJJF Jiu-Jitsu No-Gi Championship.

Enriquez made her debut in Ultimate Fighting Championship (UFC) in UFC BJJ 3. She lost to Cassia Moura during the event held on October 2, 2025.

She joined Philippine national ju-jitsu team in 2025. Enriquez later won the gold medal in the women's 63 kg division of the ju-jitsu tournament of the 2026 Asian Beach Games in Sanya, China.

== UFC BJJ record ==
Res.	Record	Opponent	Method	Event	Date	Round	Time	Location	Notes
Lost	0–1	Cassia Moura	Decision (unanimous)	UFC BJJ 3	October 2, 2025	3	5:00	Las Vegas, Nevada, United States	Featherweight debut
