= João Miyao =

Brazilian martial artist

- Born: João Ricardo Bordignon Miyao; 11 May 1991 (age 35); Andirá, Paraná, Brazil
- Nationality: Brazilian
- Division: Feather / Light-feather
- Style: Brazilian jiu-jitsu Sport jiu-jitsu
- Team: PSLPB Cicero Costha; Unity Jiu Jitsu (former member)
- Rank: Black belt in Brazilian jiu-jitsu (under Cicero Costha)

Other information
- Notable relatives: Paulo Miyao (twin brother)

João Ricardo Bordignon Miyao (born in 1991, in Andirá, Paraná, Brazil) is a Brazilian jiu-jitsu practitioner and submission grappling competitor. Known for his dynamic guard game and frequent use of the berimbolo, he is regarded as one of the most prominent athletes of his generation.

== Biography ==
Miyao was born in Andirá, Paraná, in 1991, alongside his twin brother Paulo Miyao. They are of Japanese descent and grew up in a humble family, children of a farmer and a housewife.

He began martial arts through judo, but at age 16 transitioned to Brazilian jiu-jitsu under Adriano Carvalho. Seeking higher-level training, the brothers moved to São Paulo and joined the PSLPB Cicero Costha project - Projeto Social Lutando Pelo Bem (Fighting for Good Social Project), where they lived and trained full time.

== Competitive career ==
João and Paulo stood out at the colored belt ranks with national and international titles, showing strong competitive drive. Both were promoted to black belt on June 25, 2013, in a ceremony covered by GracieMag, where they stated they "expected to win many World titles at black belt."

As a black belt, João actively competed in IBJJF tournaments, both gi and no-gi, and in submission-only grappling events such as the Eddie Bravo Invitational. His fight record on FloGrappling shows consistent appearances at major tournaments, including Worlds and Opens from 2018 to 2020.

He also earned notable titles outside the IBJJF. In 2017, he won the ACBJJ Grand Prix in the 60 kg division, defeating Isaac Doederlein in the final, according to GracieMag.

At the 2017 IBJJF European Championship, he suffered the first guard pass in three years of high-level competition, against Gabriel Moraes, as reported by FloGrappling.

His main achievements include:

- IBJJF World No-Gi Champion
- IBJJF Pan-American Champion
- Multiple-time medalist at IBJJF World Championships (gi)

== Fighting style ==
Miyao is known for his use of the berimbolo and modern guard variations, as well as his ability to compete in absolute divisions against heavier opponents. His resilience and frequent competition schedule earned him the nickname "BJJ marathon man."

== Physical challenges ==
After years of high-level competition, João has revealed the physical toll, including severe shoulder injuries and finger deformities.

== See also ==
- Paulo Miyao
