= Hayabusa Fightwear =

Canadian fitness equipment company

- Industry: Fitness
- Founded: 2006
- Founders: David Zikakis, Luke Harris, Craig and Ken Clement
- Headquarters: Kingston, Ontario, Canada

Hayabusa Fightwear is a Canadian fitness combat lifestyle company headquartered in Kingston, Ontario. The company specializes in manufacturing high-quality equipment and apparel for fitness, boxing, and martial arts.

It was founded in 2006 by David Zikakis, Luke Harris and brothers Craig and Ken Clement, and makes up a significant portion of the mixed martial arts equipment market.

The company came under scrutiny in 2013 following their production of a uniform featuring imagery of the Rising Sun Flag for UFC Welterweight champion Georges St-Pierre. The outfit was never brought to market; both Hayabusa and St-Pierre issued apologies after the latter's appearance at UFC 158.

Following the Ultimate Fighting Championship's decision to exclusively use Reebok-branded equipment, Hayabusa became the exclusive equipment provider for Glory.

== See also ==
- Mixed martial arts clothing
