= Raquel Paʻaluhi =

American mixed martial arts fighter

Raquel Paʻaluhi Canuto
- Born: Raquel Paʻaluhi; October 14, 1990 (age 36); Waiʻanae, Hawaii, U.S.
- Other names: Lionheart
- Height: 5 ft 7 in (1.70 m)
- Weight: 135 lb (61 kg; 9.6 st)
- Division: Bantamweight; Featherweight
- Reach: 69 in (180 cm)
- Style: Brazilian Jiu-Jitsu
- Stance: Orthodox
- Fighting out of: Las Vegas, NV
- Team: Checkmat
- Rank: Black belt in Brazilian Jiu-Jitsu under Robert Drysdale
- Years active: 2010–2017

Mixed martial arts record
- Total: 13
- Wins: 6
- By knockout: 2
- By submission: 1
- By decision: 3
- Losses: 7
- By submission: 4
- By decision: 3

Other information
- University: Jamestown College
- Notable school: Waianae High School
- Mixed martial arts record from Sherdog

Raquel Paʻaluhi Canuto (born October 14, 1990) is an American Brazilian jiu-jitsu grappler signed to the UFC and former mixed martial artist.

Paʻaluhi was awarded her Black Belt in Brazilian jiu-jitsu by her coach Robert Drysdale. Raquel is the 2014, 2015, 2016, 2017(bb), 2019(bb) and 2021(bb) No Gi World Champion and 2016-2018 World Jiu-Jitsu Championship Gi Runner Up.

== Personal life ==
Paʻaluhi is of Hawaiian, Portuguese, Samoan, German, and Irish descent. In 2016 she married Brazilian Jiujitsu Black Belt and World Champion Renato Canuto. Together they run Hybrid Jiujitsu.

== Professional grappling career ==
Paʻaluhi was booked to compete against Gillian Robertson at Submission Underground 23 on May 23, 2021. She won the match by submission. She then defeated Amanda Alequin at Fight 2 Win 174 on June 18, 2021. Paʻaluhi then challenged Amanda Loewen for the Submission Underground absolute title at Submission Underground 24 on June 27, 2021, although she lost the match in EBI overtime.

=== 2024-2025 ===
Paʻaluhi won a bronze medal in the middleweight division of the IBJJF European Championship on January 27, 2024.

Paʻaluhi faced Karol Rosa at UFC Fight Pass Invitational 6 on March 3, 2024. She won the match by submission with a rear-naked choke.

Paʻaluhi faced Aislinn O'Connell at UFC Fight Pass Invitational 7 on May 15, 2024. She won the match on points

Paʻaluhi faced Gabrielle McComb at UFC Fight Pass Invitational 8 on October 10, 2024. She won the match by submission.

Paʻaluhi then faced Michele Oliveira at UFC Fight Pass Invitational 9 on December 5, 2024. She won the match by submission.

Pa’aluhi faced Ana Vieira at UFC Fight Pass Invitational 11 on May 29, 2025. She lost the match by decision.

=== UFC BJJ ===
Pa’aluhi faced Morgan Black at UFC BJJ 2 on July 31, 2025. She won the match by submission with a kneebar in the first round.

== Mixed martial arts record ==
Professional record breakdown
13 matches	6 wins	7 losses
By knockout	2	0
By submission	1	4
By decision	3	3

Res.	Record	Opponent	Method	Event	Date	Round	Time	Location	Notes
Loss	6–7	Lisa Verzosa	Decision (split)	Invicta FC 42: Cummins vs. Zappitella	September 17, 2020	3	5:00	Kansas City, Kansas, United States	
Loss	6–6	Yana Kunitskaya	Decision (unanimous)	Invicta FC 25: Kunitskaya vs. Paʻaluhii	August 31, 2017	5	5:00	Lemoore, California, United States	For the vacant Invicta FC Bantamweight Championship.
Win	6–5	Pannie Kianzad	Submission (rear-naked choke)	Invicta FC 21: Anderson vs. Tweet	January 14, 2017	1	3:40	Kansas City, Missouri, United States	
Loss	5–5	Colleen Schneider	Decision (split)	Invicta FC 15: Cyborg vs. Ibragimova	January 16, 2016	3	5:00	Costa Mesa, California, United States	
Win	5–4	Ediane Gomes	Decision (unanimous)	Invicta FC 12: Kankaanpää vs. Souza	April 24, 2015	3	5:00	Kansas City, Missouri, United States	
Win	4–4	Kaitlin Young	Decision (unanimous)	Invicta FC 9: Honchak vs. Hashi	November 1, 2014	3	5:00	Davenport, Iowa, United States	
Win	3–4	Priscilla White	TKO (punches)	Destiny MMA Proving Grounds 2	August 24, 2013	1	3:03	Honolulu, Hawaii, United States	
Loss	2–4	Raquel Pennington	Submission (guillotine choke)	Destiny MMA Na Koa 1	September 8, 2012	1	3:52	Honolulu, Hawaii, United States	
Loss	2–3	Amanda Nunes	Technical Submission (rear-naked choke)	Invicta FC 2: Baszler vs. McMann	July 28, 2012	1	2:24	Kansas City, Kansas, United States	
Loss	2–2	Sara McMann	Submission (americana)	ProElite: Arlovski vs. Lopez	August 27, 2011	3	2:53	Honolulu, Hawaii, United States	
Win	2–1	Nikohl Johnson	TKO (punches)	X-1 Champions 3	March 12, 2011	3	2:06	Honolulu, Hawaii, United States	
Loss	1–1	Sarah D'Alelio	Submission (armbar)	X-1 Heroes	September 11, 2010	1	2:13	Honolulu, Hawaii, United States	
Win	1–0	Jenny Trujillo	Decision (unanimous)	X-1 Nations Collide	June 4, 2010	3	5:00	Honolulu, Hawaii, United States	
