= Adele Fornarino =

Australian grappler

- Born: 17 September 1999 (age 27); Melbourne, Australia
- Nickname: Daddy
- Weight: 53 kg (117 lb; 8 st 5 lb)
- Division: Featherweight
- Team: Dominance MMA; Atos Jiu-Jitsu
- Trainer: David Hart
- Rank: BJJ black belt (under David Hart)

Adele Marie Fornarino (born 17 September 1999) is an Australian grappler and Brazilian jiu-jitsu (BJJ) black belt competitor and coach. She became champion in two weight classes at the 2024 ADCC World Championship. As of October 7, 2025, Fornarino is ranked the #3 pound-for-pound women's no-gi grappler in the world by Flograppling

== Early life ==
Adele Fornarino was born on 17 September 1999, in Melbourne, Australia which she also grew up in. Her parents worked traditional corporate jobs and she followed her older brother in sports. She had no exposure to BJJ.

From age 7 to 14, Fornarino played soccer. In 2009 when she was 10 years old, Fornarino added BJJ to her weekly activities. Fornarino wanted to be a police officer and thought doing a martial art would help so she used google to search for gyms near her and the one she picked happened to be a BJJ gym.

Fornarino's first instructors were David Hart, David Christopher and Lincoln Handcock.

Fornarino's interest in BJJ took over her interest in soccer. She noticed that she preferred the individual accountability in BJJ over the team reliance in soccer. She also noticed BJJ gave her less knee pain than soccer.

At age 12, Fornarino competed in her first BJJ competition which she won. As she got older, a lack of female opponents led Fornarino to begin competing in the white belt adult divisions. In 2015, she won the Grappling Tournaments Australia which is a life-changing event in her career since it earned her a paid ticket to compete at the 2016 World IBJJF Jiu-Jitsu Championship.

At age 16, Fornarino started going overseas to compete in BJJ. At the 2016 World IBJJF Jiu-Jitsu Championship, Fornarino became champion as a Juvenile at Blue Belt level. After winning she realized how big BJJ was in the world compared to Australia. Due to her strong performances, at age 18, Fornarino made the decision to compete as in BJJ as a full-time career.

== Grappling career ==
Although Fornarino has spent the majority her time under the guidance of her coaches in Australia, in November 2022 she went to Atos Jiu-Jitsu to prepare for the 2022 World IBJJF Jiu-Jitsu No-Gi Championship. She regularly returned to Atos Jiu-Jitsu for training camps and has even represented it in some competitions.

Fornarino became known as a BJJ athlete during her time as a brown belt. Her most significant accomplishment was winning the 2022 World IBJJF Jiu-Jitsu No-Gi Championship as brown belt in the featherweight weight class.

In September 2022, Fornarino competed at the 2022 ADCC World Championship where she was eliminated in the first round by Ffion Davies via rear naked choke.

In December 2022, after being a brown belt for four years, Fornarino was promoted to black belt by Hart.

In 2023, Fornarino competed at the 2023 World Jiu-Jitsu Championship which was her first time competing at the world championships at a black belt. Although she had focused and built a reputation as a No-gi grappler, she found that competing in the gi was different and wasn't able to medal in that tournament. One of Fornarino's biggest goals is to be the first native Australian to win the world championship as a black belt in the gi.

=== 2024 onwards ===
On 9 February 2024, Fornarino came in on short notice to replace an injured Davies to compete against Tubby Alequin at WNO 22 which was her debut. In just 23 seconds, she submitted Alequin via leglock which tied with Nicky Ryan for fastest submission in WNO history.

In August 2024, Fornarino became champion at both her weight class and the absolute weight class at the 2024 ADCC World Championship. This made her the first Australian to win at the event as well as the first to win in the absolute weight class.

Fornarino was set to headline UFC Fight Pass Invitational 10 on 6 March 2025 where she would challenge Ffion Davies in the promotion’s first ever female main event. However Davies pulled out from the event due to a shoulder injury. The match was later rebooked for UFC Fight Pass Invitational 11 on May 29, 2025. Fornarino lost the bout by split decision.

Fornarino faced Jasmine Rocha in the co-main event of Who’s Number One 29 on July 25, 2025. She won the match by submission with an ankle-lock.

Fornarino faced Helena Crevar in the Semifinals of the Women's 100k tournament at CJI 2 on August 30, 2025. She lost the match by unanimous decision.

== Personal life ==
Fornarino's nickname 'Daddy" comes from her persona which is a playful yet empowering identity that symbolizes her confidence and determination. This persona helps her exude confidence and reduce self-doubt.

== Grappling competition achievements ==
Main Achievements:

As black belt:

- ADCC Submission Fighting World Championship (Champion in 2024 at both weight class and absolute)
- Pan IBJJF Jiu-Jitsu No-Gi Championship (Champion in 2023)
- European IBJJF Jiu-Jitsu No-Gi Championship (Champion in 2023)
- Campeonato Brasileiro de Jiu-Jitsu (2nd place in 2023)
- World IBJJF Jiu-Jitsu No-Gi Championship (2nd place in 2023)

== Instructor lineage ==
Carlos Gracie → Helio Gracie → Carlos Gracie Jr → Jean Jacques Machado / Rigan Machado → John Will → David Hart→ Adele Fornarino
