= UFC Apex =

Events facility at UFC

- Interactive map of UFC Apex
- Address: 6650 El Camino Road
- Location: Enterprise, Nevada, U.S.
- Coordinates: 36°4′4.8″N 115°13′40.8″W
- Owner: TKO Group Holdings (Endeavor)
- Capacity: Limited (~1000)
- Acreage: 130,000 square feet (12,000 m^{2})

Construction
- Opened: June 18, 2019

Website
- UFCapex.com

The UFC Apex, currently known as the Meta Apex as part of a naming rights agreement with Meta, is a live events and production center in Enterprise, Nevada, operated and owned by TKO Group Holdings (TKO). The venue hosts events held by various TKO divisions, including the Ultimate Fighting Championship (UFC), Zuffa Boxing, and WWE. The Apex also serves as the home venue of UFC BJJ and the UFC's other submission grappling projects, the Dana White-owned Power Slap league, and of the Contender Series program. The facility's location was chosen in part due to its close proximity to the UFC Performance Institute, which serves as the UFC's headquarters and is located across the street. The Apex was built to host live events as well as studio shows.

== History ==
Ari Emanuel, who owns the UFC's parent company, inquired about the availability of the warehouse next to the UFC headquarters in 2017. The warehouse was formerly the global headquarters of slot machine manufacturer Scientific Games. UFC bought the property in October 2018 for $40 million, and invested $30 million into making the property ready for media production.

The facility was officially opened on June 18, 2019. In the wake of the COVID-19 pandemic, following three events in Jacksonville, all U.S.-based UFC events were held at the Apex behind closed doors. After the end of the COVID-19 pandemic, the Apex continues to host select UFC Fight Night events (as well as Dana White's Contender Series cards), and now allows for limited public spectators. The Apex features the 25-foot wide Octagon variant typically used for smaller events and venues, as opposed to the standard 30-foot wide version. As UFC began staging the majority of its events at the Apex, early fight data and fan speculation suggested that the use of the smaller Octagon resulted in higher-volume and faster-pace striking fights, along with more finishes.

In late January 2022, there was an article from the Las Vegas Review-Journal stating the UFC Apex plans to expand seating up to 1,000 people, adding food / alcohol service, ticket sales, souvenir shop, along with adding extra parking.

In January 2026, the UFC announced that the UFC Apex would be renamed Meta Apex as part of a 5-year naming rights deal and branding partnership with Meta.

The Apex was revamped for the August 8, 2026 UFC Fight Night: Gamrot vs. Salkilld event, which had been expanded to increase its seating capacity.

== Events ==
=== TV programs hosted ===
Title	Broadcast	Time used as home venue	Ref
Dana White's Contender Series	Paramount+	June 18, 2019–present	

=== UFC events ===
Title	Event	Date	Ref
UFC Vegas 124	UFC Fight Night: Cortes-Acosta vs. Walker	November 7, 2026	
UFC Vegas 123	UFC Fight Night: Moicano vs. Nolan	October 31, 2026	
UFC Vegas 122	UFC Fight Night: Allen vs. Duncan	October 10, 2026	
UFC Vegas 121	UFC Fight Night: Rosas Jr. vs. Barcelos	September 26, 2026	
UFC Vegas 120	UFC Fight Night: Gamrot vs. Salkilld	August 8, 2026	
UFC Vegas 119	UFC Fight Night: Kape vs. Horiguchi	June 20, 2026	
UFC Vegas 118	UFC Fight Night: Muhammad vs. Bonfim	June 6, 2026	
UFC Vegas 117	UFC Fight Night: Allen vs. Costa	May 16, 2026	
UFC Vegas 116	UFC Fight Night: Sterling vs. Zalal	April 25, 2026	
UFC Vegas 115	UFC Fight Night: Moicano vs. Duncan	April 4, 2026	
UFC Vegas 114	UFC Fight Night: Emmett vs. Vallejos	March 14, 2026	
UFC Vegas 113	UFC Fight Night: Bautista vs. Oliveira	February 7, 2026	
UFC Vegas 112	UFC on ESPN: Royval vs. Kape	December 13, 2025	
UFC Vegas 111	UFC Fight Night: Bonfim vs. Brown	November 8, 2025	
UFC Vegas 110	UFC Fight Night: Garcia vs. Onama	November 1, 2025	
UFC Vegas 109	UFC Fight Night: Dolidze vs. Hernandez	August 9, 2025	
UFC Vegas 108	UFC on ESPN: Taira vs. Park	August 2, 2025	
UFC Vegas 107	UFC on ESPN: Gamrot vs. Klein	May 31, 2025	
UFC Vegas 106	UFC Fight Night: Burns vs. Morales	May 17, 2025	
UFC Vegas 105	UFC on ESPN: Emmett vs. Murphy	April 5, 2025	
UFC Vegas 104	UFC Fight Night: Vettori vs. Dolidze 2	March 15, 2025	
UFC Vegas 103	UFC Fight Night: Kape vs. Almabayev	March 1, 2025	
UFC Vegas 102	UFC Fight Night: Cannonier vs. Rodrigues	February 15, 2025	
UFC Vegas 101	UFC Fight Night: Dern vs. Ribas 2	January 11, 2025	
UFC Vegas 100	UFC Fight Night: Magny vs. Prates	November 9, 2024	
UFC Vegas 99	UFC Fight Night: Hernandez vs. Pereira	October 19, 2024	
UFC Vegas 98	UFC Fight Night: Royval vs. Taira	October 12, 2024	
UFC Vegas 97	UFC Fight Night: Burns vs. Brady	September 7, 2024	
UFC Vegas 96	UFC on ESPN: Cannonier vs. Borralho	August 24, 2024	
UFC Vegas 95	UFC on ESPN: Tybura vs. Spivac 2	August 10, 2024	
UFC Vegas 94	UFC on ESPN: Lemos vs. Jandiroba	July 20, 2024	
UFC Vegas 93	UFC on ESPN: Perez vs. Taira	June 15, 2024	
UFC Vegas 92	UFC Fight Night: Barboza vs. Murphy	May 18, 2024	
UFC Vegas 91	UFC on ESPN: Nicolau vs. Perez	April 27, 2024	
UFC Vegas 90	UFC Fight Night: Allen vs. Curtis 2	April 6, 2024	
UFC Vegas 89	UFC on ESPN: Ribas vs. Namajunas	March 23, 2024	
UFC Vegas 88	UFC Fight Night: Tuivasa vs. Tybura	March 16, 2024	
UFC Vegas 87	UFC Fight Night: Rozenstruik vs. Gaziev	March 2, 2024	
UFC Vegas 86	UFC Fight Night: Hermansson vs. Pyfer	February 10, 2024	
UFC Vegas 85	UFC Fight Night: Dolidze vs. Imavov	February 3, 2024	
UFC Vegas 84	UFC Fight Night: Ankalaev vs. Walker 2	January 13, 2024	
UFC Vegas 83	UFC Fight Night: Song vs. Gutiérrez	December 9, 2023	
UFC Vegas 82	UFC Fight Night: Allen vs. Craig	November 18, 2023	
UFC Vegas 81	UFC Fight Night: Yusuff vs. Barboza	October 14, 2023	
UFC Vegas 80	UFC Fight Night: Dawson vs. Green	October 7, 2023	
UFC Vegas 79	UFC Fight Night: Fiziev vs. Gamrot	September 23, 2023	
UFC Vegas 78	UFC on ESPN: Luque vs. dos Anjos	August 12, 2023	
UFC Vegas 77	UFC on ESPN: Holm vs. Bueno Silva	July 15, 2023	
UFC Vegas 76	UFC on ESPN: Strickland vs. Magomedov	July 1, 2023	
UFC Vegas 75	UFC on ESPN: Vettori vs. Cannonier	June 17, 2023	
UFC Vegas 74	UFC on ESPN: Kara-France vs. Albazi	June 3, 2023	
UFC Vegas 73	UFC Fight Night: Dern vs. Hill	May 20, 2023	
UFC Vegas 72	UFC Fight Night: Song vs. Simón	April 29, 2023	
UFC Vegas 71	UFC Fight Night: Pavlovich vs. Blaydes	April 22, 2023	
UFC Vegas 70	UFC Fight Night: Muniz vs. Allen	February 25, 2023	
UFC Vegas 69	UFC Fight Night: Andrade vs. Blanchfield	February 18, 2023	
UFC Vegas 68	UFC Fight Night: Lewis vs. Spivak	February 4, 2023	
UFC Vegas 67	UFC Fight Night: Strickland vs. Imavov	January 14, 2023	
UFC Vegas 66	UFC Fight Night: Cannonier vs. Strickland	December 17, 2022	
UFC Vegas 65	UFC Fight Night: Nzechukwu vs. Cuțelaba	November 19, 2022	
UFC Vegas 64	UFC Fight Night: Rodriguez vs. Lemos	November 5, 2022	
UFC Vegas 63	UFC Fight Night: Kattar vs. Allen	October 29, 2022	
UFC Vegas 62	UFC Fight Night: Grasso vs. Araújo	October 15, 2022	
UFC Vegas 61	UFC Fight Night: Dern vs. Yan	October 1, 2022	
UFC Vegas 60	UFC Fight Night: Sandhagen vs. Song	September 17, 2022	
UFC Vegas 59	UFC on ESPN: Santos vs. Hill	August 6, 2022	
UFC Vegas 58	UFC on ESPN: dos Anjos vs. Fiziev	July 9, 2022	
UFC Vegas 57	UFC on ESPN: Tsarukyan vs. Gamrot	June 25, 2022	
UFC Vegas 56	UFC Fight Night: Volkov vs. Rozenstruik	June 4, 2022	
UFC Vegas 55	UFC Fight Night: Holm vs. Vieira	May 21, 2022	
UFC Vegas 54	UFC on ESPN: Błachowicz vs. Rakić	May 14, 2022	
UFC Vegas 53	UFC on ESPN: Font vs. Vera	April 30, 2022	
UFC Vegas 52	UFC Fight Night: Lemos vs. Andrade	April 23, 2022	
UFC Vegas 51	UFC on ESPN: Luque vs. Muhammad 2	April 16, 2022	
UFC Vegas 50	UFC Fight Night: Santos vs. Ankalaev	March 12, 2022	
UFC Vegas 49	UFC Fight Night: Makhachev vs. Green	February 26, 2022	
UFC Vegas 48	UFC Fight Night: Walker vs. Hill	February 19, 2022	
UFC Vegas 47	UFC Fight Night: Hermansson vs. Strickland	February 5, 2022	
UFC Vegas 46	UFC on ESPN: Kattar vs. Chikadze	January 15, 2022	
UFC Vegas 45	UFC Fight Night: Lewis vs. Daukaus	December 18, 2021	
UFC Vegas 44	UFC on ESPN: Font vs. Aldo	December 4, 2021	
UFC Vegas 43	UFC Fight Night: Vieira vs. Tate	November 20, 2021	
UFC Vegas 42	UFC Fight Night: Holloway vs. Rodríguez	November 13, 2021	
UFC Vegas 41	UFC Fight Night: Costa vs. Vettori	October 23, 2021	
UFC Vegas 40	UFC Fight Night: Ladd vs. Dumont	October 16, 2021	
UFC Vegas 39	UFC Fight Night: Dern vs. Rodriguez	October 9, 2021	
UFC Vegas 38	UFC Fight Night: Santos vs. Walker	October 2, 2021	
UFC Vegas 37	UFC Fight Night: Smith vs. Spann	September 18, 2021	
UFC Vegas 36	UFC Fight Night: Brunson vs. Till	September 4, 2021	
UFC Vegas 35	UFC on ESPN: Barboza vs. Chikadze	August 28, 2021	
UFC Vegas 34	UFC on ESPN: Cannonier vs. Gastelum	August 21, 2021	
UFC Vegas 33	UFC on ESPN: Hall vs. Strickland	July 31, 2021	
UFC Vegas 32	UFC on ESPN: Sandhagen vs. Dillashaw	July 24, 2021	
UFC Vegas 31	UFC on ESPN: Makhachev vs. Moisés	July 17, 2021	
UFC Vegas 30	UFC Fight Night: Gane vs. Volkov	June 26, 2021	
UFC Vegas 29	UFC on ESPN: The Korean Zombie vs. Ige	June 19, 2021	
UFC Vegas 28	UFC Fight Night: Rozenstruik vs. Sakai	June 5, 2021	
UFC Vegas 27	UFC Fight Night: Font vs. Garbrandt	May 22, 2021	
UFC Vegas 26	UFC on ESPN: Rodriguez vs. Waterson	May 8, 2021	
UFC Vegas 25	UFC on ESPN: Reyes vs. Procházka	May 1, 2021	
UFC Vegas 24	UFC on ESPN: Whittaker vs. Gastelum	Apr 17, 2021	
UFC Vegas 23	UFC on ABC: Vettori vs. Holland	Apr 10, 2021	
UFC 260	UFC 260: Miocic vs Ngannou 2	Mar 27, 2021	
UFC Vegas 22	UFC on ESPN: Brunson vs. Holland	Mar 20, 2021	
UFC Vegas 21	UFC Fight Night: Edwards vs. Muhammad	Mar 13, 2021	
UFC 259	UFC 259: Błachowicz vs. Adesanya	Mar 6, 2021	
UFC Vegas 20	UFC Fight Night: Rozenstruik vs. Gane	Feb 27, 2021	
UFC Vegas 19	UFC Fight Night: Blaydes vs. Lewis	Feb 20, 2021	
UFC 258	UFC 258: Usman vs. Burns	Feb 13, 2021	
UFC Vegas 18	UFC Fight Night: Overeem vs. Volkov	Feb 6, 2021	
UFC Vegas 17	UFC Fight Night: Thompson vs. Neal	Dec 19, 2020	
UFC 256	UFC 256: Figueiredo vs. Moreno	Dec 12, 2020	
UFC Vegas 16	UFC on ESPN: Hermansson vs. Vettori	Dec 5, 2020	
UFC Vegas 15	UFC on ESPN: Smith vs. Clark	Nov 28, 2020	
UFC 255	UFC 255: Figueiredo vs. Perez	Nov 21, 2020	
UFC Vegas 14	UFC Fight Night: Felder vs. dos Anjos	Nov 14, 2020	
UFC Vegas 13	UFC Fight Night: Santos vs. Teixeira	Nov 7, 2020	
UFC Vegas 12	UFC Fight Night: Hall vs. Silva	Oct 31, 2020	
UFC Vegas 11	UFC Fight Night: Covington vs. Woodley	Sep 19, 2020	
UFC Vegas 10	UFC Fight Night: Waterson vs. Hill	Sep 12, 2020	
UFC Vegas 9	UFC Fight Night: Overeem vs. Sakai	Sep 5, 2020	
UFC Vegas 8	UFC Fight Night: Smith vs. Rakić	Aug 29, 2020	
UFC Vegas 7	UFC on ESPN: Munhoz vs. Edgar	Aug 22, 2020	
UFC 252	UFC 252: Miocic vs. Cormier 3	Aug 15, 2020	
UFC Vegas 6	UFC Fight Night: Lewis vs. Oleinik	Aug 8, 2020	
UFC Vegas 5	UFC Fight Night: Brunson vs. Shahbazyan	Aug 1, 2020	
UFC Vegas 4	UFC on ESPN: Poirier vs. Hooker	Jun 27, 2020	
UFC Vegas 3	UFC on ESPN: Blaydes vs. Volkov	Jun 20, 2020	
UFC Vegas 2	UFC on ESPN: Eye vs. Calvillo	Jun 13, 2020	
UFC 250	UFC 250: Nunes vs. Spencer	Jun 6, 2020	
UFC Vegas 1	UFC on ESPN: Woodley vs. Burns	May 30, 2020	

=== Submission grappling events ===
Title	Event	Date	Ref
UFC BJJ 9	UFC BJJ 9: Fowler vs. Johnson	June 4, 2026	
UFC BJJ 8	UFC BJJ 8: Musumeci vs. Dantzler	May 21, 2026	
UFC BJJ 7	UFC BJJ 5: Tackett vs. Rocha	April 2, 2026	
UFC BJJ 6	UFC BJJ 5: Fowler vs. Machado	March 12, 2026	
UFC BJJ 5	UFC BJJ 5: Musumeci vs. Montague	February 12, 2026	
UFC BJJ 4	UFC BJJ 4: Tackett vs. Dorsey	December 11, 2025	
UFC BJJ 3	UFC BJJ 3: Musumeci vs. Carrasco	October 2, 2025	
UFC BJJ 2	UFC BJJ 2: Tackett vs. Canuto	July 31, 2025	
UFC BJJ 1	UFC BJJ 1: Musumeci vs. Gabriel	June 25, 2025	
UFC FPI 11	UFC Fight Pass Invitational 11	May 29, 2025	
UFC FPI 10	UFC Fight Pass Invitational 10	March 6, 2025	
UFC FPI 9	UFC Fight Pass Invitational 9	December 5, 2024	
UFC FPI 8	UFC Fight Pass Invitational 8	October 10, 2024	
UFC FPI 7	UFC Fight Pass Invitational 7	May 15, 2024	
UFC FPI 6	UFC Fight Pass Invitational 6	March 3, 2024	
UFC FPI 5	UFC Fight Pass Invitational 5	December 10, 2023	
UFC FPI 4	UFC Fight Pass Invitational 4	June 29, 2023	
UFC FPI 3	UFC Fight Pass Invitational 3	December 15, 2022	
UFC FPI 2	UFC Fight Pass Invitational 2	July 3, 2022	
UFC FPI 1	UFC Fight Pass Invitational 1	December 16, 2021	

=== Power Slap events ===
Title	Event	Date	Ref
Power Slap 7	Power Slap 7: The Bell vs. Phillips	April 12, 2024	
Power Slap 5	Power Slap 5: Da Crazy Hawaiian vs. Vakameilalo	October 25, 2023	
Power Slap 4	Power Slap 4: Hintz vs. Turpin	August 9, 2023	
Power Slap 3	Power Slap 3: Hintz vs. Wolverine	July 7, 2023	
Power Slap 2	Power Slap 2: Wolverine vs. The Bell	May 24, 2023	
Power Slap 1	Power Slap 1: Darius the Destroyer vs. Wolverine	March 11, 2023	

=== WWE events ===
Title	Event	Date	Ref
NXT Battleground	NXT Battleground (2024)	June 9, 2024	

=== Zuffa Boxing events ===
Title	Event	Date	Ref
Z04	Zuffa Boxing 04: Jai Opetaia vs. Brandon Glanton	March 8, 2026	
Z03	Zuffa Boxing 03: Efe Ajagba vs. Charles Martin	February 15, 2026	
Z02	Zuffa Boxing 02: José Valenzuela vs. Diego Torres	February 1, 2026	
Z01	Zuffa Boxing 01: Callum Walsh vs. Carlos Ocampo	January 23, 2026	

=== Street League Skateboarding events ===
Event	Date	Ref
SLS Championship Tour	October 8, 2022	
SLS Championship Tour	October 9, 2022	
SLS Apex 01	March 30, 2024	
SLS Apex 02	May 25, 2024	

== See also ==
- UFC Performance Institute
- WWE Performance Center
