= Brazilian jiu-jitsu ranking system =

Colored belts signifying skill level

The Brazilian jiu-jitsu ranking system signifies a practitioner's increasing level of technical knowledge and practical skill within the art. Colored belts worn as part of the uniform are awarded to the practitioner. The ranking system shares its origins with the judo belt-rank system, but the Brazilian system incorporates some minor differences from Judo such as a division between youths and adults and the issuance of stripes and degrees. Some differences have become synonymous with the art, such as a marked informality in promotional criteria, a focus on competitive demonstration of skill, and conservative promotion.

== History ==
In 1907, Kanō Jigorō, the founder of judo, introduced the use of belts (obi) and gi (judogi) in the martial arts, replacing the practice of training in formal kimono. In 1914, Kanō's pupil Mitsuyo Maeda arrived in Brazil, a journey which led to the development of Brazilian jiu-jitsu. At the time, Kanō used only white and black belts.

Some believe that Mikonosuke Kawaishi was the first to introduce additional colors in 1935 when he began teaching Judo in Paris, ten years after Carlos Gracie opened his academy in Brazil. Kawaishi thought that a more structured system of colored belts would provide the student with visible rewards to show progress, increasing motivation and retention. However, written accounts from the archives of London's Budokwai judo club, founded in 1918, record the use of colored judo belts at the 1926 9th annual Budokwai Display, and a list of color-ranked judokas appears in the Budokwai Committee Minutes of June 1927. Kawaishi may have arrived in the UK by 1928, and appears to have first visited London and the Budokwai in 1931. From there he was probably inspired to bring the colored belt system to France. Since then, Brazilian jiu-jitsu, judo, and many other martial arts have adopted the use of colored belts to denote students' progression in the arts.

The first official belt ranking system was created in 1967 by the Jiu-Jitsu Federation of Guanabara. Before those days, there were three belt colors in Brazilian jiu-jitsu that primarily distinguished instructors from students. The white belt was for students, light blue for instructors, and dark blue for masters. The Sport Jiu Jitsu International Federation (SJJIF) and International Brazilian Jiu-Jitsu Federation implemented much of the current criteria and modern belt ranks.

== Adult belt ranks ==
Adult belt colors (16 and older)
| White | |
| Yellow (select dojos) | |
| Orange (select dojos) | |
| Green (select dojos) | |
| Blue | |
| Purple | |
| Brown | |
| Black 0–6 | | |
| Coral 7 | |
| Coral 8 | | |
| Red 9–10 | |

White borders on the ends of the bar signify a fully certified instructor.

=== White belt ===
A white belt is the beginning rank for all Brazilian jiu-jitsu students. The rank is held by any practitioner new to the art and has no prerequisite. Some instructors and other high-level practitioners think that a white belt's training should emphasize escapes and defensive positioning since a white belt will often fight from inferior positions, especially when training with more experienced practitioners.

Most academies will additionally require that a white belt level practitioner works to obtain a well-rounded skills set, with a knowledge of basic offensive moves, such as common submissions and guard passes.

=== Blue belt ===
Blue belt is the second adult rank in Brazilian jiu-jitsu at schools that do not use yellow, orange, and green belts for adults. At the blue belt level, students gain a wide breadth of technical knowledge and undertake hundreds of hours of mat time to learn how to implement these moves efficiently. Blue belt is often the rank at which the student learns a large number of techniques. The IBJJF requires a practitioner remain a blue belt for a minimum of two years before progressing to purple. As of 2022, the IBJJF allows coaches to ignore this minimum time-requirement if the practitioner has won an adult world championship at blue belt.

Although many Brazilian Jiu-Jitsu (BJJ) organizations adhere to the International Brazilian Jiu-Jitsu Federation (IBJJF) standard of awarding the yellow, orange, and green belts exclusively as part of the youth belt system (under 16 years of age), some supplement the time between white belt and blue belt with one or more of these belts as intermediate ranks for adult practitioners as well. On the other hand, Gracie jiu-jitsu organizations award these belts strictly to youth, in the same manner as the BJJ grey belt, and award the Gracie Combatives belt as their only intermediary adult rank between white belt and blue belt.

The IBJJF requires that a practitioner be at least 16 years old to receive a blue belt, thereby officially entering into the adult belt system.

=== Purple belt ===
Purple belt is the intermediate adult ranking in Brazilian jiu-jitsu. The purple belt level practitioner has gained a large amount of knowledge and purple belts are generally considered qualified to help instruct lower-ranked students.

The IBJJF requires students to be at least 16 years old and recommends they have spent a minimum of two years ranked as a blue belt to be eligible for a purple belt, with slightly different requirements for those graduating directly from the youth belts. The IBJJF requires a practitioner remain a purple belt for a minimum of 18 months prior to achieving a brown belt. As of 2022, the IBJJF allows coaches to ignore this minimum time-requirement if the practitioner has won an adult world championship at purple belt.

=== Brown belt ===
Brown belt is the highest ranking color belt below black belt in Brazilian jiu-jitsu. Progressing from a beginner white belt through to a brown belt typically requires at least eight years of dedicated training. It is often thought of as a time for refining techniques.

The IBJJF requires that students be at least 18 years old and recommends they have spent a minimum of 18 months as a purple belt to be eligible for a brown belt. The IBJJF requires a practitioner to train at the brown belt level for a minimum of one year before ascending to black belt. As of 2022, the IBJJF allows coaches to ignore this minimum time-requirement if the practitioner has won an adult world championship at brown belt.

=== Black belt ===
In Brazilian jiu-jitsu, the black belt denotes an expert level of technical and practical skill. BJJ black belts are often addressed within the art as "professor" or "coach", although some schools and organizations reserve these title for the more senior black belt instructors. To be eligible for a black belt, the IBJJF requires that a student be at least 19 years old and to have spent a minimum of a year as a brown belt. The black belt itself has nine different degrees of expertise, similar to the dan in traditional Japanese martial arts, with rankings at seventh degree and eighth degree commonly denoted by a coral belt, and the ninth degree represented with a red belt. The IBJJF requires a practitioner to practice and teach at the black belt level for a minimum of three years before progressing to the next rank for the first 3 ranks. Ranks 4, 5, and 6 require 5 years from the previous rank. As with most things in jiu-jitsu, there is no standardization from one academy or organization to another. This is also true for the black belt, as there is no set guidance from the IBJJF related to variations of the belt. However, there are three common variations of a black belt, each of which has its own general meaning: a black belt with a white bar generally indicates a common practitioner or competitor, while a black belt with a red bar is the standard black belt (but sometimes differentiates a coach from a professor) and can often signify a coach, and a red bar with white borders on both ends sometimes comes after at least a year or more of teaching as a black belt and signifies a professor. Royce Gracie and the Valente brothers started a black belt with a blue bar to honor the legacy of Hélio Gracie, but this has not been widely adopted. Royce Gracie now wears a navy blue belt without rank insignia following the death of his father.

=== Red / Black belt (Coral belt) ===
When a Brazilian jiu-jitsu black belt reaches the seventh degree, they are awarded an alternating red-and-black belt similar to the one awarded fourth degree black belt by very few judo bodies such as the USJA. This belt is commonly known as a coral belt, after the coral snake. Coral belts are very experienced practitioners, most of whom have made a large impact on Brazilian jiu-jitsu, and are often addressed within the art by the title master. The IBJJF requires a minimum of 7 years of training and teaching at the black and red belt level before progressing to the next rank.

=== Red / White belt (Coral belt) ===
The International Brazilian jiu-jitsu Federation in 2013 amended the graduation guidelines with respect to the transition between seventh degree and eighth degree black belt. In short, a practitioner who has achieved the rank of 8th degree black belt will wear a red and white belt similar to the one worn on formal occasions by sixth to eighth degree holders in judo which is also commonly called a coral belt. The IBJJF requires a minimum of 10 years of teaching and training at the red and white belt level before progressing to the next rank.

=== Red belt ===
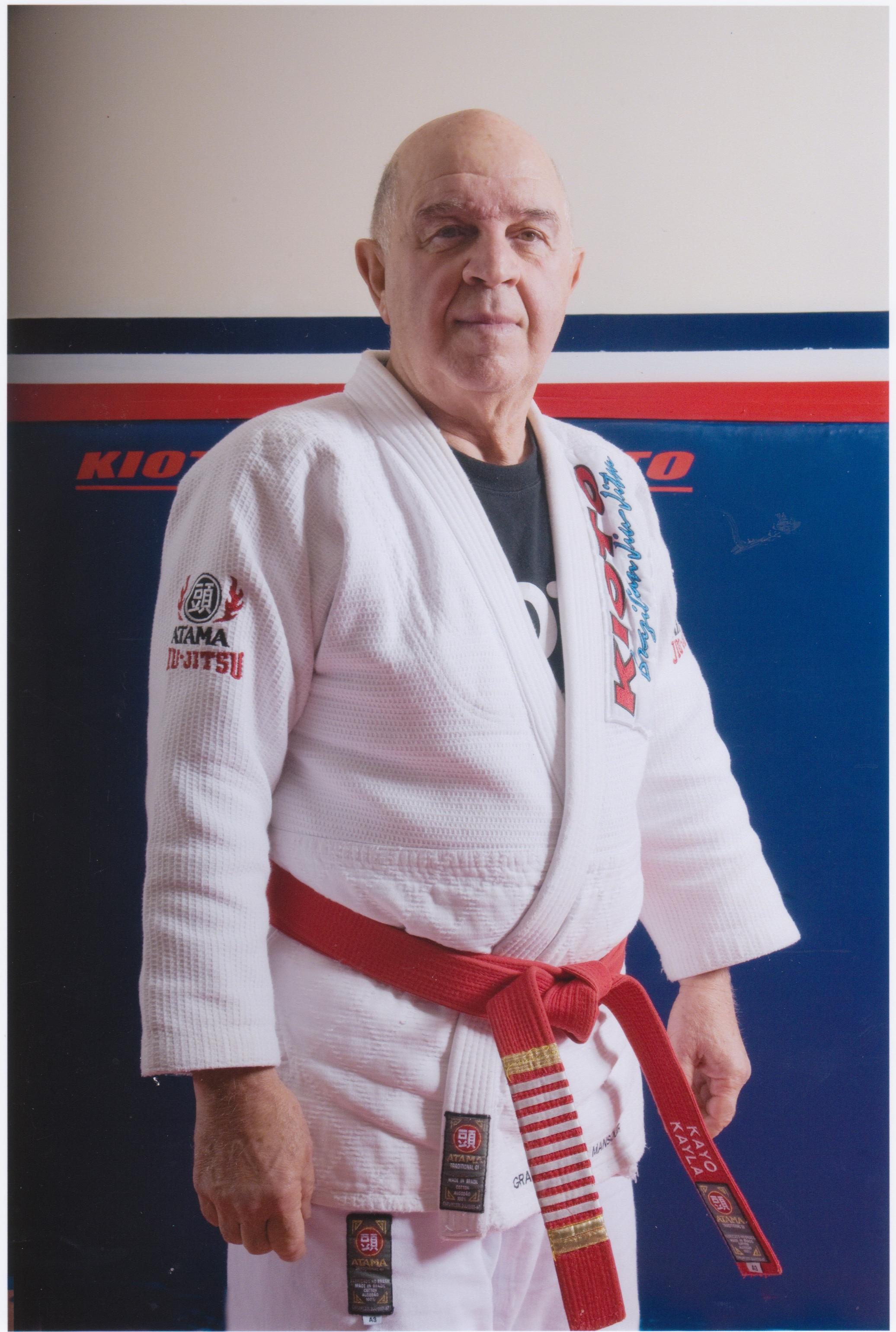
Francisco Mansor wears his 9th degree red belt.

According to Renzo and Royler Gracie, in Brazilian jiu-jitsu the red belt is reserved "for those whose influence and fame takes them to the pinnacle of art". It is awarded in lieu of a ninth and tenth degree black belt. If a practitioner receives his or her black belt at 19 years old, the earliest they could expect to receive a ninth degree red belt would be at the age of 67. Brazilian jiu-jitsu red belt holders are often addressed within the art by the title grandmaster. The 10th degree was given only to the pioneers of Brazilian Jiu-Jitsu, and the Gracie brothers: Carlos, Oswaldo, Gastão Jr, George, and Hélio. The highest ranking living practitioners are 9th degree red belts, as there are no living 10th degree red belts.

== Youth belt ranks ==
Depending on the dojo, juniors, or children between 4 and 15 years old can receive both regular, and unlike adult ranks, striped belt colors that are rewarded for progress after white belt, but before earning blue belt, which can only be awarded to seniors, or people 16 years or older. In 2015, the International Brazilian Jiu-Jitsu Federation specified 13 belts for youth practitioners within these ages. The group of three gray belts have an age requirement beginning at age 4, along with the group of three yellow belts beginning at age 7, The group of orange belts beginning at age 10, and the group of green belts beginning at age 13.

When a practitioner turns 16, they are immediately promoted to the adult ranking system according to the belt they have at the time. Beginners remain at white belt, and gray, yellow, or orange belts either revert to white or can be promoted to blue belt at the professor's discretion. Also at the professor's discretion, green belts revert to white or can be promoted to blue or purple belt.

Youth belt colors (under 16)
| White |
| Gray-White |
| Gray |
| Gray-Black |
| Yellow-White |
| Yellow |
| Yellow-Black |
| Orange-White |
| Orange |
| Orange-Black |
| Green-White |
| Green |
| Green-Black |

== Conversion between youth belt systems ==
The table below shows an approximate conversion between the Gracie system and the International Brazilian Jiu-Jitsu Federation system, including striped sub-ranking within each belt. These are the two most common systems for kids belts in Brazilian jiu-jitsu. Both systems span practitioners from 4 years old through 15 years old.

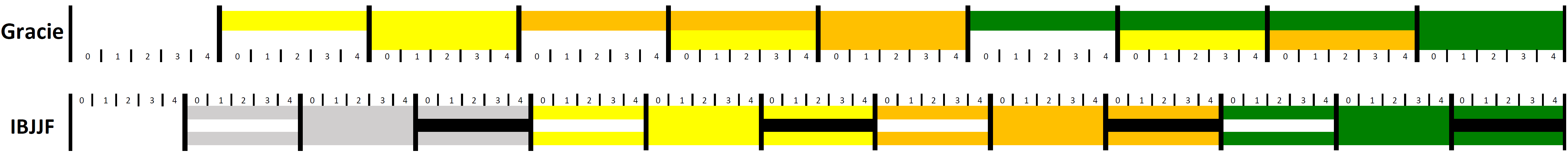
Youth belt approximate conversion.

== Promotion criteria ==
Few published guidelines or standards determine when a practitioner is ready for a promotion; the criterion is generally determined by individual instructors and/or academies. The IBJJF maintains an extensive graduation system that takes into account time-in-grade and membership standing, but makes no mention of specific performance or skill requirements. When instructors or academies comment on the criteria for promotion, the most widely accepted measures are the amount of technical and conceptual knowledge a practitioner can demonstrate, and; performance in grappling (randori) within the academy and/or competition.

Technical and conceptual knowledge are judged by the number of techniques a student can perform and the level of skill with which they are performed in live grappling, allowing smaller and older practitioners to be recognized for their knowledge, although they may not be the strongest fighters in the school. Brazilian jiu-jitsu is a distinctly individual sport, and practitioners are encouraged to adapt the techniques to their body type, strategic preferences, and level of athleticism. The ultimate criterion for promotion is the ability to execute the techniques successfully, rather than strict stylistic compliance.

=== Formal testing ===
Brazilian jiu-jitsu has had an informal approach to belt promotions, in which one or more instructors subjectively agree that a given student is ready for the next rank. Some academies have moved toward a more systematic, formal testing approach, especially true for lower ranked students, where the decision to promote is arguably the least contentious. One of the first instructors to publicly publish formal testing criteria was Roy Harris, who has formalized his promotion tests from white belt to black belt. Formal testing is now becoming commonplace in many Gracie Academies and organizations such as Alliance.

Some Gracie systems have introduced formal online testing where the student can upload his or her qualification videos to qualify for promotion. Formal tests are generally based around the same elements as a normal promotion, such as the student's technical and conceptual knowledge and the ability to apply those techniques against a resisting opponent. Some tests take other aspects, such as a student's personal character or a basic knowledge of the history of the art, into account. Formal testing may require the payment of testing fees and require a minimum of pre-testing private lessons with the instructor.

=== Competitions ===
Students are generally encouraged to compete, as this can help them gain experience. Competition allows instructors to gauge students' abilities while grappling with a fully resisting opponent, and it is common for a promotion to follow a good competition performance. In most academies, competing is not essential for promotion, but in a minority of schools, competing is not only endorsed but is required.

== Stripe degrees ==
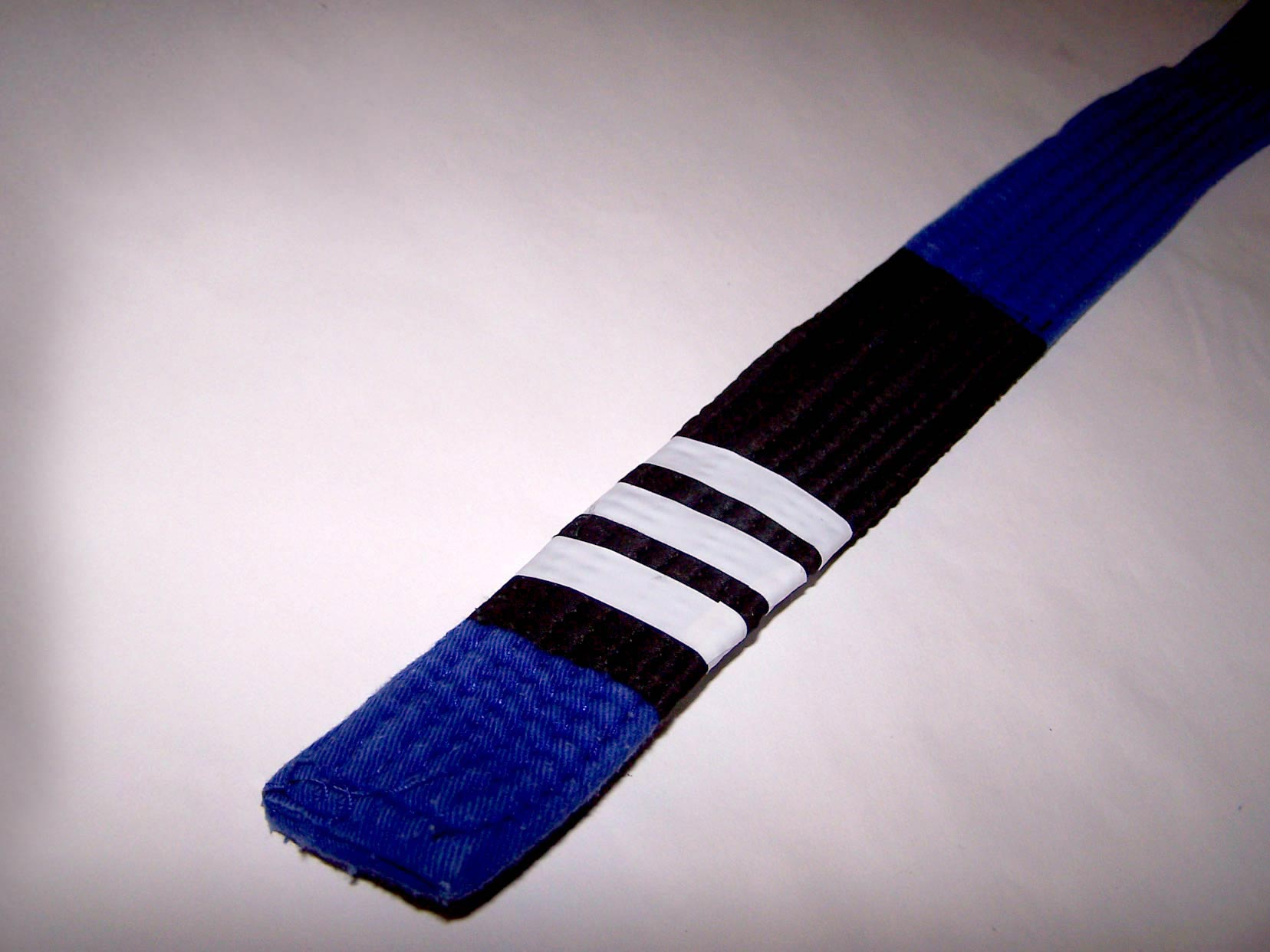
A blue belt with three stripes out of a max four.

In addition to the belt system, many academies award stripes as a form of intra-belt recognition of progress and skill. Within each of the belts, students have the opportunity to earn up to generally 4 stripes on their belt, indicating progress within that belt. The cumulative number of stripes earned serves as an indication of the student's skill level relative to the total curriculum of that belt color. Stripes may consist of small pieces of cloth sewn onto the sleeve of the belt, or simple pieces of athletic tape applied to it. Although the exact application, such as the number of stripes allowed for each belt, varies between institutions, the IBJJF sets out a general system under which four stripes can be added before the student may be considered for promotion to the next belt rank. Stripes are only used for ranks prior to black belt. After black belt is achieved, the markings are known as degrees and are awarded more formally and far less frequently. Time-in-grade and skill level are both important factors. Stripes may not be used in every academy, and where they are used, they may not be applied consistently.

== Passar no corredor ==
In some schools running the gauntlet ("passar no corredor" in Portuguese) is practiced immediately after a promotion. This generally follows one of two basic patterns. The newly promoted student is hit on their back with belts—once by each of their fellow practitioners—as he or she walks or runs past ("faixada" in Portuguese), or he or she may be thrown by each instructor and sometimes also by each student in the academy of equal or higher grade. Advocates for the custom argue that "running the gauntlet" serves as a method of team building and reinforces camaraderie between classmates.

Other initiation customs may involve being hip thrown by the instructor.

== See also ==
- Gracie jiu-jitsu ranking system
- List of Brazilian jiu-jitsu practitioners
- Jiu-Jitsu Federation of Rio de Janeiro
- Rank in Judo
- Black Belt
- Sandbagging (grappling)
