= Gracie jiu-jitsu ranking system =

Martial arts ranking system developed by Carlos and Hélio Gracie

The Gracie jiu-jitsu ranking system is a method of signifying competency and moral character of a jiu-jitsu practitioner, developed by founders Carlos and Hélio Gracie, and utilized by members of the Gracie family.

Similar to the IBJJF Brazilian jiu-jitsu ranking system, the Gracie system has a number of key differences. Most notable is the half-color ranks included in the junior level, making for a larger series of ranks for practitioners under the age of 16 years old.

== Bars and stripes / degrees ==
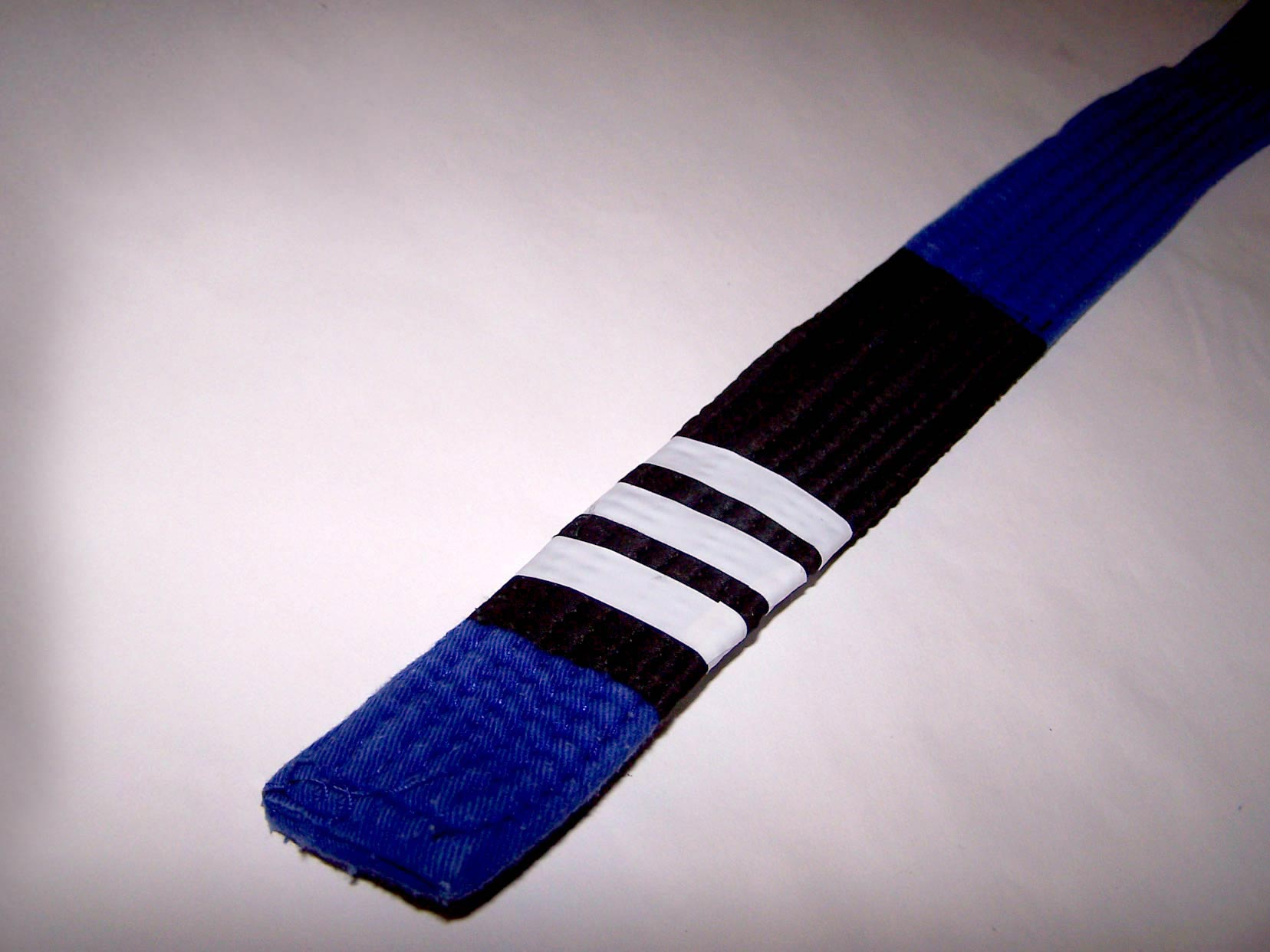
A jiu-jitsu blue belt with three stripes.

Having its roots in the Japanese martial art and sport of judo, Gracie/Brazilian jiu-jitsu adopted a similar colored belt system to signify a practitioner's progression within the art. However, to differentiate Brazilian jiu-jitsu from the other disciplines, a solid bar was included on the belt near one of the ends.

As a practitioner advances, stripes are awarded and placed at equidistant intervals on the solid bar—which is colored black for most belt ranks—as intermediate signifiers between belt ranks. Generally a student will receive four stripes before advancing to the next full rank, but it is not uncommon for a practitioner to be promoted to a new belt without being awarded all four stripes of the previous rank.

For most belt ranks, and most Gracie schools, each stripe is awarded at the discretion of the instructor, without any specific curriculum or qualification requirements. However, with adult ranks, (particularly the lower colors of blue and purple), proficiency in a set series of techniques may be required prior to consideration for stripe promotion. The Gracie Jiu-Jitsu Academy of Torrance, California (founded by Rorion and his brothers Rickson, Royler, and Royce, and now run by Rorion's sons Rener and Ryron), features an online program called Gracie University (GU) for satellite students who cannot attend live classes. For GU students, not only is there a defined set of techniques to demonstrate proficiency in, but a student is required to test their skills and be graded by the headquarters instructors for a minimum level of competency before being awarded a particular stripe. For live class students, the academy requires a minimum amount of class hours attended, as well as overall time as a student before consideration for a stripe.

== Adult belt ranks ==
Adult belt colors (16 and older)
White	
Blue	
Purple	
Brown	
Black 0–6	|
Coral 7	
Coral 8	|
Red 9–10	

White borders on the ends of the bar signify a fully certified instructor.

After turning 16 years old, a student is eligible to advance to the adult ranks, beginning with blue belt. As with the junior system, stripes are generally awarded signifying progression toward the next rank. However, in the adult ranks, promotions occur much less frequently than in the junior ages. Beginning with blue belt, a student will typically spend at least 2 years at each full rank before advancing to the next belt. The minimum age required for attaining a black belt is 18 years.

Beginning with black belt, each stripe earned is referred to as a "degree" (e.g. "2nd-degree black belt"), and typically requires a minimum of 3 years of teaching experience before consideration.

However, a practitioner may begin teaching at a blue belt rank or higher, and instruct students of a lower rank. Requirements for teaching generally include demonstration of proficiency in knowledge and technique, as well as completion of a probationary teaching period. Upon successful completion of full instructor requirements, a white border is added on each end of the solid bar on the individual's belt (regardless of color), signifying a fully certified instructor. The black belt for a non-instructor features a solid white bar (as opposed to the typical black bar found on the lower ranks). It is only when a black belt-level practitioner is in the process of becoming a professor and is teaching students, that this white bar is replaced with a red bar. Upon reaching the 2nd-degree of black belt, an instructor is commonly referred to as "professor."

Once a practitioner advances beyond the 6th degree of black belt, an alternating red and black belt is awarded, along with the title of master. This belt is often referred to as a "coral belt" (after the color scheme of the coral snake), and is used to designate 7th degree black belt practitioners. Among international federations (most notably the IBJJF), the 8th degree of black belt is designated with an alternating red and white coral belt. As founder of the IBJJF, and 8th degree practitioner himself, Carlos Gracie Jr. wears this belt. Practitioners from the Hélio Gracie lineage however, maintain the red and black coral belt and simply add an additional stripe. Prior to their promotions, Rickson Gracie and Joe Moreira were notable examples of this. Pedro Sauer also maintains a red and black belt as an eighth degree rank.

Beyond 8th degree, the 9th and 10th degrees are signified with solid red belts. Noted practitioners Renzo & Royler Gracie have stated that the red belt in Gracie/Brazilian jiu-jitsu is reserved "for those whose influence and fame takes them to the pinnacle of the art". Red belt holders are often addressed within the art by the title grandmaster.

The 10th degree has been given only to the pioneers of the art, being awarded to senior Gracie brothers: Carlos, Oswaldo, George, Gastão and Hélio, and to three additional masters, Luiz França, Oswaldo Fadda and Francisco Sá.

=== Unique belts ===
In some instances, practitioners within the Gracie system will wear belts not recognized or utilized within the greater jiu-jitsu community. Some notable black belt level practitioners, including Royce Gracie and the Valente brothers, have transitioned to wearing a dark navy blue belt in deference to the historical tradition prior to the colored belt ranking system, (a white belt designated a student, a light blue belt designated an instructor, and head professors wore a dark navy belt). For a period of time, this was the system held by Helio Gracie. Royce in particular gave his reasoning in a live interview, stating that he has only ever been promoted by his father Helio, and after his father's death, he has no interest in being promoted by anyone else. Therefore, he followed his father's example and began wearing a dark navy belt.

Specialty belts
Navy (Professor)
White and Navy (Combatives)
Pink (Women Empowered Graduate)

For individuals who begin training as adults (automatically bypassing junior grade levels), the Gracie Jiu-Jitsu Academy and its Certified Training Centers around the world award a white belt with a navy blue center to students who are promoted from the solid white (beginner) rank. This belt is called the "Combatives belt" in reference to the Gracie Combatives program, which serves as the foundation for all beginner students. This belt was introduced as an intermediary rank for students who complete the beginner curriculum, but still lack the level of experience commonly attributed to blue belt practitioners, instead of yellow, orange and green belts, as in Brazilian Jiu-Jitsu. Also compared to BJJ, these belts are awarded strictly to youth practitioners.

The Academy also introduced a pink belt for graduates of their Women Empowered self-defense program, a curriculum featuring a limited set of jiu-jitsu techniques specifically curated to defend against common sexual assault scenarios.

== Junior belt ranks ==
Junior belt colors (under 16)
White
White-Yellow
Yellow
White-Orange
Yellow-Orange
Orange
White-Green
Yellow-Green
Orange-Green
Green

When the Jiu-Jitsu Federation of Guanabara was created in 1967, it adopted the judo colored belt system developed thirty years prior by Mikonosuke Kawaishi and forty years prior by the London Budokwai, but instituted a separation between adults and children. Hélio Gracie, president of the Federation, felt that children could not be tested on the adult-level moral qualifications he held for normal rank advancement. For this reason, the colors of yellow, orange, and green were reserved for practitioners under the age of 16. (Both children and adults of any age begin training as a new student wearing a white belt.)

In the 1990s, Brazilian judo clubs began awarding grey belts for children advancing from white belt. In the same interest of providing children with more frequent rank promotion within Gracie jiu-jitsu, Pedro Valente Sr. and his sons proposed an adaptation to the youth belt system. It involved intermediate belts consisting of half-colors, awarded between full colored belts. Each half-color promotion includes a color previously attained, and the next full color rank. For example, between the white belt and yellow belt, a student earns a white/yellow belt. Between yellow and orange, a student earns a white/orange, and then a yellow/orange.

This change provides a full ten belts (as opposed to the previous system of only four), allowing instructors to award children more frequently, and increase motivation among young students. The new system was approved by Hélio in 2005, and he added that it was the most efficient and simple way to give children self-confidence.

Each rank has a recommended maximum age, beginning with the white/yellow belt at age 5 and under. Each subsequent belt has the recommendation for each subsequent year of age, ending with the green belt at age 13 and below. Under this schedule of promotion, a junior student would receive a stripe roughly every three months, and a new belt after each year of training until the age of 13. After green, the next belt rank is blue, which has a required minimum age of 16 years.

Although typical, it is not necessary for a student to go through each rank individually. Notably, Grandmaster Relson Gracie reported that he started competing at the age of 6 or 7 as an orange belt (prior to the half-color system), and remained at that rank until he turned 16, when his father Hélio awarded him a brown belt.

=== Conversion between junior belt systems ===
The table below shows an approximate conversion between the Gracie jiu-jitsu ranking system and the International Brazilian Jiu-Jitsu Federation system. These are the two most common systems for junior belts in Brazilian jiu-jitsu. Both systems span practitioners from 4 years old through 15 years old.

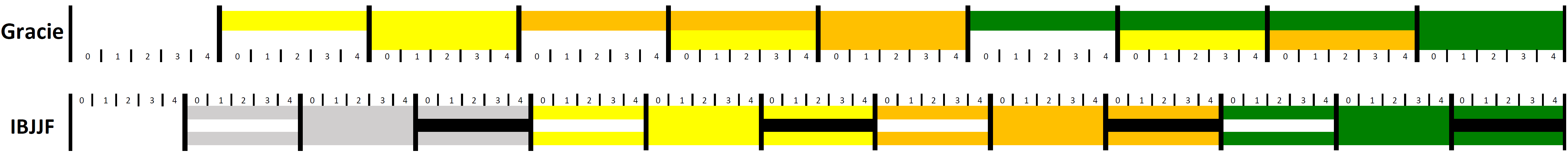
Junior belt approximate conversion.

== See also ==
- Brazilian jiu-jitsu ranking system
- List of Brazilian jiu-jitsu practitioners
- Jiu-Jitsu Federation of Rio de Janeiro
- Rank in Judo
- Black belt
- Sandbagging
