= Karate gi =

Traditional uniform worn for karate practice and competition

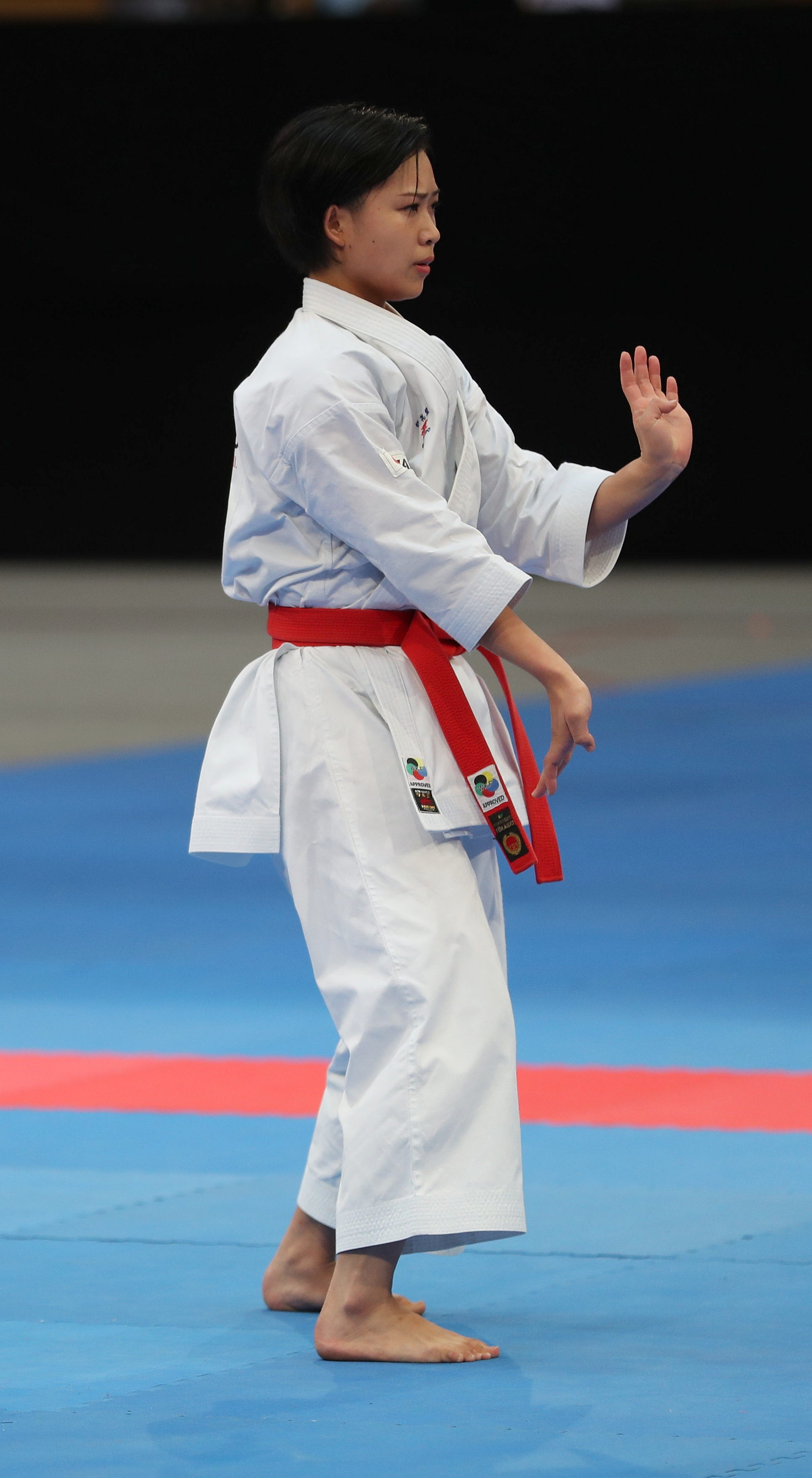
A karateka wearing a karategi

Karate gi (空手着 or 空手衣), also called keikogi or dogi, is the formal Japanese name for the traditional uniform used for Karate practice and competition.

== Description ==
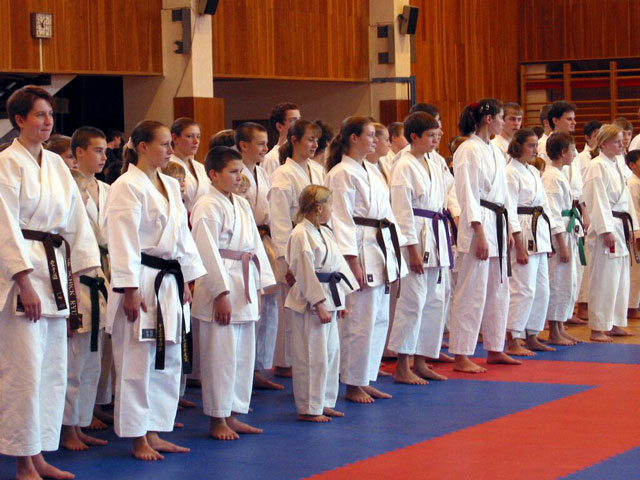
Karatekas at the dojo wearing karategis

A karategi is somewhat similar to a judogi (柔道着 or 柔道衣, Judo uniform) as it shares a common origin; however, the material and cut of the uniform is generally much lighter and looser fitting. The heaviest of Karategi is only 0.5 kg (16 oz) compared to some judogi at 1 kg (35 oz). Because of the nature of Karate training which emphasizes striking, kicking, and a more limited range of standing throws compared to Judo the karategi has evolved in a manner that maximizes mobility and speed without the extremely coarse and strong fabric required for grappling and throwing found in Judo. They are made from smooth cotton which may be brushed or ribbed for unrestricted movement and added comfort. Reinforced stitching is common, as to compensate for the stresses put on the gi.

Inferior karategi are often cut from a light fabric similar to that of a summer shirt. These karategi are easily ripped and tend to adhere to the practitioner's skin, creating some discomfort after any extensive perspiration is experienced. Such materials yield a karategi no heavier than 0.2 kg (8 oz).

Most quality karategi are cut from a light canvas-style cloth because of their ability to stand up to considerable amounts of rigorous application and abuse without restricting the mobility of the karateka. Typically, such karategi weigh at least 0.3 kg (10 oz).

The weight of the material helps Karateka determine how rigid the suit will be. 0.34 kg (12 oz) or 0.40 kg (14 oz) cotton canvas is standard, although some manufacturers offer 0.45 kg (16 oz) materials. It is not unusual for a martial artist to feel better cooled when using a heavier karategi, compared to the cheaper karategi. Naturally, heavier suits will be more rigid. This rigidity increases ventilation within the suit. The heavier gi also has a more pronounced sound when a move is executed. Despite the extra weight of the heavier fabrics, most experienced practitioners prefer them due to their durability, and the ability of the thicker fabric to wick away perspiration.

The three main cuts of karate gi are Kata, European, and Japanese. The Japanese cut has short sleeves and trousers for less restriction. This cut also has a longer lapel that prevents it from riding up over the belt (obi). The Kata cut is very rare. It has even shorter sleeves and is chosen more for aesthetic appeal. European Cut has longer sleeves and trousers. The lapel is shorter. This cut again is chosen for aesthetic appeal. Karate uniforms come in a wide array of colours. Most Karateka still wear white. Some clubs use a system of differing colours to differentiate students from instructors.

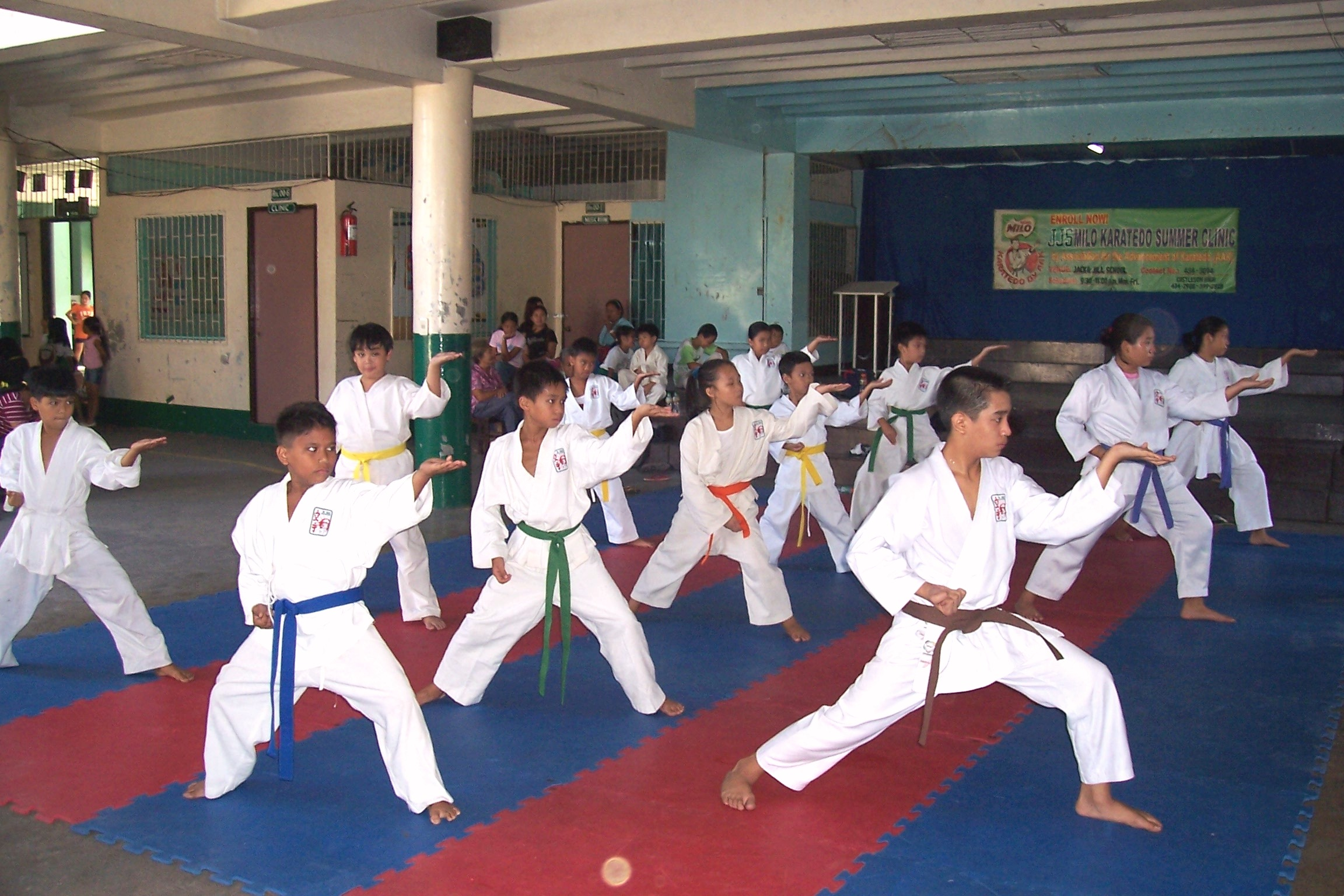
Karatekas hone their skills at the dojo wearing karate gi

Different styles of Karate have slightly different uniforms though all share the same basic design, differing only in the lengths of sleeves, legs, and the skirt of the uwagi (jacket). Many karateka tend to wear their obi (belt) much longer than judoka and other martial artists.

Karategi is sometimes worn to practice other arts, such as jujutsu, when the practitioners are young and can expect to grow out of the gi in a few years; in this case, their reduced durability in comparison to judogi is less of a factor, and buying karategi until the practitioner stops growing is more cost-effective.

The karate gi appears to have been developed from the Judo uniform. When Gichin Funakoshi demonstrated karate in Japan at the Kodokan, he still wore a traditional judo gi.

== See also ==
- Brazilian jiu-jitsu gi
- Judogi (Judo uniform)
- Karate
- Keikogi
- Tokaido (company)
