= Lucas Pinheiro =

Lucas Pinheiro may refer to:

- Lucas Dos Santos Pinheiro (born 1994), Brazilian Jiu Jitsu athlete
- Lucas Pinheiro Braathen (born 2000), Norwegian-Brazilian alpine ski racer
