= Fernando Cota =

Suspected American serial killer

- Undated photo of Cota
- Born: Fernando Velazco Cota; June 20, 1946; United States
- Died: October 14, 1984 (aged 38); Kaiser Foundation Hospital, Redwood City, California, U.S.
- Cause of death: Self-inflicted gunshot wound to the head
- Conviction: Rape
- Penalty: 8 years imprisonment (rape); None for murder

Details
- Victims: 1–5
- Span of crimes: August – October 1984
- Country: United States
- State: California
- Date apprehended: N/A

Fernando Velazco Cota (June 20, 1946 – October 14, 1984) was an American murderer, rapist and kidnapper who was the prime suspect in the murders of six women in San Jose, California, from August to October 1984. He died by suicide on October 14, 1984, after he was arrested for a botched kidnapping that resulted in the death of one victim.

== Biography ==
Little is known of Cota's background. He was born on June 20, 1946, and in the mid-1960s, he was drafted into the Army. After completing his training, he was sent to fight in the Vietnam War, where he saw active combat and was promoted to sergeant. After demobilization, Cota returned to the US, where he soon married a woman with whom he had several children. In the early 1970s, he began to exhibit an increased sex drive and began to sexually harass girls and women. While he lived in El Paso, Texas, with his family, Cota attacked a nurse in 1975, binding, bathing and then raping her. A few days later, he sent the victim a note that said: "Sorry for the argument we had. Still loving you." While he was suspected of several other rapes in the area, he would later be convicted of this crime and sentenced to 20 years imprisonment, as a result of which his wife divorced him. During his imprisonment, Cota went through several rehabilitation programs and earned a reputation as an exemplary inmate, thanks to which he was paroled on September 29, 1983. Shortly after, he left Texas and moved to La Paz, Mexico, where he met someone who informed him that there were many job opportunities in Silicon Valley. Using this information, Cota moved to San Jose, California, found housing near the San Jose State University and a job as a computer programmer for Aydin Microwave Inc. While working there, he was described as acting in a strange and eccentric manner towards his female colleagues. He never registered as a sex offender, despite being legally required to do so.

On the evening of October 14, 1984, Cota's white Chevrolet van was spotted by traffic police about fifteen miles north of San Jose, looping erratically on Highway 101 near San Carlos. After it stopped, the police officers, questioning the driver's sanity, demanded that Fernando show his papers and allow them to inspect the interior of the van. Cota ignored their demands, took out a .22 caliber revolver and started shouting "Kill me! Kill me! I'm very sick. If you don't kill me, I'll kill myself!", before shooting himself in the palate. He was driven to the Kaiser Foundation Hospital in Redwood City, where he succumbed to his injuries. While inspecting the inside of his van, the officers found a wooden box which contained the corpse of a young woman, whose hands were tied with a chain and rope. The deceased was identified as 21-year-old Kim Marie Dunham, an employee at the Orchard Supply Hardware store in Milpitas who had gone missing the day before. Left with only her underwear and stockings, she had been beaten and raped before Cota evidently strangled her. In addition to her body, officers also found a plastic trash bag containing blood-splattered clothes, a purse, boots and a cloth belt.

Subsequently, due to the nature of the crime and these discoveries, the local police department started re-examining a slew of recent murder cases, in an effort to establish whether Cota was responsible for them.

== Investigation ==
Following Cota's death, the police received a search warrant for his rented apartment. In there, investigators found a small closet, 60 by 100 cms wide, where Cota had attached metal braces to the walls through which ropes and manacles were pulled. Supposedly, he kept his handcuffed victims in this closet and watched them suffer through a peephole drilled in the door. On the walls, inside the closet, detectives found many fingerprints, which were later sent for examination in order to identify other potential victims. Aside from this, the investigators found fake ID cards, a false police badge, numerous women's blouses, six pairs of women's shoes and advertisements for tenants, which Cota posted on the campus of the San Jose State University, inviting local students to rent a room in his apartment. During the investigation, six girls were included in the list of victims, all killed between September and October. They were all strangled, stabbed or beaten to death. Indirect evidence of Cota's involvement in these murders was a knife and a piece of a steel pipe found in his van, which could have been used as a murder weapon.

The list of potential victims included the following:

- Tania Zack (21) – employee at the County Bank and Trust who went missing on August 27, when her car ran out of gas while travelling to work on Highway 17. Zack's body was later found in a ravine in the Santa Cruz Mountains, near Los Gatos, on September 15, her cause of death determined as a head injury. Cota was eventually ruled out after no evidence was found linking him to the case. The real killer, Damon Joe Wells, was arrested in 1989, pleaded guilty to the crime and was sentenced to life imprisonment in 1990.
- Kelly Ralston (21) – university student with a brown belt in karate. She was found stabbed to death in her rented apartment the day after Zack had disappeared.
- Gwendolyn Hoffman (56) – went missing from her home in Campbell on September 10. Her husband later found a note on behalf of the kidnapper which said to not call anyone and that they would contact them. However, that never occurred, and Hoffman's body was found the next day in the trunk of her car, which was parked a mile away from her house. She had been strangled with a wire, which was left beside her body.
- Lori Leigh Miller (19) – went missing on September 26, three days before her 20th birthday, last seen leaving her apartment near the university. Ten days later, her body was found near a road in the southeastern part of the city. Miller had been strangled.
- Teresa Linda Sunder (29) – reported missing on September 16, and found fourteen days later in an abandoned two-storey house in the center of San Jose; her cause of death was determined to be from a head injury. It was noted that Miller lived directly opposite Cota, and that Sunder's body was found not far from his apartment.

Despite their best efforts, the investigators were unable to conclusively link Cota to these murders. However, aside from the Zack murder, he has never been eliminated as a suspect in any of them.

== Exhumation of remains ==
In August 2025, the United States Senate passed a bill proposed by Texas senators Ted Cruz and John Cornyn that demanded that Cota's remains be exhumed and removed from the Fort Sam Houston National Cemetery. The bill was proposed after a Change.org petition was filed by a family member of one of Cota's alleged victims.

The bill was signed into law in December 2025, with the Department of Veterans Affairs scheduled to disinter his remains in 2026. On April 27, 2026, his remains were removed from the cemetery.

== See also ==
- List of serial killers in the United States
