= Tokaido (company) =

Japanese company manufacturing martial arts equipment

- Company type: Private
- Industry: Martial arts equipment
- Founded: 1958
- Founder: Shizuo Sugiura
- Headquarters: Tokyo, Japan
- Number of locations: Several offices and sales outlets in Japan, one office in the USA (2010)
- Area served: Worldwide
- Key people: Taro Sugiura (President)
- Products: Karate uniforms, belts, and related products
- Website: Tokaido Japan Direct International (in English); Tokaido Japan (in Japanese)

Tokaido (東海堂, Tōkaidō)^{[a]} is a Japanese company that manufactures karate uniforms, belts, and related products. It is the world's oldest manufacturer of uniforms specifically for karate training, with a reputation for high quality.^{[b]} Tokaido is based in Tokyo, Japan, and is owned and operated by the Sugiura family.

== History ==
Tokaido's founder, Shizuo Sugiura, was a martial arts enthusiast who would watch demonstrations and competitions of many Japanese martial arts. With time, he became increasingly interested in the art of karate. At the time, karate practitioners would simply use judo uniforms or other clothing for training. Judo emphasizes grappling, so training in that art typically requires a strong, heavy uniform; karate emphasizes striking, so training in that art does not require so heavy a uniform. Sugiura was already working in the clothing industry, and decided to combine his work with his interest in karate by producing uniforms specifically for karate training.

In 1958, Sugiura established the Tokaido company. Its name means Eastern Sea Shop in Japanese, and comes from the name of Sugiura's home region on the east coast of Honshū island. Sugiura began supplying sample uniforms to instructors of the newly formed Japan Karate Association (JKA), and used their feedback to improve the designs and manufacturing. The JKA helped popularize the Tokaido brand amongst Shotokan karate practitioners; the karate masters who appear in Masatoshi Nakayama's series of Best Karate textbooks were wearing Tokaido uniforms.

== Current status ==
Tokaido produces two main styles of karate uniform: a standard version used more for regular training and kata (patterns) competition, and a lighter version used more for kumite (sparring) competition. The uniforms and belts are cut and sewn by hand. Apart from uniforms and belts, the company provides embroidery of Japanese words (such as individual practitioners' or karate schools' names) and rank markings, and also produces badges and labels matching major karate organizations. Tokaido has also produced custom-made uniforms made by master tailors Genzo and Waisetsu. These items are available only to karate practitioners ranked 3rd dan or higher.

The company is owned and operated by the Sugiura brothers, sons of the founder. It has headquarters in Kōjimachi, a suburb of Tokyo, and a factory in Nagoya. Tokaido has an international office in the United States of America, and several offices and sales outlets in Japan.

== See also ==
- Kabushiki gaisha
- Karate gi
- Uniform

== Notes ==
a. More completely, the company's name in Japanese is Kabushiki Kaisha Tokaido (株式 会社 東海堂, Kabushiki-gaisha Tōkaidō), which indicates that it is a specific type of company under Japanese corporate law.

b. Others have attempted to profit from the company's reputation by producing fake Tokaido uniforms. At least one retailer has published a guide to distinguishing between real and fake Tokaido uniforms.
