= SJJIF World Jiu-Jitsu Championship =

Brazilian jiu-jitsu competition

Competition details
- Discipline: Sport Jiu-Jitsu (gi and no-gi)
- Type: Annual
- Organiser: Sport Jiu Jitsu International Federation (SJJIF)

History
- First edition: 2013 World SJJIF Jiu-Jitsu Championships in Long Beach, California
- Most recent: 2026 SJJIF World Jiu-Jitsu Championship

The SJJIF World Jiu-Jitsu Championship commonly known as SJJIF Worlds is a Brazilian jiu-jitsu tournament (gi and no-gi) held once every year by the Sport Jiu Jitsu International Federation (SJJIF), one of jiu-jitsu's international governing bodies with the mission to make Jiu-Jitsu an Olympic sport. The last edition of the championship took place in Tokyo in September 2026.

== History ==
In 1967, a federation known as the Jiu-Jitsu Federation of Guanabara was established by Hélio Gracie, Alvaro Barreto and Oswaldo Fadda under the supervision of the National Sports Council, Brazil sports governing body, with the aim of developing a competitive sport version of jiu-jitsu, at the time a self-defence and street fighting art. In June 1973, jiu-jitsu was officially recognised as a sport, in December, the first championship was organised in Rio de Janeiro, marking the beginning of sport Jiu-Jitsu. In 2005 the North American Brazilian Jiu-jitsu Federation (NAJJF) was created.

In June 2011 the Sport Jiu-Jitsu International Federation (SJJIF), was established as a non-profit organisation with the aim of meeting the International Olympic Committee requirements and promoting jiu-jitsu as a sport around the world. The SJJIF is considered the world governing body for the sport of Sport Jiu Jitsu.

In December 2013 the SJJIF, in conjunction with the NABJJF, hosted its first international event, the World SJJIF Jiu-Jitsu Championships, at the same location as the World IBJJF Championship, the Walter Pyramid at CSU in Long Beach, California, USA. Under SJJIF competition rules, matches are disputed without advantages points or referee decisions, black belt João Silva is president of the SJJIF and organiser of the event. Cash prizes are awarded to the winners of the main event. The World SJJIF Jiu-Jitsu Championship counts at least 2500 competitors each year including more than 100 black belts. 72 countries were represented at the 2018 SJJIF World Jiu-Jitsu Championship in front of 7,000 spectators over the 3 days of competition, while in 2017, 54 nationalities were represented. The 2019 edition gathered 3000 competitors on 15 fighting areas. The 2023 edition of the tournament will take place in July 2023 in Allen, Texas.

== Weight classes ==
The men's gi division has a total of 9 divisions from −57.5 kg to the Ultra-Heavy division +100.2 kg. The women's gi division comprised a total of 7 weight classes from −48.5 kg up to the Heavy division +81.6 kg. The men's no-gi division has a total of 9 divisions from −56 kg to the Ultra-Heavy division +98.4 kg. The women's no-gi division comprised a total of 7 weight classes from −46.7 kg up to the Heavy division +80.3 kg.

Gi
Divisions	Men	Women
Rooster	57.6 kg (127.0 lb)	48.5 kg (106.9 lb)
Light Feather	64 kg (141.1 lb)	53.4 kg (117.7 lb)
Feather	70 kg (154.3 lb)	61.2 kg (134.9 lb)
Light	76 kg (167.6 lb)	68 kg (149.9 lb)
Middle	82.1 kg (181.0 lb)	74.8 kg (164.9 lb)
Medium Heavy	88.1 kg (194.2 lb)	81.6 kg (179.9 lb)
Heavy	94.1 kg (207.5 lb)	over 81.6 kg (179.9 lb)
Super Heavy	100.2 kg (220.9 lb)	n/a
Ultra Heavy	over 100.2 kg (220.9 lb)	n/a

No-Gi
Divisions	Men	Women
Rooster	56 kg (123.5 lb)	46.7 kg (103.0 lb)
Light Feather	62.1 kg (136.9 lb)	52.6 kg (116.0 lb)
Feather	68 kg (149.9 lb)	59.4 kg (131.0 lb)
Light	74.2 kg (163.6 lb)	66.2 kg (145.9 lb)
Middle	80.3 kg (177.0 lb)	73 kg (160.9 lb)
Medium Heavy	86.2 kg (190.0 lb)	80.3 kg (177.0 lb)
Heavy	92.3 kg (203.5 lb)	over 80.3 kg (177.0 lb)
Super Heavy	98.4 kg (216.9 lb)	n/a
Ultra Heavy	over 98.4 kg (216.9 lb)	n/a

== Notable champions ==
- Lucas "Hulk" Barbosa
- Andressa Cintra
- Keenan Cornelius
- Kaynan Duarte
- Bia Mesquita
- Johnny Muñoz Jr.
- Lucas Dos Santos Pinheiro
- Tayane Porfírio
- Kendall Reusing
- Nathalie Ribeiro
- Shannon Ritch
- Hannette Staack
- Maxine Thylin
