= Sport Jiu-Jitsu International Federation =

Brazilian Jiu-Jitsu non-profit federation

Sport Jiu Jitsu International Federation
- Abbreviation: SJJIF
- Purpose: Governing, Regulatory
- Headquarters: Los Angeles, California, United States
- Region served: Worldwide
- Members: sjjif.com/membership.php
- Official language: English, Portuguese
- Presidents: João Silva, Patricia Silva e Sam Aschidamini
- Affiliations: NABJJF, SJJSAF, ESJJF, ASJJF
- Website: sjjif.com

The Sport Jiu-Jitsu International Federation (SJJIF) is a non-profit organisation, one of the international governing bodies for the sport of Brazilian jiu-jitsu with the goal of making it an Olympic sport. The SJJIF hosts several tournaments, its most renowned being the SJJIF World Jiu-Jitsu Championship.

== History ==
In 1967, a federation known as the Jiu-Jitsu Federation of Guanabara was established by Hélio Gracie, Alvaro Barreto and Oswaldo Fadda under the supervision of the National Sports Council, Brazil sports governing body, with the aim of developing a competitive sport version of jiu-jitsu, at the time a self-defence and street fighting art. In June 1973, jiu-jitsu was officially recognised as a sport, in December, the first championship was organised in Rio de Janeiro, marking the beginning of sport Jiu-Jitsu. In 2005 the North American Brazilian Jiu-jitsu Federation (NAJJF) was created.

In June 2011 the Sport Jiu-Jitsu International Federation (SJJIF), was established as a non-profit organisation with the aim of meeting the International Olympic Committee requirements and promoting jiu-jitsu as a sport around the world. The SJJIF is considered the world governing body for the sport of Sport Jiu Jitsu. Speaking to the New York Times, João Silva, president of the SJJIF stated that the federation was seeking to unify the sport to gain Olympic recognition.

== SJJIF tournaments ==
=== SJJIF World Jiu-Jitsu Championship ===
In December 2013, in conjunction with the NABJJF, the SJJIF hosted its first international event, the World SJJIF Jiu-Jitsu Championships, at the same location as the World IBJJF Championship, the Walter Pyramid at CSU in Long Beach, California, USA. Under SJJIF competition rules, matches are disputed without advantages points or referee decisions, black belt João Silva is president of the SJJIF and organiser of the event. Cash prizes are awarded to the winners of the main event.

=== Adapted Jiu-Jitsu World Championships ===
In 2017 the SJJIF started the Adapted Jiu-Jitsu World Championships, a tournament for Brazilian Jiu-Jitsu practitioners with a form of disability and/or impairment with the goal of reaching the Paralympics, Deaflympics and special games recognized by the Olympic Committee. Adapted Jiu-Jitsu is divided into 3 categories: Deaf Jiu-Jitsu, Para Jiu-Jitsu, and Special Jiu-Jitsu for athletes with intellectual and cognitive disabilities and impairments.
