= Grandmaster (martial arts) =

Martial artist title

Grandmaster and Master are titles used to describe or address some senior or experienced martial artists. Typically these titles are honorary in nature, meaning that they do not confer rank, but rather distinguish the individual as very highly revered in their school, system, or style.

== History ==
Asian martial arts traditionally use terms that are usually translated as "teacher" and the use of "master" was a Western invention derived from 1950s United States war veterans returning home with stories of the incredible martial feats of certain individuals and groups. Subsequently, they found their way into martial arts culture as marketing tactics to the extent that the titles are aligned to the 'elderly martial arts master' stock character. In Asian countries, such titles are more commonly reserved for religious leaders and saints.

== Modern use ==
The use of "master," "grandmaster," etc. is decided within an individual art or organization. The use may be self assigned; for example having promoted a student to 'teacher' level, or may be assigned by a governing body in arts with a more formalised structure, and some do not use it at all, for historic reasons or to avoid the 'elderly master' stereotype. The modern use of Dan rankings and Black belt and Red belt in martial arts both derive from Judo where they were adopted by its founder Kanō Jigorō.

== Traditional systems ==
There are many terms similar or equivalent to 'master' used by various martial arts traditions. Some of these terms derive from older systems, while others are relatively modern.

=== Japan ===
Japanese martial arts commonly use Sensei (先生) meaning "teacher" or literally translated, "born first" or "one who has gone before". A Sensei is a person who has knowledge and is willing to teach that knowledge to another. A Sensei assists students in ken shiki "the pursuit of knowledge". Several Japanese organizations, such as the Bujinkan, Kodokan (Judo), and most branches of Aikido, formally award a certificate conferring the title Shihan ("teacher of teachers" or "master teacher") to recognize high-ranking or highly distinguished instructors. Sōke (宗家), meaning "the head family [house]," is sometimes used to refer to "founder of a style" because many modern sōke are the first generation headmasters of their art, but most correctly refers to the current head. A sōke is considered the ultimate authority within their art and has the authority to issue a menkyo kaiden certificate indicating that someone has mastered all aspects of the style.

=== Korea ===
The actual Korean word for a student's master is sonsaeng. This term is only used by the student when speaking to the instructor. The student is haksaeng. (학생 HakSaeng 學生) Many Korean titles are often mistakenly translated as "grandmaster" (태사님 TaeSaNim 太師님). Sonseang-nim (선생님 SeonSaengNim 先生님) is a general term for a teacher of any subject as well as a respectful form of the word "you". Martial arts instructors (in Korea 4th Dan and above) are called Sabom-nim (사범님 SaBeomNim 師範님).

=== China ===
Various dialects of the Chinese language use different terms.

"Sifu" is a common romanization, although the term and pronunciation are also used in other southern languages. In Mandarin Chinese, it is spelled "shifu" in pinyin. Using non-rhotic British English pronunciation, in Mandarin it would sound something similar to "sure foo". Using IPA, 'shi' is pronounced 'ʂɨ'. The 'i' is a short vowel. Many martial arts studios incorrectly pronounce this like "she foo". In Cantonese, it is said as "see foo" (almost like "sea food", without the "d" on the end). (師傅 or 師父; Pinyin: shīfu, Standard pinyin: si1 fu6) a modern term for "teacher".

The term Shifu is a combination of the characters "teacher" and "father" (師父) or a combination of the characters "teacher" and "mentor" (師傅). The traditional Chinese martial arts school, or kwoon (館, guǎn) is an extended family headed by the Shifu. The Shifu's teacher is the "師公 honorable master" or Shigong. Similarly the Shifu's wife is the Shimu "teacher mother" and the grandmaster's wife is known as: 師姥 shi lao; or 師婆 shi po. Male and female students who began training before you and are thus senior, are 師兄Shixiong "teacher older brothers" and 師姐 Shijie "teacher's sisters". Women in traditional society did not have the same status as males (despite what modern movies depict). Students junior to you are your Shidi and Shimei. The pattern extends to uncles, aunts, cousins, great uncles, and so forth (see above for a complete list of relational terms).

== Popular culture ==
Such titles may be, to some extent, aligned to the elderly martial arts master stock character in fiction. In Asian martial arts, traditional titular systems vary between nations and arts, but terms such as "teacher" were more common than "master." The modern use came from Eastern to Western society in the 1950s with stories of martial feats seen in Asia.

== See also ==
- Dan (rank)
- Jiu-jitsu rankings
- Judo rankings
- Karate rankings
- Kung Fu rankings
- Taekwondo ranking
