= Lucas Dos Santos Pinheiro =

Lucas Pinheiro
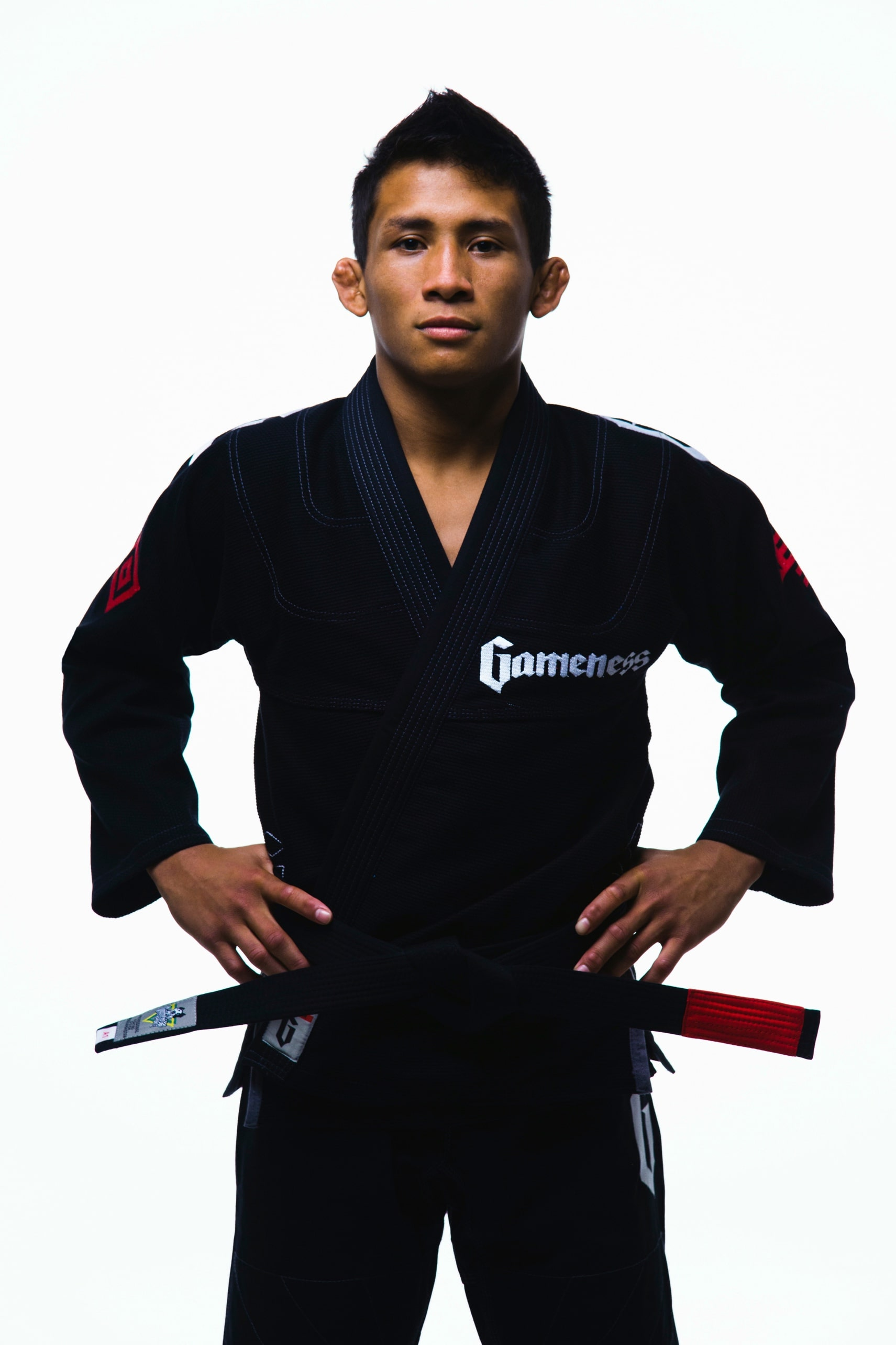

Personal information
- Full name: Lucas Dos Santos Pinheiro
- Nickname: Bad Boy
- Nationality: Brazilian-American
- Born: February 11, 1994 (age 32) Manaus, Amazon, Brazil
- Height: 5 ft 4 in (163 cm)
- Weight: 135 lb (61 kg)

Sport
- Sport: Brazilian Jiu-Jitsu
- Weight class: Rooster
- Rank: 1st degree black belt under Andre Galvao
- Team: Atos Jiu-Jitsu

Lucas Dos Santos Pinheiro, known as, Lucas Pinheiro (born 11 February 1994) is a black belt Brazilian Jiu Jitsu athlete who competes professionally for the Atos Jiu Jitsu Team in the United States. Pinheiro is a 2023 World Jiu-Jitsu Champion.

== Career ==
Lucas Pinheiro is a 1st degree black belt student under BJJ legend André Galvão in San Diego, California. Pinheiro is also a former student of Faustino Neto (Mestre Pina) and Cícero Costha. He has earned important medals at the Brazilian National Jiu-Jitsu Championship as well as World Jiu-Jitsu Championship and is currently one of the top competitors in the Rooster and Light-featherweight divisions. In 2019, Pinheiro was ranked #9 over all weights by IBJJF in the No-Gi category.

Pinheiro won his first IBJJF No Gi World Championship in 2022, and his first IBJJF World Championship in 2023. At the end of 2023, he announced his decision to become a coach alongside Ronaldo 'Jacare' Souza at Jacare Martial Arts.

== Instructor lineage ==
Mitsuyo Maeda → Carlos Gracie, Sr. → Osvaldo Alves → Faustino Neto → Carlos Holanda → Lucas Pinheiro

== Championships and accomplishments ==
=== Grappling ===
2014

- (gold) IBJJF Rio International Open

2015

- (gold) CBJJ Brazilian Nationals
- (gold) UAEJJF Brazil National Pro
- (gold) IBJJF Austin International Open
- (silver) IBJJF World Championship
- (silver) IBJJF Dallas International Open No-Gi
- (bronze) IBJJF Austin International Open (absolute)

2016

- (gold) IBJJF San Antonio International Open
- (silver) IBJJF Pan American Championship

2017

- (gold) IBJJF American Nationals
- (gold) IBJJF American Nationals No-Gi
- (gold) IBJJF Austin International Open
- (gold) IBJJF Miami International Open No-Gi
- (gold) IBJJF Atlanta International Open
- (gold) IBJJF Dallas International Open
- (gold) IBJJF Dallas International Open No-Gi
- (silver) IBJJF Miami International Open
- (silver) IBJJF World Championship No-Gi
- (silver) IBJJF Pan American Championship
- (bronze) IBJJF World Championship
- (bronze) IBJJF Dallas International Open (absolute)
- (bronze) IBJJF Austin International Open (absolute)
- (bronze) IBJJF Austin International Open No-Gi (absolute)

2018

- (gold) IBJJF American Nationals
- (gold) IBJJF American Nationals No-Gi
- (gold) SJJIF World Jiu-Jitsu Championship
- (gold) SJJIF World Championship No-Gi
- (gold) ACBJJ North American Championship
- (silver) ACBJJ Worlds Jiu Jitsu
- (bronze) IBJJF Pan American Championship

2019

- (gold) IBJJF Pan American No-Gi
- (gold) IBJJF American Nationals No-Gi
- (gold) IBJJF Las Vegas International Open
- (gold) IBJJF Las Vegas International Open No-Gi
- (gold) IBJJF Austin International Open
- (gold) IBJJF Austin International Open No-Gi
- (gold) IBJJF Houston International Open
- (gold) F2W Featherweight
- (silver) IBJJF American Nationals

2020

- (gold) IBJJF Houston International Open
- (gold) IBJJF Pan American Championship

2022

- (gold) IBJJF World Championship No-Gi
- (gold) CBJJ Brazilian Nationals No-Gi

2023

- (gold) IBJJF World Championship
- (gold) CBJJ Brazilian Nationals
