= Brazilian jiu-jitsu gi =

Jacket and trousers worn for jiu-jitsu

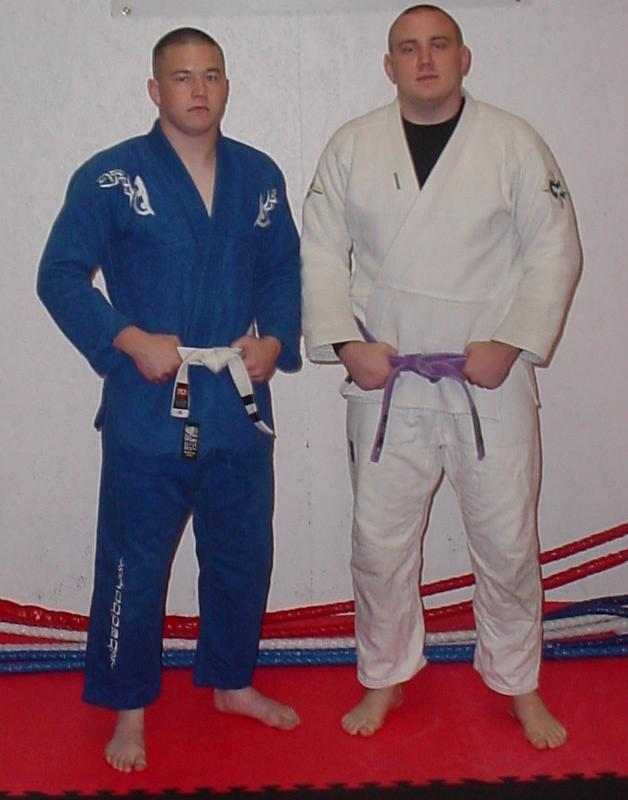
Two Brazilian jiu-jitsu practitioners wearing gis

The Brazilian jiu-jitsu gi is the traditional training uniform adapted from the judo keikogi (稽古着) for use in Brazilian jiu-jitsu. A gi (着), meaning dress or clothes, is composed of a heavy cotton jacket, reinforced drawstring pants, and a belt which communicates rank. Some schools require the jacket and trousers to be the same color, while more relaxed schools do not enforce matching top and bottom color. The jiu-jitsu gi is often referred to as kimono by Brazilians. Some jiu-jitsu schools avoid using a gi and instead focus on no-gi jiu-jitsu, like 10th Planet Jiu Jitsu.

== General regulations ==
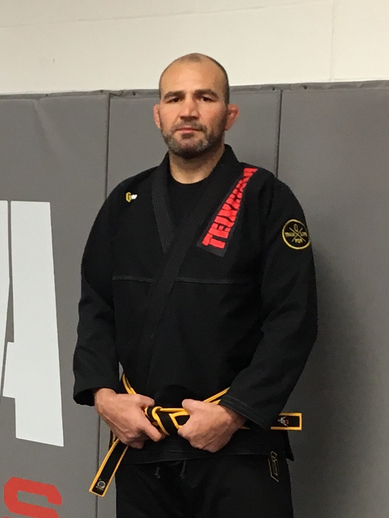
Glover Teixeira wearing a black gi

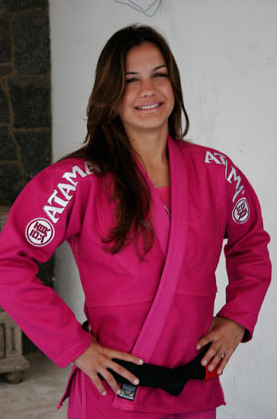
Kyra Gracie wearing a pink gi

The only colors allowed for international championships are white, black or blue. In some jurisdictions, this is relaxed to allow any single solid color.

According to article 8 of IBJJF rules, a competition gi must conform to these specifications:

- The gi must be constructed of cotton or similar material and be in good condition. The material may not be excessively thick or hard to the point where it will obstruct the opponent.
- Colors may be black, white or blue, no combined colors (white kimono with blue pants, etc.)
- The jacket is to be of sufficient length down to the thighs, sleeves must reach the wrist with arms extended in front of the body. The sleeve should follow the official measurements according to IBJJF (this is measured from the shoulder to the wrist).
- Belt width must be 4–5 cm, with belt color corresponding to the practitioner's rank. The belt must be tied around the waist with a double knot, tight enough to secure the kimono closed. An extremely worn/discoloured belt may need to be replaced before competing.
- Athletes are not permitted to compete with torn kimonos, sleeves or pants that are not of proper length, or with T-shirts underneath the kimono (except for females).
- A BJJ practitioner is not allowed to paint his/her gi. Exceptions can be made for teams competition.

In addition to the above requirements, pockets of any kind are not allowed in a gi used at tournaments.

A special gi checking tool is sometimes used to determine acceptable measurements and fit of the gi. This tool resembles a block of wood 3.5 cm x 2.5 cm x 15 cm with a slit cut in the middle and is used to measure the following:

- The jacket lapel must be 5 cm wide.
- There must be at least 7 cm of room from the bottom of the competitor's wrist to the bottom of the sleeve.
- The jacket lapel must not be thicker than 1.3 cm.

=== Patches ===
According to article 13 of IBJJF rules, patches may be placed on the gi in one of thirteen different locations:

On the jacket:

- Left upper arm
- Left upper shoulder
- Front right upper shoulder
- Front right upper arm
- Front below the belt
- Back below the belt
- Back below the collar and above the belt

On the pants:

- Above the front left knee
- Above the front right knee
- Below the front left knee (with at least 15 cm of space to the floor without patch to allow for grabbing)
- Below the front right knee (with at least 15 cm of space to the floor without patch to allow for grabbing)
- Along the back of the left leg
- Along the back of the right leg

== Fabric and weave ==
=== Pants ===
Traditionally, gi pants are made of a sturdy cotton canvas, or denim (with reinforced seams/knees). Tough and light weight materials have started to become more popular in recent years as cooler hot weather gis have become more popular. It is common in tournaments to see competitors wearing ripstop pants with a standard cotton gi top.

=== Jacket ===
Single Weave Cotton: This is lighter and typically less expensive. It is often used for hot weather training. Being lighter weight (typically between 300–550 g/m^{2}), this weave is not as durable as a heavier fabric.

Pearl Weave: The most common form of weave used in BJJ industry. Its strong and very durable. As the name suggests the pearl weave has the appearance of multiple strings of pearls aligned together. This appearance is created when two sets of weft are used, one thin and tight, and one looser and wider. The looser weft creates the appearance of pearls.

Gold Weave Cotton: This material is in-between the single and double weave with regards to weight and durability. Gold weave is a standard that was originally required for competition by the Brazilian Jiu Jitsu Confederation, although this has now been relaxed to allow different jacket weaves.

Double Weave Cotton: This gi top is made of significantly more fabric than a single weave. It is heavier, harder wearing, and is typically more expensive. The thickness of the gi can make it more difficult for an opponent to grip the fabric, but the weight of the gi (typically between 650–1050 g/m^{2}) makes them retain more heat. The stiffness of the material can make double weaves more abrasive on the skin of opponents and wearers alike.

Ripstop Fabrics: Ripstop fabrics are made of many different materials (cotton, silk, polyester, and nylon) woven together to produce an extremely strong and light weight material that is difficult to tear or rip. Due to the weave of the material this type of Gi top can be made light weight (lighter than a single weave gi) while still remaining strong. Since this material is woven thinner than cotton gis, an opponent can more easily grab and manipulate it.

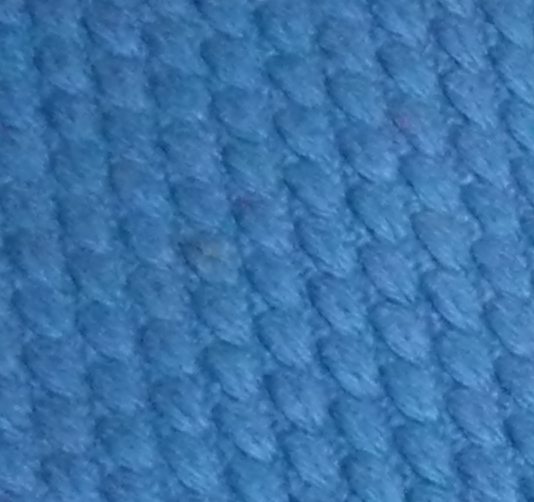
Closeup of double weave pattern on an HCK competition double gi.

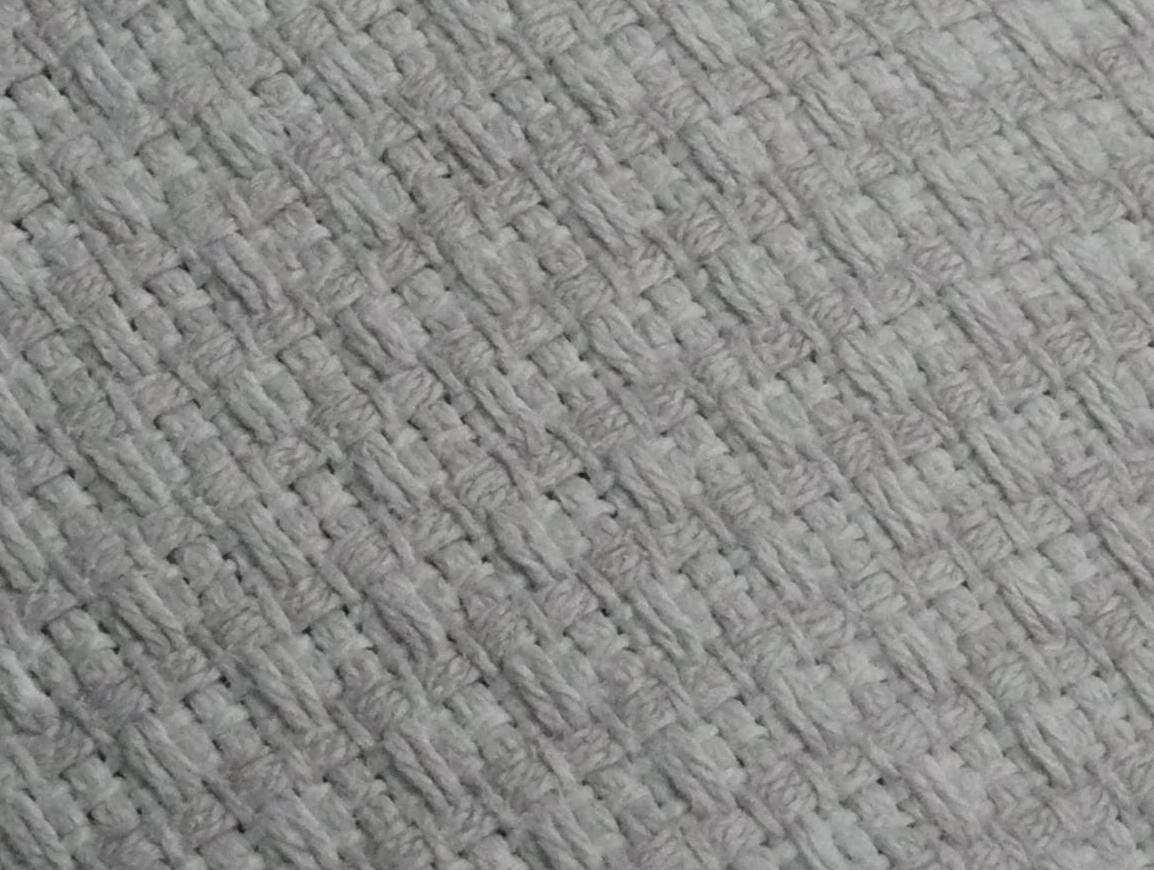
Closeup of gold weave pattern on an OTM blank white gi.

== Maintenance ==
Due to the nature of wrestling/grappling and the diseases that can come from close contact between people, the gi is typically washed after each class. As with many cotton products, a cotton gi must be laundered in cold water and line dried to avoid shrinkage. This is important to most jiu-jitsu practitioners as even pre-shrunk gi material has a tendency to shrink further in hot water and a hot dryer cycle. To preserve the life of the gi, bleaching is highly discouraged, as this can weaken the fibers of the material and cause them to tear more easily. Line drying in bright sunlight is commonly suggested to help remove smells from the gi, due to the bacterial killing properties of UV light. Hanging the gi in direct sunlight can damage the integrity of the fabric and reduce its durability, and can also stiffen up fibres in a gi.

While most gis sold today are made of a colorfast material, some manufacturers recommend that a darker coloured gi (blue, black, red, etc.) be washed with 2-3 cups (500–750 mL) of white vinegar the first time that the outfit is laundered. This helps to set the dye in the gi and will minimize fading.

It is advised to leave a gi to dry in indirect sunlight, and avoid drying in drying machines, as this can cause shrinkage.

== Differences to the judogi ==
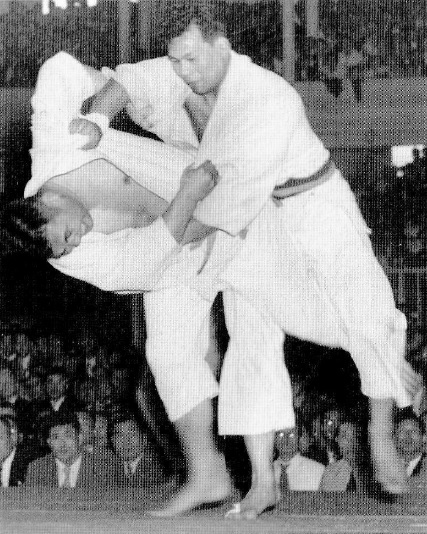
Judogi as worn at the 1951 All-Japan Judo Championships

The jiu-jitsu gi is similar to the judogi with a few differences. Jiu-jitsu regulations allow for tighter cuffs on the pants and jacket, and the skirt (section of the gi beneath the belt) is shorter. This allows the practitioner to benefit from a closer fit, providing for more fluid movement and less material for an opponent to manipulate. Team, sponsor, and manufacturer's patches are often more prominently displayed on a jiu-jitsu gi than would be allowed in judo. The judo gi is generally thicker than that of a jiu-jitsu gi which makes them harder to grab. In jiu-jitsu everyday practice it's also more accepted to wear gis of non-standard colors such as dark green, black and purple, whereas in judo only white and blue are generally accepted.

== See also ==
- Judogi
- Jujutsugi
- Keikogi
- Brazilian jiu-jitsu ranking system
- Gracie jiu-jitsu ranking system
