= Jiu-Jitsu Federation of Rio de Janeiro =

Jiu-Jitsu association

Federação de Jiu-Jitsu do Estado do Rio de Janeiro
- Abbreviation: FJJERJ
- Type: Sports federation
- Purpose: Governing, Regulatory
- Headquarters: Rio de Janeiro, Brazil
- Region served: Rio de Janeiro, Brazil
- Official language: Portuguese
- President: Carlos Robson Gracie
- Website: fjjrio.com.br

Jiu-Jitsu Federation of Rio de Janeiro also known as Jiu-Jitsu Federation of Guanabara is a governing body of Brazilian jiu-jitsu in the state of Rio de Janeiro, Brazil. The federation is the official certifying entity for Gracie jiu-jitsu. Specifically, it controls all teaching certifications, as well as all promotions to the rank of black belt and above.

== Belt rankings ==
The federation awards a black belt after 6 to 15 years of jiu-jitsu practice. The black belt ranks as follows (from highest to lowest):

Title	Belt color	Degree
Grand master	Red (black rank sleeve, gold end bars, and 9-10 thin white stripes)	9th and 10th
Master	Coral [red and black] (black rank sleeve, white end bars, and 7-8 thin white stripes)	7th and 8th
Professor	Black (red rank sleeve, white end bars, and 1-6 thin white stripes)	1st through 6th
Instructor	Black (red rank sleeve with thick, white end bars)	(no degree)
Assistant instructor	Black (red rank sleeve)	(no degree)
Fighter	Black (white rank sleeve)	(no degree)

The coral belt is indicative of a professor who has decided to retire from fighting. This was shown when Rickson Gracie wore a 7th degree solid black belt.

All promotions involving any black belt rank require a recommendation of two masters and approval of at least five officials of the federation. Ranks below black belt are awarded by individual professors and are then confirmed publicly through competition with other students of the same rank. Beginners and new students wear a white belt. Adult belt levels progress from white to blue, then purple, and finally brown, after which the practitioner becomes eligible for a black belt. There is a larger number of belt colors for children.

== Tournaments ==
- Grand Master Helio Gracie Championship
- State Championship
- Ryan Gracie No-Gi State Championship
- Carlson Gracie Cup
- Conde Koma Championship
- Rolls Gracie Championship
