= Red belt (martial arts) =

Colored belt used in some martial arts

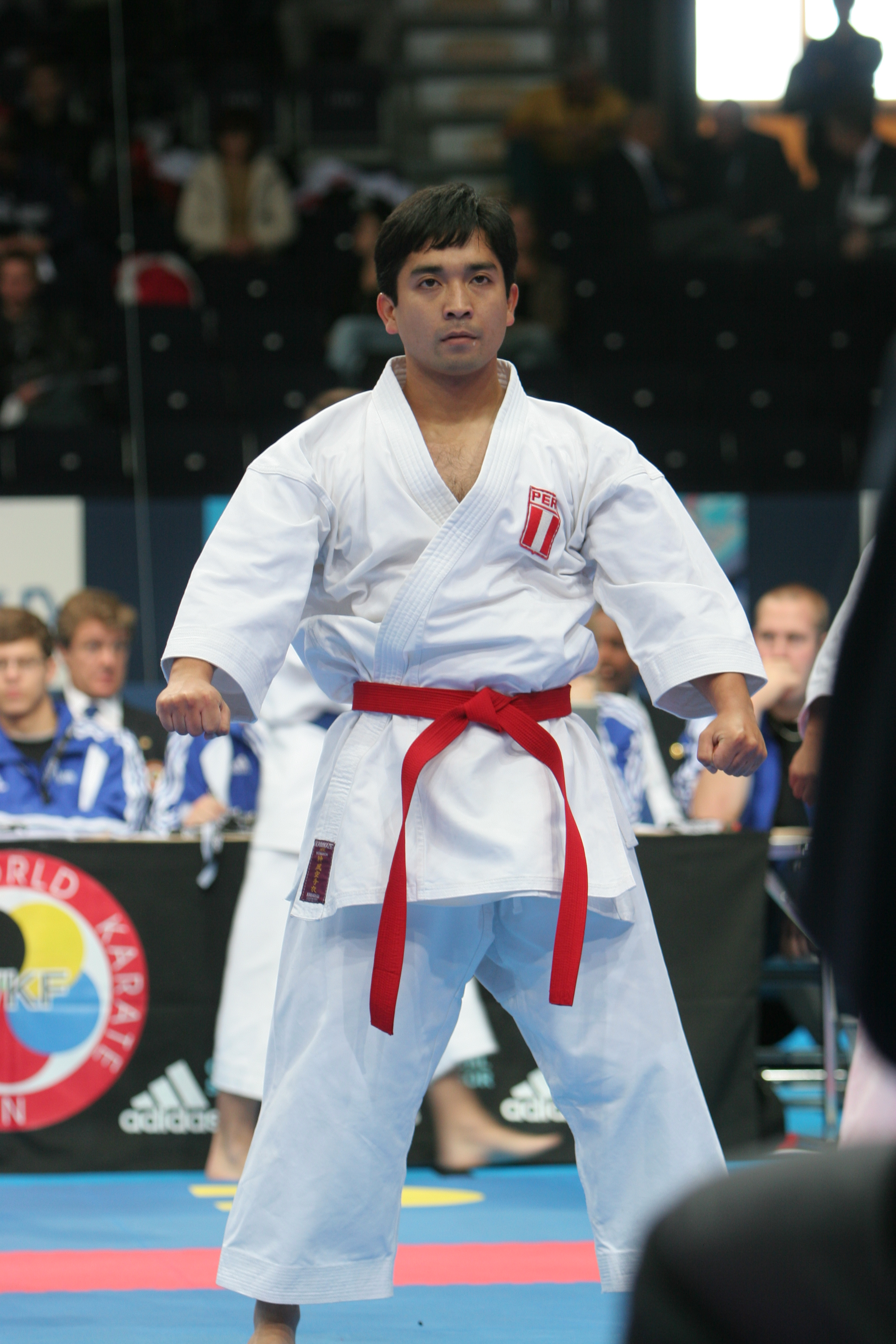
Karateka Akio Tamashiro displaying a karate red belt

A red belt is one of several colored belts used in some martial arts to either denote rank or differentiate opponents in a competition. Like the more commonly known black belt, its use varies between arts, with most using it for the style founder, grandmaster or other high rank, while others use it as the rank immediately prior to a black belt or even to denote a beginner who holds no rank. In some schools, especially those with lineage related to Kodokan judo, a red belt signifies ninth or tenth degree dan rank, the highest ranks attainable.

== In martial arts ==
- In karate, even though grandmasters and non–black belts may both wear a "red belt", the dan rank belts are broader: Kyū (pre–black belt) rank belts normally having a width of 4 centimeters and dan rank belts having a width of 5 centimeters. The grandmaster's red belt is usually darker in color and embroidered with the grandmaster's name and style as customary for dan rank belts.
- In Brazilian jiu-jitsu, the 7th degree black belt is red and black, the 8th degree belt is red and white, and the 9th and 10th degree belts are solid red.
- In judo, at 6th degree (dan) the belt is an alternately red and white belt, and at 9th degree (and above) it is a solid red belt.
- In most Okinawan karate styles and in some schools of kobudo (Okinawan weaponry), the alternately red and white belt is used for seventh and eighth dans, whereas the solid red belt is used for ninth and tenth dans, which are purely honorary, i.e. cannot be attained by applying for (and passing) the respective exam. From seventh dan onwards, a practitioner is allowed to use the title shihan, which translates as "expert examples".
- In modern karate, as governed by the World Karate Federation and its subsidiary federations, red (aka) and blue (ao) belts are worn by competitors. Only red and blue belts are to be worn for competition, with foot and fist pads of the corresponding color for kumite competition. In tournaments sanctioned by the Japan Karate Association (JKA), red (aka) and white (shiro) belts (colors of the Japanese flag) were previously worn. However, this practice has largely been replaced after the 1980s, with both competitors now wearing black belts and the athlete designated as aka wearing a thin red tassel on his/her belt.
- Sambo uses red and blue belts as part of its uniform to differentiate competitors instead of denoting rank.
- Usually in traditional Korean taekwondo, the red belt is just before gaining a first degree black belt, or first dan.
- In tsien tao Chinese kempo, the red belt is equivalent to a sixth degree black belt (first degree master). Stripes are added to the red belt to denote second, and third degree master. A fourth degree master is represented by a red and white striped belt.
- In Seiki Juku karate, a red belt denotes 10th Kyu, the lowest beginner rank.
- In Shorinkan karate the red belt is the highest belt.
- In vovinam, the red belt is the highest master rank.
- In Kyokushin karate, as governed by the International Federation of Karate (IFK), a red belt denotes 10th and 9th kyu, the two lowest ranks after white belt. Despite this, red belts are rare in Kyokushin Karate. Most other Kyokushin organizations and dojos use an orange belt to denote 10th and 9th kyu.

== See also ==
- Black belt (martial arts)
- Red belt (Brazilian jiu-jitsu)
- Kyū
