= Sandbagging (grappling) =

Ranking lower than ones actual ability

Sandbagging is a term used in martial arts to denote a practitioner who competes at a skill-bracket deemed less rigorous than their actual level of competitive ability. The term is adopted similarly in golf and various forms of racing. In contrast to these sports however, it remains unclear whether the grappling "sandbagger" necessarily does so intentionally. For example, in Judo or Brazilian Jiu-Jitsu, where competition is generally divided by belt rank, a practitioner is conventionally not allowed to choose his or her own ranking and thus must compete at a level predetermined by his or her instructor.

== Sandbagging prohibitions ==
Some officiating organizations attempt to proactively curb the occurrence of sandbagging. These actions range from simple rule restrictions, such as the International Brazilian Jiu-Jitsu Federation prohibiting those with a Judo black belt from competing in Brazilian Jiu-Jitsu white belt divisions, to organizations such as the North American Grappling Association employing a special tracking system designed to record competitors nationally and potentially reassign them to a higher skill-level in all the NAGA events.
