= Judogi =

Japanese name for the traditional uniform

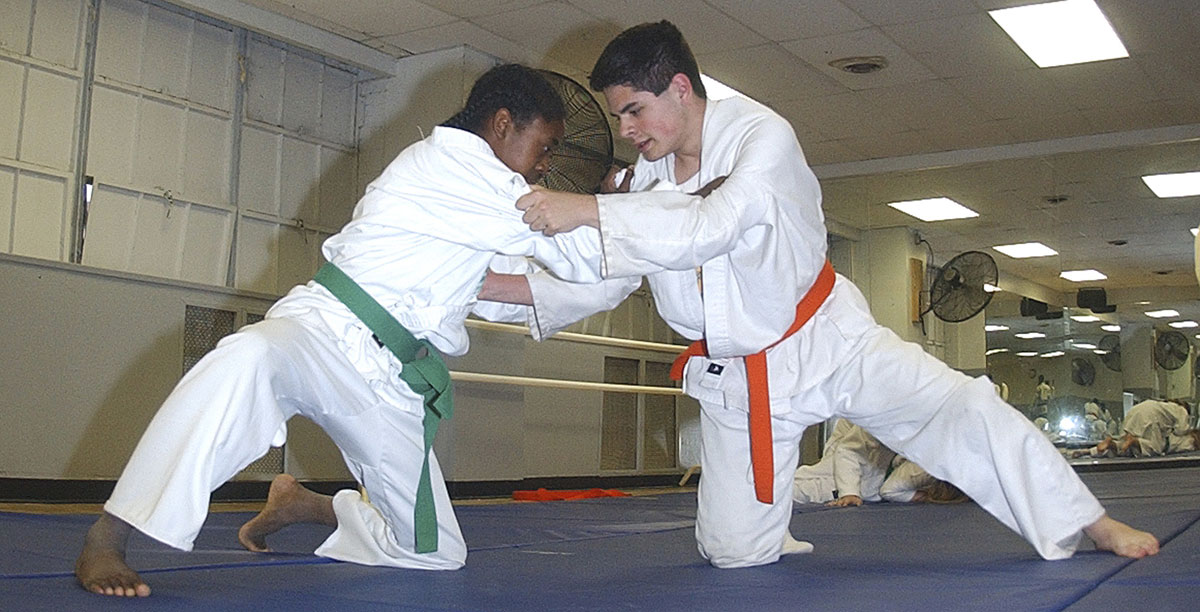
Two judoka wearing judogi

Judogi (柔道着 or 柔道衣), also called keikogi or dogi, is the formal Japanese name for the traditional uniform used for judo practice and competition.

A judogi is somewhat similar to a karategi (空手着 or 空手衣, "karate uniform") as it shares a common origin. Jigoro Kano derived the original judogi from the kimono and other Japanese garments around the turn of the 20th century, and, as such, the judogi was the first modern martial arts training uniform. Over the years, the sleeves and pants have been lengthened, the material and fit have changed, the traditional unbleached cotton is now a bleached white, and blue judogi has become available; nevertheless, the uniform is still very close to that used 100 years ago. Other martial arts, notably karate, later adopted the style of training uniform that is used in Judo.

A judogi comprises three parts that are usually cut from different fabrics: a very heavy jacket (uwagi), lighter canvas pants (shitabaki or zubon), and a cotton belt (obi). Though similar to the shorter styles of kimono, an uwagi will invariably be made from heavy-weight cotton or cotton blend. All but the cheapest and lightest uwagi are cut from woven cotton, similar to, but much more tightly woven than terrycloth. More expensive competition and hand-made judogi will often weigh several kilograms when finished. Due to the nature of judo practice, they commonly have heavier stitching and double-layered knee patches to provide durability. The obi's different colors denote the different ranks in judo.

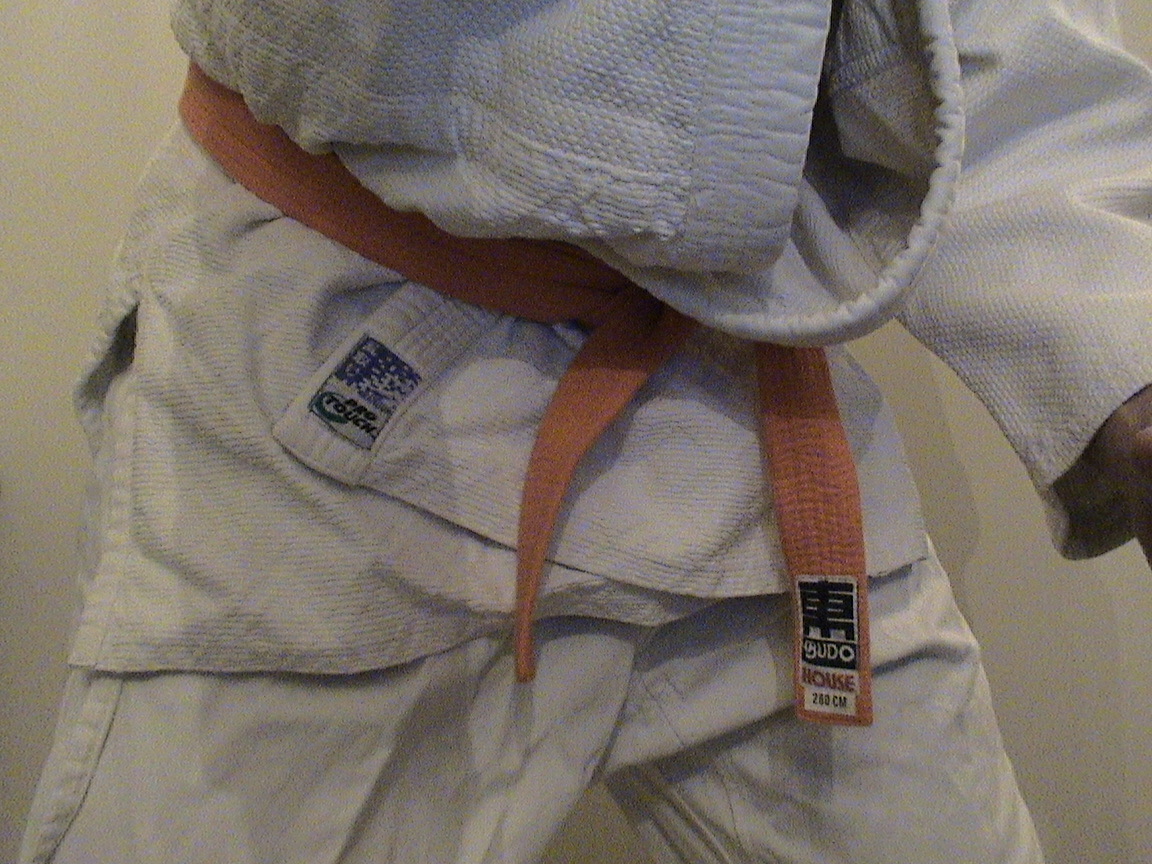
Close up view of a judogi

In competition, judogi sizes and fit are strictly defined by the IJF rules of judo (see below). These rules define sleeve and pant length as well as the looseness of the fit; in competition, the referee can disqualify a competitor for wearing an ill-fitting judogi that may be used for advantage. In addition, various organizations and events oversee such matters as the attachment of commercial and team/national patches and competitors' names. All competitive judogi must be clean and free of holes, tears, or excessive wear.

In official national or international competition only white or blue judogi are allowed. Competitors must have available both colors because one contestant in each match is designated to wear a blue gi while the other wears a white gi. Most judo classes will permit students to wear either color, although white is the traditional color that is often preferred and white fits in better with the traditions of judo and Japanese culture. Less common colors, including red and black, can be found in less formal or specialized situations.

The left side of the gi must cross over the right one.

For IJF competitions judoka had to wear a Judogi with a blue label from January 1, 2011 to March 2015.

For IJF competitions judoka have to wear a Judogi with a red label since April 1, 2015.

== Judogi weights ==
Judogi are sold in many thicknesses, which can be generally grouped together in the two classes: Single-weave and double-weave. Single-weave judogi are thinner and weigh less (upper jacket textile fabric weight usually 300–550 g/m^{2}). The thinner judogi are less durable, although some judoka (judo practitioners) may prefer them for long practices as they are less likely to foster overheating. Double-weave judogi are thicker and weigh more (fabric weight usually 650–1050 g/m^{2}). They are harder to grab than single-weave gis, which is considered an advantage in competition. Double-weave gis shrink less and those of high quality are often sold entirely pre-shrunk, this is important to know when comparing the fit of the gi. Double-weave gis generally cost considerably more than single-weave gis of comparable quality.

Pants by themselves should not be classified as single-weave or double-weave as the name only refers to the weaving style used for the upper section of the jacket. However, pants sold together with double-weave jackets will also tend to be heavier than normal due to stronger fabric or large reinforced sections.

Double-weave jackets designed for competition usually display a prominent seam down the back of the jacket, joining two halves of fabric. Starting in the late nineties, some manufacturers made this overlapping part very wide, in effect doubling the fabric thickness for a large section of the back. This blocked the opponent from gripping there, which in 2005 caused the International Judo Federation to ban the use of a judogi with back seam area wider than 3 cm (a little more than one inch) in international competition. Wider designs could still be permitted in local competitions depending on national rules. Single-weave jackets usually have no back seam, or a narrow one which only joins two fabric sections without interfering with grips.

== See also ==
- Aikidogi
- Brazilian jiu-jitsu gi
- Karate gi
- Keikogi
- Rank in judo
