= Black belt =

Indication of attainment of a high rank of skill in martial arts

- A generic martial arts black belt

Korean name
- Hangul: 검은띠

Japanese name
- Kanji: 黒帯

In East Asian martial arts, the black belt is associated with expertise, but may indicate only competence, depending on the martial art. The use of colored belts is a relatively recent invention dating from the 1880s.

== Origin ==
The systematic use of belt colour to denote rank was first used in Japan by Jigoro Kano, the founder of judo in the 1880s. Previously, Japanese Koryu instructors tended to provide rank certificates only. Initially the wide obi was used. As practitioners trained in a kimono, only white and black obi were used. This kind of ranking is less common in arts that do not claim a far Eastern origin, though it is used in the United States Marine Corps Martial Arts Program.

== Relative rank ==
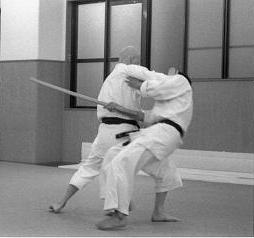
Two aikido black belts training

Rank and belts are not equivalent between arts, styles, or even within some organisations. In some arts, a black belt may be awarded in three years or even less, while in others it takes dedicated training of ten years or more. Testing for black belt is commonly more rigorous and more centralised than for lower grades.

== Ability ==
In contrast to the "black belt as master" stereotype, a black belt commonly indicates the wearer is competent in a style's basic technique and principles.

Another way to describe this links to the terms used in Japanese arts; shodan (for a first degree black belt), means literally the first/beginning step, and the next grades, nidan and sandan are each numbered as ni is two and san is three, meaning second step, third step, etc.

As a "black belt" is commonly viewed as conferring some status, achieving one has been used as a marketing gimmick. For example, a school might guarantee that one will be awarded within a certain period, or for a certain amount of money. Such schools are sometimes referred to as McDojos or belt factories.

=== Teaching ===
In some Japanese schools, after obtaining a black belt the student also begins to instruct, and may be referred to as a senpai (senior student) or sensei (teacher). In others, a black belt student should not be called sensei until they are Sandan (third-degree black belt), or the titles kyosa or sabom in Korean martial arts as a second degree or higher, as this denotes a greater degree of experience and a sensei must have this and grasp of what is involved in teaching a martial art.

== Higher grades ==
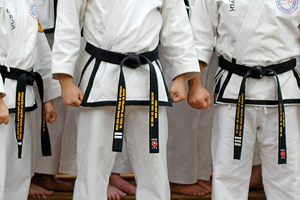
Some martial art schools use embroidered bars to denote different levels of black belt rank, as shown on these taekwondo 1st, 2nd, and 3rd dan black belts.

In Japanese martial arts the further subdivisions of black belt ranks may be linked to dan grades and indicated by 'stripes' on the belt. Yūdansha (roughly translating from Japanese to "person who holds a dan grade") is often used to describe those who hold a black belt rank. While the belt remains black, stripes or other insignia may be added to denote seniority, in some arts, very senior grades will wear differently colored belts.

In judo and some forms of karate, a sixth dan will wear a red-and-white belt. The red-and-white belt is often reserved only for ceremonial occasions, and a regular black belt is still worn during training. At 9th or 10th dan some schools award red. In some schools of jujutsu, the shihan rank and higher wear purple belts. These other colors are often still referred to collectively as "black belts".

== See also ==
- Dan (rank)
- Kyū
- Rank in Judo
- Brazilian jiu-jitsu ranking system
- Gracie jiu-jitsu ranking system
