= Jiu-Jitsu Federation of Guanabara =

Jiu-Jitsu association

The Jiu-Jitsu Federation of Guanabara (Federação de Jiu-Jitsu da Guanabara), located in Rio de Janeiro, was founded in 1967. The federation was established under the authorization of the National Sports Confederation of Brazil. The federation was founded by five founding schools and it was led by Hélio Gracie, Alvaro Barreto, Joao Alberto Barreto, Hélcio Leal Binda, and Oswaldo Fadda.

The president of the Federation was Helio Gracie, and the Chairman of the Advisory Council was Carlos Gracie. His firstborn, Carlson Gracie, was the director of the technical department. The first vice technician was Oswaldo Fadda and the second, Orlando Barradas - both Jiu-Jitsu Professors. Joao Alberto Barreto, outstanding student of the Gracie's, was appointed director of the education department, which had as deputy director Robson Gracie – all now known as great masters of the art.

The Federation of Guanabara was chaired by Hélio Gracie and had sports bases, regulations, etc. The foundation of the Federation was the first step to make the Jiu-Jitsu a sport and not a street fighting art. The art of jiu-jitsu began to have structure and organization. The orders of belt rank tracks were regulated: white, blue, purple, brown, and black. The yellow bands, orange, and green were granted only for children. If the practitioner was greater than 16 years, they would directly be promoted from white to blue. In addition, the rules for any championships that were to occur organized by them were regulated. In the rules, maneuvers like takedowns, mount with both knees on the floor or back with hooks award the competitor points. The duration of the contest in the adult category was five minutes with an extension of three. Jiu-Jitsu officially earned time and scores.

In June 1973, Jiu Jitsu was finally legally recognized as a sport in Brazil and in December 1973, the Federation Jiu-Jitsu Guanabara organized their first championship the “1º Torneio Oficial de Jiu-Jítsu do Brasil” hosted in Rio de Janeiro, at the Athletic Association Bank of Brazil giving the beginning of a new era for Jiu-Jitsu as a sport.

== See also ==
- World Jiu-Jitsu Championship
- Pan-American Championship
- European Open Championship
- Brazilian National Jiu-Jitsu Championship
- BJJ ranking system
- List of Brazilian jiu-jitsu practitioners
