= 2023 Pan Jiu-Jitsu Championship =

Brazilian Jiu-Jitsu competitions held in 2023

- Venue: Silver Spurs Arena
- Location: Kissimmee, Florida
- Dates: 22–26 March 2023
- Website: Pans 2023

The 2023 Pan Jiu-Jitsu Championship was an international jiu-jitsu event, organised by the International Brazilian Jiu-Jitsu Federation (IBJFF), held at the Silver Spurs Arena in Kissimmee, Florida, from 22 to 26 March 2023.

== History ==
The Pan Jiu-Jitsu Championship is the second most important tournament after the World Championship on the IBJJF calendar.

== Medal overview ==
=== Men ===
Adult male black belt results

Division	Gold	Silver	Bronze
-57.5 kg Rooster	(United Arab Emirates) Zayed Alkatheeri; Commando Group	(Japan) Hiryu Niwa; Art of Jiu Jitsu	(Brazil) Jonas Andrade; PSLPB Cicero Costha USA
-57.5 kg Rooster	(United Arab Emirates) Zayed Alkatheeri; Commando Group	(Japan) Hiryu Niwa; Art of Jiu Jitsu	(Mexico) Frank Cespedes; Alliance
-64 kg Light-Feather	(Brazil) Diogo Reis; Fight Sports	(Brazil) Diego Oliveira Batista; Dream Art	(Japan) Yuta Shimada; Alliance
-64 kg Light-Feather	(Brazil) Diogo Reis; Fight Sports	(Brazil) Diego Oliveira Batista; Dream Art	(United States) Zachary Kaina-Kokobun; Art of Jiu Jitsu
-70 kg Feather	(Brazil) Marcio Andre; Nova União	(Brazil) Fabricio Andrey; Melqui Galvão	(Brazil) Alex Sodre; Nova União
-70 kg Feather	(Brazil) Marcio Andre; Nova União	(Brazil) Fabricio Andrey; Melqui Galvão	(Brazil) Diego Sodré; Nova União
-76 kg Light	(Brazil) Johnatha Alves; Art of Jiu Jitsu	Pablo Lavaselli; Art of Jiu Jitsu	(Brazil) Alef Brito; Ares BJJ
-76 kg Light	(Brazil) Johnatha Alves; Art of Jiu Jitsu	Pablo Lavaselli; Art of Jiu Jitsu	(Brazil) Natan Chueng; Fratres Brazilian Jiu-Jitsu
-82.3 kg Middle	(United States) Tainan Dalpra; Art of Jiu Jitsu	(Brazil) Pedro Maia; Escola de Jiu-Jitsu WF	(Brazil) Eduardo Avelar Carvalho; Double Five
-82.3 kg Middle	(United States) Tainan Dalpra; Art of Jiu Jitsu	(Brazil) Pedro Maia; Escola de Jiu-Jitsu WF	(United States) Rolando Samson; Atos Jiu-Jitsu
-88.3 kg Medium-Heavy	(Brazil) Gustavo Batista; Atos Jiu-Jitsu	(Brazil) Jansen Gomes; Checkmat	(Brazil) Francisco Lo; PSLPB Cicero Costha USA
-88.3 kg Medium-Heavy	(Brazil) Gustavo Batista; Atos Jiu-Jitsu	(Brazil) Jansen Gomes; Checkmat	(Brazil) Ronaldo Souza Junior; Atos Jiu-Jitsu
-94.3 kg Heavy	(Poland) Adam Wardzinski; Checkmat	(Brazil) Fellipe Andrew; Alliance Jiu Jitsu	(Brazil) Dimitrius Souza; Alliance Jiu Jitsu
-94.3 kg Heavy	(Poland) Adam Wardzinski; Checkmat	(Brazil) Fellipe Andrew; Alliance Jiu Jitsu	(Brazil) Lucas Lopes; Gracie Barra
-100.5 kg Super-Heavy	(Brazil) Erich Munis; Dream Art	(Brazil) Cassio Sousa; Six Blades Jiu-Jitsu	(Brazil) Davi Cabral; GFTeam
-100.5 kg Super-Heavy	(Brazil) Erich Munis; Dream Art	(Brazil) Cassio Sousa; Six Blades Jiu-Jitsu	(Brazil) Paulo Henrique; Gracie Barra
+100.5 kg kg Ultra-Heavy	(Brazil) Nicholas Meregali; Renzo Gracie	(Brazil) Yatan Bueno; Dream Art	(Brazil) Guilherme Augusto; Alliance Jiu Jitsu
+100.5 kg kg Ultra-Heavy	(Brazil) Nicholas Meregali; Renzo Gracie	(Brazil) Yatan Bueno; Dream Art	(Brazil) Roosevelt Souza; Fight Sports
any weight Open Class	(Brazil) Nicholas Meregali; Dream Art	(Brazil) Erich Munis; Dream Art	(Brazil) Dimitrius Souza; Alliance Jiu Jitsu
any weight Open Class	(Brazil) Nicholas Meregali; Dream Art	(Brazil) Erich Munis; Dream Art	(Brazil) Guilherme Augusto; Alliance Jiu Jitsu

=== Women ===
Adult female black belt results

Division	Gold	Silver	Bronze
-48.5 kg Rooster	(Brazil) Jessica Dantas; R1NG BJJ	(Brazil) Jhenifer Aquino; Atos Jiu-Jitsu	(Brazil) Brenda Larissa; Melqui Galvão Jiu-jitsu
-48.5 kg Rooster	(Brazil) Jessica Dantas; R1NG BJJ	(Brazil) Jhenifer Aquino; Atos Jiu-Jitsu	(Brazil) Maria Duda Tozoni; Kronos BJJ
-53.5 kg Light-Feather	(Brazil) Mayssa Bastos; Unity Jiu Jitsu	(Netherlands) Rose-Marie El Sharouni; Checkmat	(United States) Amanda ‘Tubby’ Alequin; Alliance Jiu Jitsu
-53.5 kg Light-Feather	(Brazil) Mayssa Bastos; Unity Jiu Jitsu	(Netherlands) Rose-Marie El Sharouni; Checkmat	(Brazil) Thamires Aquino; GFTeam
-58.5 kg Feather	(Brazil) Ana Rodrigues; Dream Art	(Italy) Margot Ciccarelli; Art of Jiu Jitsu	(Brazil) Larissa Campos; Gracie Humaita
-58.5 kg Feather	(Brazil) Ana Rodrigues; Dream Art	(Italy) Margot Ciccarelli; Art of Jiu Jitsu	Sophia Dalpra; Art of Jiu Jitsu
-64 kg Light	(Brazil) Luiza Monteiro; Atos Jiu-Jitsu	(Wales) Ffion Davies; Atos Jiu-Jitsu	(Brazil) Janaina Lebre; Gracie Humaita
-64 kg Light	(Brazil) Luiza Monteiro; Atos Jiu-Jitsu	(Wales) Ffion Davies; Atos Jiu-Jitsu	Janine Mutton; Cicero Costha Canada
-69 kg Middle	(United States) Elisabeth Clay; Ares BJJ	(Brazil) Thalyta Silva; Fratres Brazilian Jiu-Jitsu	(Brazil) Thamara Ferreira; Brasa CTA
-69 kg Middle	(United States) Elisabeth Clay; Ares BJJ	(Brazil) Thalyta Silva; Fratres Brazilian Jiu-Jitsu	(United States) Vanessa Griffin; Team Lloyd Irvin
-74 kg Medium-Heavy	(Brazil) Ana Vieira; Aviv Jiu-Jitsu	(United States) Amy Campo; Zenith BJJ	(France) Aurelie Le Vern; Six Blades Jiu-Jitsu
-74 kg Medium-Heavy	(Brazil) Ana Vieira; Aviv Jiu-Jitsu	(United States) Amy Campo; Zenith BJJ	(Brazil) Izadora Cristina; Dream Art
-79.3 kg Heavy	(Brazil) Larissa Dias; MJN Jiu-Jitsu	(Brazil) Ingridd Alves; Dream Art	(Brazil) Amanda Magda; Fratres Brazilian Jiu-Jitsu
-79.3 kg Heavy	(Brazil) Larissa Dias; MJN Jiu-Jitsu	(Brazil) Ingridd Alves; Dream Art	(Brazil) Tamiris Silva; Dream Art
+79.3 kg Super-Heavy	(Brazil) Gabrieli Pessanha; Infight JJ	(Brazil) Mayara Monteiro; CheckMat	(Jordan) Lama Qubbaj; Samy Al Jamal - FIT Jiu-Jitsu
Any weight Open Class	(Brazil) Gabrieli Pessanha; Infight JJ	(Brazil) Ana Vieira; Aviv Jiu-Jitsu	(Poland) Maria Malyjasiak; Abmar Barbosa JJ
Any weight Open Class	(Brazil) Gabrieli Pessanha; Infight JJ	(Brazil) Ana Vieira; Aviv Jiu-Jitsu	(Brazil) Tamiris Silva; Dream Art

== Teams results ==
Results by Academy

Rank	Men's division	
Rank	Team	Points
1	Dream Art	116
2	Atos Jiu-Jitsu	74
3	Alliance Jiu Jitsu	54
4	Art of Jiu Jitsu	14
5	CheckMat	51
6	Renzo Gracie	18
7	Zenith BJJ	12
8	Melqui Galvao JJ	12
9	Nova União	33
10	G13 BJJ USA	10

Rank	Women's division	
Rank	Team	Points
1	Dream Art	89
2	GFTeam	44
3	Atos Jiu-Jitsu	29
4	Unity Jiu Jitsu	25
5	Nova União	23
6	Barbosa Jiu Jitsu	22
7	Infight JJ	18
8	Alliance	16
9	CheckMat	15
10	Carlson Gracie Team	14

== See also ==
- Pan Jiu-Jitsu Championship
- World Jiu-Jitsu Championship
- European IBJJF Jiu-Jitsu Championship
