= 2022 World Jiu-Jitsu Championship =

Brazilian Jiu-Jitsu competitions

- Venue: Walter Pyramid, (CSU)
- Location: (United States) Long Beach, California
- Dates: 2–5 June 2022
- Website: IBJJF

The 2022 IBJJF World Jiu-Jitsu Championship was an international jiu-jitsu event organised by the International Brazilian Jiu-Jitsu Federation (IBJFF) and held at the California State University, Long Beach in California from 2 to 5 June 2022.

== Men's medallists ==
Adult male black belt results

Division	Gold	Silver	Bronze
Rooster (57.5 kg)	(Brazil) Thalison Soares; Art of Jiu Jitsu	(Brazil) Carlos Alberto Oliveira; GFTeam	(Brazil) Cleber Sousa; Atos Jiu-Jitsu
Rooster (57.5 kg)	(Brazil) Thalison Soares; Art of Jiu Jitsu	(Brazil) Carlos Alberto Oliveira; GFTeam	(Brazil) Rodnei Barbosa; Qatar BJJ Brasil
Light-feather (64 kg)	(Brazil) Meyram Maquiné; Dream Art	(Brazil) Diego Oliveira Batista; Dream Art	(Brazil) Diogo Reis; Fight Sports
Light-feather (64 kg)	(Brazil) Meyram Maquiné; Dream Art	(Brazil) Diego Oliveira Batista; Dream Art	(Brazil) Hiago George; Cicero Costha Internacional
Feather (70 kg)	(United States) Isaac Doederlein; Alliance	(Brazil) Diego Sodré; Nova União	(Brazil) Daniel Maira; Movement Art
Feather (70 kg)	(United States) Isaac Doederlein; Alliance	(Brazil) Diego Sodré; Nova União	(Brazil) Samuel Nagai Hatchwell; CheckMat
Light (76 kg)	(United States) Tye Ruotolo (Note: Micael Galvâo was stripped of his world title following a positive drug test and Rutolo declared world champion.); Atos Jiu-Jitsu	(Brazil) Jonnatas Gracie; Atos Jiu-Jitsu	(Brazil) Matheus Pinheiro; CheckMat
Light (76 kg)	(United States) Tye Ruotolo; Atos Jiu-Jitsu	(Brazil) Jonnatas Gracie; Atos Jiu-Jitsu	(Brazil) Lucas Valente; Gracie Barra
Middle (82.3 kg)	(Brazil) Tainan Dalpra; Art of Jiu Jitsu	(Brazil) Andy Murasaki; Atos Jiu-Jitsu	(Brazil) Ronaldo Pereira Junior; Atos Jiu-Jitsu
Middle (82.3 kg)	(Brazil) Tainan Dalpra; Art of Jiu Jitsu	(Brazil) Andy Murasaki; Atos Jiu-Jitsu	(Norway) Tommy Langaker; Nova União
Medium-Heavy (88.3 kg)	(Brazil) Leandro Lo; Ns Brotherhood	(Brazil) Isaque Bahiense; Dream Art	(Brazil) Bruno Lima; AMA Jiu-Jitsu Team
Medium-Heavy (88.3 kg)	(Brazil) Leandro Lo; Ns Brotherhood	(Brazil) Isaque Bahiense; Dream Art	(Brazil) Gustavo Batista; Atos Jiu-Jitsu
Heavy (94.3 kg)	(Brazil) Kaynan Duarte; Atos Jiu-Jitsu	(Brazil) Dimitrius Soares; Alliance	(Brazil) Pedro Machado; Atos Jiu-Jitsu
Heavy (94.3 kg)	(Brazil) Kaynan Duarte; Atos Jiu-Jitsu	(Brazil) Dimitrius Soares; Alliance	(Brazil) Rider Zuchi; Ns Brotherhood
Super-Heavy (100.5 kg)	(Brazil) Erich Munis; Dream Art	(Brazil) Nicholas Meregali; Dream Art	(Brazil) Fellipe Andrew; Alliance
Super-Heavy (100.5 kg)	(Brazil) Erich Munis; Dream Art	(Brazil) Nicholas Meregali; Dream Art	(Brazil) Marcus Ribeiro; Alliance
Ultra-Heavy (over 100.5 kg)	(Brazil) Victor Hugo; Six Blades Jiu-Jitsu	(Brazil) Gutemberg Pereira; GFTeam	(Brazil) Guilherme Augusto; Alliance Jiu Jitsu
Ultra-Heavy (over 100.5 kg)	(Brazil) Victor Hugo; Six Blades Jiu-Jitsu	(Brazil) Gutemberg Pereira; GFTeam	(Brazil) Wallace Costa; GFTeam
Open Class (any weight divisions)	(Brazil) Nicholas Meregali; Dream Art	(Brazil) Erich Munis; Dream Art	(Brazil) Fellipe Andrew; Alliance
Open Class (any weight divisions)	(Brazil) Nicholas Meregali; Dream Art	(Brazil) Erich Munis; Dream Art	(Brazil) Gustavo Batista; Atos Jiu-Jitsu

== Women's medallists ==
Adult female black belt results

Division	Gold	Silver	Bronze
Rooster (48.5 kg)	(Brazil) Mayssa Bastos; GFTeam	(Brazil) Brenda Larissa; Fight Sports	(Brazil) Jhenifer Aquino; Atos Jiu-Jitsu
Rooster (48.5 kg)	(Brazil) Mayssa Bastos; GFTeam	(Brazil) Brenda Larissa; Fight Sports	(Italy) Serena Gabrielli; Flow
Light-feather (53.5 kg)	(Brazil) Ana Rodrigues; Dream Art	(Brazil) Tammi Musumeci; Pedigo Submission Fighting	(Netherlands) Rose-Marie El Sharouni; Checkmat
Light-feather (53.5 kg)	(Brazil) Ana Rodrigues; Dream Art	(Brazil) Tammi Musumeci; Pedigo Submission Fighting	(Brazil) Thamires Aquino; GFTeam
Feather (58.5 kg)	(Brazil) Bianca Basílio; Atos Jiu-Jitsu	(Brazil) Amanda Monteiro; GFTeam	(Brazil) Gabriela Pereira; Qatar BJJ / Vision Brasil
Feather (58.5 kg)	(Brazil) Bianca Basílio; Atos Jiu-Jitsu	(Brazil) Amanda Monteiro; GFTeam	(Brazil) Gabriela Fechter; CheckMat
Light (64 kg)	(Wales) Ffion Davies; Atos Jiu-Jitsu	(Brazil) Janaina Maia; Gracie Humaita	(Italy) Margot Ciccarelli; Unity Jiu-jitsu
Light (64 kg)	(Wales) Ffion Davies; Atos Jiu-Jitsu	(Brazil) Janaina Maia; Gracie Humaita	(Brazil) Nathalie Ribeiro; Checkmat
Middle (69 kg)	(Brazil) Andressa Cintra; Gracie Barra	(Brazil) Thalyta Lima; Qatar BJJ / Vision	(United States) Chloé McNally; Unity Jiu-jitsu
Middle (69 kg)	(Brazil) Andressa Cintra; Gracie Barra	(Brazil) Thalyta Lima; Qatar BJJ / Vision	(Brazil) Thamara Ferreira; Guigo JJ
Medium-Heavy (74 kg)	(Brazil) Ana Carolina Vieira; Aviv Jiu-Jitsu	(Brazil) Luciana Mota; Alliance Jiu-Jitsu	(Brazil) Fernanda Cristo; Evox BJJ
Medium-Heavy (74 kg)	(Brazil) Ana Carolina Vieira; Aviv Jiu-Jitsu	(Brazil) Luciana Mota; Alliance Jiu-Jitsu	(Brazil) Ingridd Alves; Guigo JJ
Heavy (79.3 kg)	(Brazil) Larissa Dias; MJN	(Brazil) Rafaela Guedes; Atos Jiu-Jitsu	(Brazil) Fernanda Mazzelli; Striker JJ
Heavy (79.3 kg)	(Brazil) Larissa Dias; MJN	(Brazil) Rafaela Guedes; Atos Jiu-Jitsu	(Brazil) Melissa Cueto; Alliance Jiu Jitsu
Super-Heavy (over 79.3 kg)	(Brazil) Gabrieli Pessanha; Infight JJ	(Brazil) Yara Soares; Dream Art	Claire-France Thevenon; Panda Supa Crew
Super-Heavy (over 79.3 kg)	(Brazil) Gabrieli Pessanha; Infight JJ	(Brazil) Yara Soares; Dream Art	(Brazil) Mayara Custódio; CheckMat
Open Class (any weight divisions)	(Brazil) Gabrieli Pessanha; Infight JJ	(United States) Amy Campo; Zenith BJJ	(Brazil) Ana Carolina Vieira; Aviv Jiu-Jitsu
Open Class (any weight divisions)	(Brazil) Gabrieli Pessanha; Infight JJ	(United States) Amy Campo; Zenith BJJ	(Brazil) Rafaela Guedes; Atos Jiu-Jitsu

== Teams results ==
Results by Academy

Rank	Men's division	
Rank	Team	Points
1	Alliance	101
2	Dream Art	84
3	Atos Jiu-Jitsu	56
4	Art of Jiu Jitsu	35
5	CheckMat	30
6	Gracie Barra	29
7	Nova União	25
8	GFTeam	17
9	Cicero Costha Internacional	14
10	Team Lloyd Irvin	12

Rank	Women's division	
Rank	Team	Points
1	Dream Art	62
2	Atos Jiu-Jitsu	48
3	Alliance	39
4	GFTeam	36
5	Infight JJ	28
6	CheckMat	27
7	Unity Jiu-jitsu	24
8	Gracie Barra	23
9	Six Blades Jiu-Jitsu	19
10	Qatar BJJ / Vision Brasil	19

== See also ==
- World IBJJF Jiu-Jitsu Championship
- European IBJJF Jiu-Jitsu Championship
- Pan IBJJF Jiu-Jitsu Championship
