= 2023 World Jiu-Jitsu Championship =

Brazilian Jiu-Jitsu competition

- Venue: Walter Pyramid, (CSU)
- Location: Long Beach, California
- Dates: 1–4 Jun 2023
- Website: IBJJF

The 2023 IBJJF World Jiu-Jitsu Championship was an international Brazilian jiu-jitsu event organised by the International Brazilian Jiu-Jitsu Federation (IBJFF) and held at the California State University, Long Beach in California from 1 to 4 Jun 2023.

== History ==
The World Jiu-Jitsu Championship is known as the most important Brazilian jiu-jitsu tournament of the year on the IBJJF calendar.

== Medal overview ==
=== Men ===
Adult male black belt results

Division	Gold	Silver	Bronze
Rooster -57.5 kg (127 lb)	(Brazil) Lucas Pinheiro; Atos Jiu-Jitsu	(Brazil) Thalison Soares; Art of Jiu Jitsu	(Brazil) Carlos Alberto Oliveira; GFTeam
Rooster -57.5 kg (127 lb)	(Brazil) Lucas Pinheiro; Atos Jiu-Jitsu	(Brazil) Thalison Soares; Art of Jiu Jitsu	(Brazil) Roiter Lima; Gracie Barra
Light-feather -64 kg (141 lb)	(Brazil) Diego Oliveira Batista; Art of Jiu Jitsu	(Brazil) Meyram Maquiné; Fratres Brazilian Jiu-Jitsu	(Brazil) Cleber Sousa; Atos Jiu-Jitsu
Light-feather -64 kg (141 lb)	(Brazil) Diego Oliveira Batista; Art of Jiu Jitsu	(Brazil) Meyram Maquiné; Fratres Brazilian Jiu-Jitsu	(Brazil) Diogo Reis; Melqui Galvão Jiu-jitsu
Feather -70 kg (150 lb)	(Brazil) Samuel Nagai Hatchwell; CheckMat	(Brazil) Diego Sodré; Nova União	(Brazil) Fabricio Andrey; Melqui Galvão
Feather -70 kg (150 lb)	(Brazil) Samuel Nagai Hatchwell; CheckMat	(Brazil) Diego Sodré; Nova União	(United States) Isaac Doederlein; Alliance
Light -76 kg (168 lb)	(Brazil) Johnatha Alves; Art of Jiu Jitsu	(Brazil) Pedro Maia; Escola de Jiu-Jitsu WF	(Brazil) Jackson Nagai; CheckMat
Light -76 kg (168 lb)	(Brazil) Johnatha Alves; Art of Jiu Jitsu	(Brazil) Pedro Maia; Escola de Jiu-Jitsu WF	(Brazil) Murilo Amaral; Alliance
Middleweight -82 kg (181 lb)	(Brazil) Jansen Gomes; Checkmat	(Brazil) Tainan Dalpra; Art of Jiu Jitsu	(United States) Rolando Samson; Atos Jiu-Jitsu
Middleweight -82 kg (181 lb)	(Brazil) Jansen Gomes; Checkmat	(Brazil) Tainan Dalpra; Art of Jiu Jitsu	(United States) Tye Ruotolo; Atos Jiu-Jitsu
Medium-heavyweight -88 kg (194 lb)	(Brazil) Gustavo Batista; Atos Jiu-Jitsu	(Brazil) Andy Murasaki; Atos Jiu-Jitsu	(Brazil) Isaque Bahiense; Dream Art
Medium-heavyweight -88 kg (194 lb)	(Brazil) Gustavo Batista; Atos Jiu-Jitsu	(Brazil) Andy Murasaki; Atos Jiu-Jitsu	(Costa Rica) Sebastian Rodriguez; Unity
Heavyweight -94 kg (207 lb)	(Brazil) Fellipe Andrew; Alliance	(Brazil) Pedro Machado; Atos Jiu-Jitsu	(Brazil) Dimitrius Souza; Alliance Jiu Jitsu
Heavyweight -94 kg (207 lb)	(Brazil) Fellipe Andrew; Alliance	(Brazil) Pedro Machado; Atos Jiu-Jitsu	(Brazil) Rider Zuchi; Fratres Brazilian Jiu-Jitsu
Super-heavyweight -100 kg (220 lb)	(Brazil) Erich Munis; Fratres Brazilian Jiu-Jitsu	(Brazil) Kaynan Duarte; Atos Jiu-Jitsu	(Brazil) Cássio Felipe Costa; Six Blades Jiu-Jitsu
Super-heavyweight -100 kg (220 lb)	(Brazil) Erich Munis; Fratres Brazilian Jiu-Jitsu	(Brazil) Kaynan Duarte; Atos Jiu-Jitsu	(Brazil) Gutemberg Pereira; GFTeam
Ultra-heavyweight +100 kg (220 lb)	(Brazil) Victor Hugo; Six Blades Jiu-Jitsu	(Brazil) Marcus Ribeiro; Alliance	(Denmark) Alexander Trans; GFTeam International
Ultra-heavyweight +100 kg (220 lb)	(Brazil) Victor Hugo; Six Blades Jiu-Jitsu	(Brazil) Marcus Ribeiro; Alliance	(Brazil) Guilherme Augusto; Alliance Jiu Jitsu
Absolute; Openweight	(Brazil) Victor Hugo; Six Blades Jiu-Jitsu	(Brazil) Erich Munis; Fratres Brazilian Jiu-Jitsu	(Brazil) Kaynan Duarte; Atos Jiu-Jitsu
Absolute; Openweight	(Brazil) Victor Hugo; Six Blades Jiu-Jitsu	(Brazil) Erich Munis; Fratres Brazilian Jiu-Jitsu	(Brazil) Paulo Henrique; Gracie Barra

=== Women ===
Adult female black belt results

Division	Gold	Silver	Bronze
Rooster -48.5 kg (107 lb)	(Brazil) Mayssa Bastos; Art of Jiu Jitsu	(Brazil) Jhenifer Aquino; Atos Jiu-Jitsu	(Brazil) Brenda Larissa; Melqui Galvão Jiu-jitsu
Rooster -48.5 kg (107 lb)	(Brazil) Mayssa Bastos; Art of Jiu Jitsu	(Brazil) Jhenifer Aquino; Atos Jiu-Jitsu	(Brazil) Mariana Rolszt; Gracie Humaitá
Light-feather -53.5 kg (118 lb)	(United States) Jessa Khan; Art of Jiu Jitsu	(Brazil) Thamires Aquino; GFTeam	(Brazil) Jessica Dantas; R1NG BJJ
Light-feather -53.5 kg (118 lb)	(United States) Jessa Khan; Art of Jiu Jitsu	(Brazil) Thamires Aquino; GFTeam	(Netherlands) Rose El Sharouni; CheckMat
Feather -58.5 kg (129 lb)	(Brazil) Bianca Basílio; Atos Jiu-Jitsu	(Brazil) Ana Rodrigues; Dream Art	(Brazil) Gabriela Pereira; Qatar BJJ / Vision Brasil
Feather -58.5 kg (129 lb)	(Brazil) Bianca Basílio; Atos Jiu-Jitsu	(Brazil) Ana Rodrigues; Dream Art	(Italy) Margot Ciccarelli; Art of Jiu Jitsu
Light -64 kg (141 lb)	(Wales) Ffion Davies; Atos Jiu-Jitsu	(Brazil) Janaina Maia de Menezes; Gracie Humaita	(Canada) Brianna Ste-Marie; Brazilian Top Team
Light -64 kg (141 lb)	(Wales) Ffion Davies; Atos Jiu-Jitsu	(Brazil) Janaina Maia de Menezes; Gracie Humaita	(Brazil) Luciane Silva; Checkmat
Middleweight -69 kg (152 lb)	(Brazil) Andressa Cintra; Gracie Barra	(Brazil) Thalyta Lima; Fratres Brazilian Jiu-Jitsu	(Brazil) Thamara Ferreira; Brasa CTA
Middleweight -69 kg (152 lb)	(Brazil) Andressa Cintra; Gracie Barra	(Brazil) Thalyta Lima; Fratres Brazilian Jiu-Jitsu	(United States) Vannessa Griffin; Team Lloyd Irvin
Medium-heavyweight -74 kg (163 lb)	(United States) Amy Campo; Zenith BJJ	(Poland) Maria Malyjasiak; Abmar Barbosa Association	(Brazil) Ana Carolina Vieira; Aviv Jiu-Jitsu
Medium-heavyweight -74 kg (163 lb)	(United States) Amy Campo; Zenith BJJ	(Poland) Maria Malyjasiak; Abmar Barbosa Association	(France) Aurelie Le Vern; Six Blades Jiu-Jitsu
Heavyweight -79.3 kg (175 lb)	(Brazil) Melissa Cueto; Alliance	(Brazil) Larissa Dias; R1NG BJJ	(Brazil) Nathiely de Jesus; Rodrigo Pinheiro BJJ
Heavyweight -79.3 kg (175 lb)	(Brazil) Melissa Cueto; Alliance	(Brazil) Larissa Dias; R1NG BJJ	(Brazil) Tamiris Fernanda; Dream Art
Super-heavyweight +79.3 kg (175 lb)	(Brazil) Gabrieli Pessanha; Infight JJ	(Brazil) Mayara Custódio; CheckMat	(Brazil) Amanda Magda; Fratres Brazilian Jiu-Jitsu
Super-heavyweight +79.3 kg (175 lb)	(Brazil) Gabrieli Pessanha; Infight JJ	(Brazil) Mayara Custódio; CheckMat	Claire-France Thévenon; IFT
Absolute; Openweight	(Brazil) Gabrieli Pessanha; Infight JJ	(Brazil) Ana Carolina Vieira; Aviv Jiu-Jitsu	(United States) Amy Campo; Zenith BJJ
Absolute; Openweight	(Brazil) Gabrieli Pessanha; Infight JJ	(Brazil) Ana Carolina Vieira; Aviv Jiu-Jitsu	(Brazil) Melissa Cueto; Alliance

== Teams results ==
Results by Academy

Rank	Men's division	
Rank	Team	Points
1	DreamArt	105
2	Alliance	89
3	Atos Jiu-Jitsu	87
4	Art of Jiu Jitsu	46
5	Checkmat	43
6	Fratres Brazilian Jiu-Jitsu	26
7	Qatar BJJ / Vision Brasil	22
8	Six Blades Jiu-Jitsu	21
9	GFTeam	16
10	Nova União	13

Rank	Women's division	
Rank	Team	Points
1	DreamArt	67
2	GFTeam	64
3	Checkmat	38
4	Atos Jiu-Jitsu	36
5	Alliance	29
6	Art of Jiu Jitsu	28
7	Gracie Barra	28
8	LEAD BJJ	22
9	Nova União	22
10	Infight JJ	18

== Prize money ==
Black belt champions from rooster to ultra-heavyweight were awarded between $5,000 and $8,000, depending on their ranking points. Open class champions were awarded $15,000.

Black belt adult – Rooster to Ultra Heavy
Athletes in Division	2–8	9–16	17–32	33+
Champion	$5,000.00 (USD)	$6,000.00 (USD)	$7,000.00 (USD)	$8,000.00 (USD)

Black belt adult – Open Class
Athletes in Division	OPEN
Champion	$15,000.00 (USD)

== See also ==
- World IBJJF Jiu-Jitsu Championship
- European IBJJF Jiu-Jitsu Championship
- Pan IBJJF Jiu-Jitsu Championship
