= 2022 Pan Jiu-Jitsu Championship =

Brazilian Jiu-Jitsu competitions

- Venue: Silver Spurs Arena
- Location: Kissimmee, Florida
- Dates: 6-10 April 2022
- Competitors: 4,800
- Website: IBJJF

The 2022 Pan Jiu-Jitsu Championship was an international jiu-jitsu event, organised by the International Brazilian Jiu-Jitsu Federation (IBJFF), held at the Silver Spurs Arena in Kissimmee, Florida, from 6-10 April 2022.

== History ==
The Pan Jiu-Jitsu Championship is considered the second most important tournament after the world championship on the IBJJF calendar. The 2022 edition drew more than 4,800 athletes and was the largest Pan jiu-jitsu championship to date.

== Medal overview ==
=== Men ===
Adult male black belt results

Division	Gold	Silver	Bronze
-57.5 kg Rooster	(Brazil) Carlos Silva; GFTeam	(Brazil) Thalison Soares; The Academy Byron Bay	(United States) Estevan Martinez; ZR Team NC
-57.5 kg Rooster	(Brazil) Carlos Silva; GFTeam	(Brazil) Thalison Soares; The Academy Byron Bay	(Mexico) Frank Cespedes; Alliance
-64 kg Light-Feather	(Brazil) Meyram Maquiné; Dream Art	(Brazil) Lucas dos Santos Pinheiro; Atos Jiu-Jitsu	(Brazil) Hiago George; Cicero Costha Internacional
-64 kg Light-Feather	(Brazil) Meyram Maquiné; Dream Art	(Brazil) Lucas dos Santos Pinheiro; Atos Jiu-Jitsu	(Japan) Tomoyuki Hashimoto; Brasa CTA
-70 kg Feather	(Brazil) Alexssandro Sodré; Nova União	(Brazil) Diego Sodre; Nova União	(Brazil) Richar Nogueira; Rodrigo Pinheiro BJJ
-70 kg Feather	(Brazil) Alexssandro Sodré; Nova União	(Brazil) Diego Sodre; Nova União	(Brazil) Thiago Macedo; Rodrigo Pinheiro BJJ
-76 kg Light	(Brazil) Johnatha Alves; Art of Jiu Jitsu	(Brazil) Andy Murasaki; Atos Jiu-Jitsu	(Brazil) Igor Feliz; R1NG BJJ
-76 kg Light	(Brazil) Johnatha Alves; Art of Jiu Jitsu	(Brazil) Andy Murasaki; Atos Jiu-Jitsu	(Brazil) Natan Chueng; Cicero Costha Internacional
-82.3 kg Middle	(Brazil) Tainan Dalpra; Art of Jiu Jitsu	(Brazil) Jeferson Guaresi; Unity Jiu Jitsu	(Brazil) Mathias Luna; CheckMat
-82.3 kg Middle	(Brazil) Tainan Dalpra; Art of Jiu Jitsu	(Brazil) Jeferson Guaresi; Unity Jiu Jitsu	(Brazil) Ronaldo Souza Júnior; Atos Jiu-Jitsu
-88.3 kg Medium-Heavy	(Costa Rica) Sebastian Rodriguez; Unity Jiu Jitsu	(Brazil) Manuel Ribamar; Rodrigo Pinheiro BJJ	(Brazil) Leandro Lo; Unity Jiu Jitsu
-88.3 kg Medium-Heavy	(Costa Rica) Sebastian Rodriguez; Unity Jiu Jitsu	(Brazil) Manuel Ribamar; Rodrigo Pinheiro BJJ	(Brazil) Yan Lucas; Six Blades Jiu-Jitsu
-94.3 kg Heavy	(Brazil) Dimitrius Souza; Alliance	(Brazil) Matheus Diniz; Alliance	(Brazil) Pedro Marinho; Gracie Barra
-94.3 kg Heavy	(Brazil) Dimitrius Souza; Alliance	(Brazil) Matheus Diniz; Alliance	(Brazil) Pedro Machado; R1NG BJJ
-100.5 kg Super-Heavy	(Brazil) Marcus Ribeiro; Alliance International	(Brazil) Erich Munis dos Santos; Dream Artv	(Brazil) Fellipe Andrew; Alliance
-100.5 kg Super-Heavy	(Brazil) Marcus Ribeiro; Alliance International	(Brazil) Erich Munis dos Santos; Dream Artv	(Brazil) Vinicius Ferreira; Alliance
+100.5 kg kg Ultra-Heavy	(United States) Roberto Abreu; Fight Sports	(Brazil) Gutemberg Pereira; GFTeam	(Brazil) Davi Cabral; GFTeam International
+100.5 kg kg Ultra-Heavy	(United States) Roberto Abreu; Fight Sports	(Brazil) Gutemberg Pereira; GFTeam	(Brazil) Roosevelt Souza; Fight Sports
any weight Open Class	(Brazil) Erich Munis; Dream Art	(Brazil) Fellipe Andrew; Alliance	(Brazil) Roosevelt Souza; Fight Sports
any weight Open Class	(Brazil) Erich Munis; Dream Art	(Brazil) Fellipe Andrew; Alliance	(Brazil) Wallace Costa; GFTeam

=== Women ===
Adult female black belt results

Division	Gold	Silver	Bronze
-48.5 kg Rooster	(Brazil) Mayssa Bastos; Unity Jiu Jitsu	(Brazil) Lavínia Barbosa; CheckMat	(Brazil) Jhenifer Aquino; Atos Jiu-Jitsu
-48.5 kg Rooster	(Brazil) Mayssa Bastos; Unity Jiu Jitsu	(Brazil) Lavínia Barbosa; CheckMat	(United States) Kaori Hernandez; Unique Logic Jiu-Jitsu HQ
-53.5 kg Light-Feather	(United States) Jessa Khan; Art of Jiu Jitsu	(Brazil) Thamires Aquino; GFTeam	(Brazil) Andreza Morais; Ares BJJ
-53.5 kg Light-Feather	(United States) Jessa Khan; Art of Jiu Jitsu	(Brazil) Thamires Aquino; GFTeam	(United States) Sofia Amarante; JJ4L
-58.5 kg Feather	(Brazil) Ana Rodrigues; Dream Art	(Brazil) Amanda Monteiro; GFTeam	(Brazil) Larissa Campos; Gracie Humaita Reunion
-58.5 kg Feather	(Brazil) Ana Rodrigues; Dream Art	(Brazil) Amanda Monteiro; GFTeam	(Brazil) Sophia Marie Dalpra; Art of Jiu Jitsu
-64 kg Light	(United States) Nathalie Ribeiro; Checkmat	(Wales) Ffion Davies; ECJJA	(United States) Janaina Maia de Menezes; Gracie Humaita San Diego
-64 kg Light	(United States) Nathalie Ribeiro; Checkmat	(Wales) Ffion Davies; ECJJA	(Italy) Margot Ciccarelli; Unity Jiu Jitsu
-69 kg Middle	(Brazil) Thamara Ferreira; Guigo JJ	(United States) Chloé McNally; Unity Jiu Jitsu	(Brazil) Natália Zumba; Alliance
-69 kg Middle	(Brazil) Thamara Ferreira; Guigo JJ	(United States) Chloé McNally; Unity Jiu Jitsu	(United States) Vanessa Griffin; Team Lloyd Irvin
-74 kg Medium-Heavy	(Poland) Maria Malyjasiak; Abmar Barbosa Association	(Brazil) Izadora Cristina; Dream Art	(Brazil) Fernanda Cristo; Evox BJJ
-74 kg Medium-Heavy	(Poland) Maria Malyjasiak; Abmar Barbosa Association	(Brazil) Izadora Cristina; Dream Art	(United States) Vedha Clemente Toscano; CheckMat
-79.3 kg Heavy	(Brazil) Melissa Cueto; Alliance	(United States) Maggie Grindatti; Fight Sports	(United States) Elizabeth Foster; Alliance
-79.3 kg Heavy	(Brazil) Melissa Cueto; Alliance	(United States) Maggie Grindatti; Fight Sports	(Brazil) Larissa Dias; MJN Jiu-Jitsu
+79.3 kg Super-Heavy	(Brazil) Gabrieli Pessanha; Infight JJ	(Brazil) Yara Soares; Dream Art	(Brazil) Mayara Custódio; CheckMat
Any weight Open Class	(Brazil) Gabrieli Pessanha; Infight JJ	(Brazil) Yara Soares; Dream Art	(Poland) Maria Malyjasiak; Abmar Barbosa Association
Any weight Open Class	(Brazil) Gabrieli Pessanha; Infight JJ	(Brazil) Yara Soares; Dream Art	(Brazil) Melissa Cueto; Alliance

== Teams results ==
Results by Academy

Rank	Men's division	
Rank	Team	Points
1	Atos Jiu-Jitsu	79
2	Dream Art	74
3	Alliance Jiu Jitsu	43
4	CheckMat	39
5	Nova União	30
6	Cicero Costha Internacional	29
7	Art of Jiu Jitsu	25
8	Unity Jiu Jitsu	23
9	GFTeam	18
10	R1NG BJJ	16

Rank	Women's division	
Rank	Team	Points
1	Dream Art	60
2	CheckMat	35
3	Infight JJ	27
4	Alliance	27
5	Unity Jiu Jitsu	25
6	Six Blades Jiu-Jitsu	23
7	Gracie Barra	22
8	GFTeam	20
9	Art of Jiu Jitsu	19
10	Daniel Gracie Academy	18

== See also ==
- Pan Jiu-Jitsu Championship
- World Jiu-Jitsu Championship
- European IBJJF Jiu-Jitsu Championship
