= 2023 Brazilian Jiu-Jitsu European Championship =

Brazilian jiu-jitsu competition

- Venue: Institut du Judo
- Location: Paris, France
- Dates: 23–29 January 2023
- Website: IBJJF 2023 European Open

The 2023 Brazilian Jiu-Jitsu European Championship, officially called the 2023 European Jiu-Jitsu IBJFF Championship, was an international jiu-jitsu tournament organised in Europe by the International Brazilian Jiu-Jitsu Federation (IBJFF). It was held between 23 and 29 January 2023 in Paris, France.

== Location ==
Paris was selected as the host city for the first time as the European championship was held in Lisbon, Portugal until 2019 and in Rome in 2022. (Note: No European championship took place in 2021 due to the COVID-19 pandemic.)

== Schedule ==
Pre schedule:

Monday 23rd	Tuesday 24th	Wednesday 25th	Thursday 26th	Friday 27th	Saturday 28th	Sunday 29th
White Adult	White Adult	Blue Adult	Purple Adult	Purple Adult	White Juvenile	Brown Adult
White Master 1 2 3 4 5	White Master 1 2 3 4 5	Purple Adult	Blue Master 4 to 7	Purple Master 1 to 7	Blue Juvenile	Black Master 3 to 7
Blue Adult	Blue Adult	Blue Master 1 to 7	Purple Master 1 to 7	Brown Master 1 to 7	Purple Juvenile	Black Adult
	Blue Master 1 to 3		Brown Master 1 to 7	Black Master 1 and 2	Brown Adult	White Juvenile
				Brown Adult	Black Master 1 to 7	Blue Juvenile
					Black Adult	Purple Juvenile

== Medal summary ==
=== Men's medallists ===
Adult male black belt results

Division	Gold	Silver	Bronze
Rooster -57.5 kg (127 lb)	(Brazil) Thalison Soares; Art of Jiu Jitsu	(Brazil) Welerson Gonçalves; Nova União	(United States) Frank Cespedes; Alliance Jiu Jitsu
Rooster -57.5 kg (127 lb)	(Brazil) Thalison Soares; Art of Jiu Jitsu	(Brazil) Welerson Gonçalves; Nova União	(United States) Tadiyah Danforth; Alliance Jiu Jitsu
Light-feather -64 kg (141 lb)	(United States) Malachi Edmond; Team Lloyd Irvin	(Brazil) Diego Oliveira Batista; Dream Art	(Brazil) Leonardo Pereira; Cicero Costha
Light-feather -64 kg (141 lb)	(United States) Malachi Edmond; Team Lloyd Irvin	(Brazil) Diego Oliveira Batista; Dream Art	(Japan) Tomoyuki Hashimoto; Brasa CTA
Feather -70 kg (150 lb)	(Brazil) Fabricio Andrey; Melqui Galvão Jiu-jitsu	(Brazil) Alex Sodre; Nova União	(South Korea) Jun Yong Cho; KJ Competition Team
Feather -70 kg (150 lb)	(Brazil) Fabricio Andrey; Melqui Galvão Jiu-jitsu	(Brazil) Alex Sodre; Nova União	(Brazil) Lucas Rodrigues; Aura Jiu Jitsu
Light -76 kg (168 lb)	(Brazil) Andy Murasaki; Atos Jiu-Jitsu	(Brazil) Natan Cheung; Fratres Brazilian Jiu-Jitsu	(United States) Elijah Dorsey; Team Lloyd Irvin
Light -76 kg (168 lb)	(Brazil) Andy Murasaki; Atos Jiu-Jitsu	(Brazil) Natan Cheung; Fratres Brazilian Jiu-Jitsu	(Brazil) Luiz Dos Santos; Team Predador Brasil
Middleweight -82 kg (181 lb)	(Brazil) Tainan Dalpra; Art of Jiu Jitsu	(Belarus) Pavel Kalesnik; Brasa CTA	(Poland) Jakub Najdek; Checkmat
Middleweight -82 kg (181 lb)	(Brazil) Tainan Dalpra; Art of Jiu Jitsu	(Belarus) Pavel Kalesnik; Brasa CTA	(Brazil) Lucas Protasio; Checkmat
Medium-heavyweight -88 kg (194 lb)	(Brazil) Jansen Gomes; Checkmat	(Brazil) Pedro Machado; Atos Jiu-Jitsu	(Brazil) Marcos Martins; Fratres Brazilian Jiu-Jitsu
Medium-heavyweight -88 kg (194 lb)	(Brazil) Jansen Gomes; Checkmat	(Brazil) Pedro Machado; Atos Jiu-Jitsu	(Brazil) Wellington Sebastião; Fratres Brazilian Jiu-Jitsu
Heavyweight -94 kg (207 lb)	(Brazil) Fellipe Andrew; Alliance Jiu Jitsu	(Poland) Adam Wardzinski; Checkmat	(United States) Devhonte Johnson; Unity Jiu-jitsu
Heavyweight -94 kg (207 lb)	(Brazil) Fellipe Andrew; Alliance Jiu Jitsu	(Poland) Adam Wardzinski; Checkmat	(Brazil) Rider Zuchi; Fratres Brazilian Jiu-Jitsu
Super-heavyweight -100 kg (220 lb)	(Brazil) Kaynan Duarte; Atos Jiu-Jitsu	(Brazil) Luis Oliveira; Fratres Brazilian Jiu-Jitsu	(Brazil) Harryson Perreira; Ataque Duplo
Super-heavyweight -100 kg (220 lb)	(Brazil) Kaynan Duarte; Atos Jiu-Jitsu	(Brazil) Luis Oliveira; Fratres Brazilian Jiu-Jitsu	(Brazil) Marcus Vinicius Ribeiro; Alliance Jiu Jitsu
Ultra-heavyweight +100 kg (220 lb)	(United States) Mason Fowler; Brasa CTA	(Norway) Kjetil Lydvo; Frontline Academy	(Brazil) Cleyton Flores; Team Cruz BJJ
Ultra-heavyweight +100 kg (220 lb)	(United States) Mason Fowler; Brasa CTA	(Norway) Kjetil Lydvo; Frontline Academy	(Morocco) Seif-Eddine Houmine; GFTeam
Absolute; Openweight	(Brazil) Kaynan Duarte; Atos Jiu-Jitsu	(Brazil) Rider Zuchi; Fratres Brazilian Jiu-Jitsu	(Portugal) Bruno Lima; Alexandre Machado Association - AMA Jiu-Jitsu Team
Absolute; Openweight	(Brazil) Kaynan Duarte; Atos Jiu-Jitsu	(Brazil) Rider Zuchi; Fratres Brazilian Jiu-Jitsu	(United States) Mason Fowler; Brasa CTA

=== Women's medallists ===
Adult female black belt results

Division	Gold	Silver	Bronze
Rooster -48.5 kg (107 lb)	(Brazil) Jessica Caroline Dantas; R1NG BJJ	(Brazil) Thaís Loureiro Felipe; Atos Jiu-Jitsu	(United States) Jessa Khan; Art of Jiu Jitsu
Rooster -48.5 kg (107 lb)	(Brazil) Jessica Caroline Dantas; R1NG BJJ	(Brazil) Thaís Loureiro Felipe; Atos Jiu-Jitsu	(Canada) Vicky Hoang; Jiu-Jitsu For Life Team
Light-feather -53.5 kg (118 lb)	(Brazil) Mayssa Bastos; Unity Jiu Jitsu	(Brazil) Brenda Larissa; Melqui Galvão Jiu-jitsu	(Spain) Naiomi Matthews; Team Ganbaru
Light-feather -53.5 kg (118 lb)	(Brazil) Mayssa Bastos; Unity Jiu Jitsu	(Brazil) Brenda Larissa; Melqui Galvão Jiu-jitsu	(Netherlands) Rose-Marie El Sharouni; Checkmat
Feather -58.5 kg (129 lb)	(Brazil) Ana Rodrigues; DreamArt	(Brazil) Andreia Cavalcante; ZR Team Association	(Wales) Ashley Bendle; Draig
Feather -58.5 kg (129 lb)	(Brazil) Ana Rodrigues; DreamArt	(Brazil) Andreia Cavalcante; ZR Team Association	(Poland) Zofia Szawernowska; Brasa CTA
Light -64 kg (141 lb)	(Brazil) Luiza Monteiro; Atos Jiu-Jitsu	(Brazil) Nathalie Ribeiro; CheckMat	(Brazil) Gabriela Pereira; Qatar BJJ / Vision Brasil
Light -64 kg (141 lb)	(Brazil) Luiza Monteiro; Atos Jiu-Jitsu	(Brazil) Nathalie Ribeiro; CheckMat	(Canada) Janine Mutton; Cicero Costha Internacional
Middleweight -69 kg (152 lb)	(Brazil) Thalyta Silva; DreamArt	(United States) Vannessa Griffin; Crazy 88	(United States) Elisabeth Ann Clay; Ares BJJ
Middleweight -69 kg (152 lb)	(Brazil) Thalyta Silva; DreamArt	(United States) Vannessa Griffin; Crazy 88	(Poland) Magdalena Loska; Brasa CTA
Medium-heavyweight -74 kg (163 lb)	(Poland) Maria Malyjasiak; Abmar Barbosa Association	(Brazil) Sábatha Laís; Fratres Brazilian Jiu-Jitsu	
Medium-heavyweight -74 kg (163 lb)	(Poland) Maria Malyjasiak; Abmar Barbosa Association	(Brazil) Sábatha Laís; Fratres Brazilian Jiu-Jitsu	(Brazil) Gabriele da Silva Schuck; ZR Team Association
Super-heavyweight (No Limit)	(Brazil) Gabrieli Pessanha; Infight JJ	Claire-France Thevenon; Panda Supa Crew	
Absolute; Openweight	(Brazil) Gabrieli Pessanha; Infight JJ	(Brazil) Thalyta Stefhane; DreamArt	(Brazil) Luiza Monteiro; Atos Jiu-Jitsu
Absolute; Openweight	(Brazil) Gabrieli Pessanha; Infight JJ	(Brazil) Thalyta Stefhane; DreamArt	(Poland) Maria Malyjasiak; Abmar Barbosa Association

=== Teams results ===
Results by Academy

Rank	Men's division	
Rank	Team	Points
1	Checkmat	94
2	Alliance Jiu Jitsu	92
3	Atos Jiu-Jitsu	53
4	Qatar BJJ / Vision Brasil	44
5	Carlson Gracie Team	31
6	Art of Jiu Jitsu	28
7	DreamArt	22
8	GFTeam	15
9	Nova União	15
10	Fratres Brazilian Jiu-Jitsu	15

Rank	Women's division	
Rank	Team	Points
1	DreamArt	39
2	Checkmat	36
3	Qatar BJJ / Vision Brasil	33
4	Atos Jiu-Jitsu	23
5	Gracie Barra	23
6	Carlson Gracie Team	22
7	Unity Jiu Jitsu	21
8	Infight JJ	19
9	Carranca Team	18
10	Nova União	18

== See also ==
- Asian IBJJF Jiu-Jitsu Championship
- Pan IBJJF Jiu-Jitsu Championship
- World IBJJF Jiu-Jitsu Championship
- European IBJJF Jiu-Jitsu Championship
