= Ffion Davies =

Submission grappler from Wales

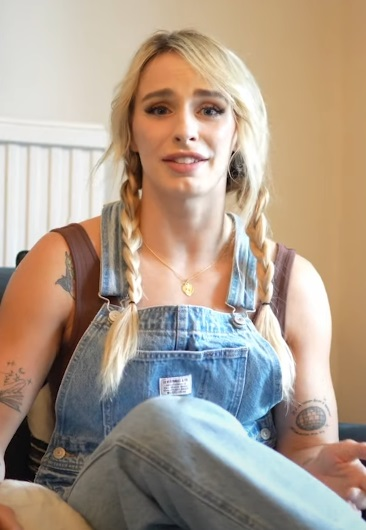
- Born: Ffion Eira Davies; 18 January 1995 (age 31); Swansea, Wales
- Division: Feather / Light: Gi Weight Classes; Under 64 kilograms (141 lb); No-Gi Weight Classes; Under 61.5 kilograms (136 lb)
- Style: Submission grappling
- Team: Atos JJ International; ECJJA Dublin
- Trainer: JT Torres; Darragh O Conaill
- Rank: 1st degree BJJ black belt; Judo black belt

Mixed martial arts record
- Total: 1
- Wins: 1
- By knockout: 1
- Losses: 0

Other information
- Mixed martial arts record from Sherdog

Ffion Davies (born 18 January 1995) is a Welsh submission grappler. She is a multiple winner of the IBJJF World Championship, including the no-gi championship in 2023 in both the 61 kg and absolute divisions. As of October 7, 2025, Davies is ranked the #2 pound-for-pound women's no-gi grappler in the world by Flograppling.

Davies is the first lightweight athlete to win double gold at the No-Gi World Championship, the first British/Welsh black belt world champion (in both gi and no-gi), the first European to win the Brazilian Nationals, the lightest-ever competitor to win the IBJJF European absolute division, and the first British/Welsh ADCC World Champion.

A member of Wales national judo team when she was a junior, Davies holds a black belt in both BJJ and judo.

== Early life ==
Ffion Eira Davies was born on 18 January 1995 in Swansea, Wales. She started playing rugby then switched to judo at the age of 8 starting competing extensively, Davies became a Welsh and British Open judo champion in the junior division and was selected into the Welsh National Judo team.

== Career ==
=== Early career ===
After leaving judo during her teenage years, Davies started MMA in 2013 alongside Brett Johns. Davies won her first four MMA fights by first round submission, then decided to focus on learning Brazilian jiu-jitsu; she trained under Chris Rees, the first Welsh black belt in jiu-jitsu, receiving her blue belt from him at his Academy in Swansea. In 2015, competing under Gracie Barra as a blue belt, she won her first European Championship in the Lightweight division. After attending seminars of black belt Darragh O’Conaill, Davies moved to Dublin to start training at East Coast Jiu-Jitsu. On 27 November 2018, O’Conaill promoted her to black belt.

=== Black belt career ===
==== 2018–2019: IBJJF World No-Gi Champion, European Champion, Pan Am Champion ====
A month after receiving her belt, Davies won double gold at the Dublin International Open (Feather and Open Class) followed by gold at the World No-Gi Championship becoming the first black belt from the UK to win that tournament. At the start of 2019 she won the European Championship, the Polaris Grappling Invitational, the Abu Dhabi Grand Slam London, and then became Pan American Champion after winning gold in California. A month later, Davies won the Brazilian National Jiu-Jitsu Championship (known as Brasileiros) becoming the first European to win, and then winning Bronze at the 2019 World Jiu-Jitsu Championship (known as Mundials).

At the 2019 ADCC Submission Fighting World Championship, she won Silver after submitting the tournament's favourite Bia Mesquita in the semi-final, in what has been called "one of the most shocking upsets in jiu-jitsu history" she was invited to compete at the 2022 ADCC World Championship as a result. She returned to the UK to win the British National followed by the Berlin International Open Championship in November.

==== 2020–2021: Third European and second World No-Gi championship titles ====
In 2020, Davies won double gold at the European Championship in the Lightweight division and in Open Class, beating the Super-Heavyweight Champion Jessica Flowers, becoming the lightest grappler to win the European absolute division. After returning to the UK she won another Abu Dhabi Grand Slam London. In 2021, she won the World No-Gi championship for the second time in her weight division. At the 2022 Pan Jiu-Jitsu Championship Davies won silver after being defeated by Nathalie Ribeiro in the final, both competitors were praised for their sportsmanship following the match, after congratulating her opponent Davies posted: "We all have the same goal and will likely all have our moment. Don’t dull anyone else’s shine."

==== 2022: IBJJF World Champion, ADCC Submission Fighting World Champion ====
In early 2022, Davies started training at Essential Jiu Jitsu (an Atos affiliated academy), under the coaching of JT Torres. In June 2022 Davies won the World Jiu-Jitsu Championship in the Lightweight division, becoming the first Welsh and British black belt jiu-jitsu world champion. At the 2022 ADCC World Championship Davies became the first Welsh and British Submission Fighting world champion after submitting Adele Fornarino in the first round, defeating Bia Mesquita 6–0 in the semi-final, and Brianna Ste-Marie by a score of 10–0 in the final.

==== 2023: Second IBJJF World title ====
Davies competed in the women's under 66 kg Grand Prix at Polaris 23 on March 11, 2023. Davies defeated Giovanna Jara in the opening round before being submitted by the eventual champion Elisabeth Clay in the semi-final.

On March 26, 2023, Davies won a silver medal in the lightweight division of the 2023 Pan Jiu-Jitsu Championship. On 4 June 2023, Davies won the IBJJF World Championship for the second time, in the lightweight division.

Davies was booked to defend her WNO flyweight title against Jasmine Rocha at Who's Number One on August 10, 2023. She won the match by unanimous decision and successfully defended the title.

Davies won both the lightweight and the absolute division at the IBJJF No-Gi World Championship 2023, becoming the first European to win the absolute division and the first to win two gold medals at the same edition of the tournament.

==== 2024 ====
Davies competed against Luana Pinheiro in the co-main event of ADXC 2 on January 19, 2024. She won the match by submission in the first round. Davies was then scheduled to defend her flyweight title against Amanda Alequin at Who's Number One 22 on February 9, 2024, but she withdrew from the match due to undisclosed reasons.

Davies defended her under 55 kg title against Brianna Ste-Marie at Polaris 27 on March 23, 2024. She won the match by decision and retained her title. She then competed in the main event of Subversion 5: Reign against Nikki Lloyd-Griffiths for the promotion's inaugural featherweight title on April 6, 2024. She won the match by submission and became the champion.

Davies faced Morgan Black in a bantamweight submission grappling match in the co-main event of ADXC 4 on May 18, 2024. She won the match by submission.

Davies was originally scheduled to compete in the 2024 ADCC World Championship, but she left in order to compete at the inaugural Craig Jones Invitational on August 16 and 17, 2024 instead. She faced Mackenzie Dern in a superfight after Dern also left the 2024 ADCC World Championship. Davies won the match by submission with an armbar.

==== 2025 ====
Davies was scheduled to face Adele Fornarino in the main event of UFC Fight Pass Invitational 10 on March 6, 2025. The match was cancelled when Davies suffered a shoulder injury in training. The match was later rebooked for UFC Fight Pass Invitational 11 on May 29, 2025. It was also announced that Davies had signed an exclusive contract with UFC Fight Pass.

Davies was scheduled to serve as the captain for Team Europe in the first female Squads event at Polaris 32 on June 28, 2025, but withdrew due to an injury and was replaced by Nia Blackman.

Davies faced Margot Ciccarelli for the co-main event at Polaris 34, winning by unanimous decision after 3 5-minute rounds.

== Competitive summary ==
Main achievements at black belt level:

- 2 x IBJJF World Champion (2022 / 2023)
- 2X IBJJF World No-Gi champion (2018/2021)
- ADCC Submission Fighting World Champion (2022)
- 3X IBJJF European Open champion (2019/2020 (Note: Davies won both Lightweight and Openweight divisions, becoming the lightest competitor ever to do so by beating the Super-Heavyweight Champion.))
- 1X CBJJ Brazilian Nationals champion (2019)
- 1X Pan American Championship champion (2019)
- 2X UAEJJF Grand Slam winner, London (2019 / 2020)
- 2nd place ADCC Submission Fighting World Championship (2019)
- 2nd place UAEJJF Abu Dhabi World Pro (2019)
- British National IBJJF Jiu-jitsu Champion (2019)
- 3rd place AJP Grand Slam LDN (2022)

Main Achievements (Coloured Belts):

- 1X IBJJF World champion (2018 brown)
- 1X IBJJF World No-Gi champion (2016 purple)
- 1X IBJJF European Open champion (2015 blue, 2016 purple)
- 2X IBJJF European Open No-Gi champion (2018 (Note: Weight and absolute) brown)
- 1X ADCC European Trials champion (2018)
- 2nd Place IBJJF World Championship (2016/2017 purple)
- 2nd Place UAEJJF Abu Dhabi Pro (2018 brown)
- 2nd Place IBJJF European Open (2018 brown)

== Instructor lineage ==
Royler Gracie → Saulo Ribeiro → (Alexandre Ribeiro) → Darragh O’Conaill → Ffion Davies

== Grappling record (incomplete) ==
Result	Opponent	Method	Event	Weight	Date
Loss	Elisabeth Clay	Toe hold	Polaris 23	66 kg	2023
Win	Giovanna Jara	Points	Polaris 23	66 kg	2023
Win	Bia Mesquita	Points	2022 ADCC World Championship	-60 kg	2022
Win	Brianna Ste-Marie	Points	2022 ADCC World Championship	-60 kg	2022
Win	Adele Fornarino	Choke	2022 ADCC World Championship	-60 kg	2022
Win	V. Vieira	Armbar	2022 Raw Grappling No. 2		2022
Win	P. Ivette	Decision	SUBVERSIV 7		2022
Win	R. Guedes	Decision	SUBVERSIV 7		2022
Win	J. Flowers	Decision	SUBVERSIV 7		2022
Win	V. Vieira	Bow and Arrow	2022 World Jiu-Jitsu IBJJF Championship	Lightweight	2022
Win	J. Maia	Points	2022 World Jiu-Jitsu IBJJF Championship	Lightweight	2022
Win	Margot Ciccarelli	Points	2022 World Jiu-Jitsu IBJJF Championship	Lightweight	2022
Win	K. Mikkelson	RNC	2022 World Jiu-Jitsu IBJJF Championship	Lightweight	2022
Win	Margot Ciccarelli	Armbar	2022 Pan Jiu Jitsu IBJJF Championship	Lightweight	2022
Win	T. Monteiro	Decision	2022 Pan Jiu Jitsu IBJJF Championship	Lightweight	2022
Loss	Nathalie Ribeiro	Points	2022 Pan Jiu Jitsu IBJJF Championship	Lightweight	2022
Win	Margot Ciccarelli	Armbar	2022 Pan Jiu Jitsu IBJJF Championship	Lightweight	2022
Win	P. Batista	Armbar	Grappling Industries Dublin	150 lbs	2021
Win	K. Sheehan	Other	Grappling Industries Dublin	150 lbs	2021
Win	Nathalie Ribeiro	Decision	FloGrappling WNO: The Return of Gordon Ryan		2021
Win	H. Sharp	Points	2021 World IBJJF Jiu-Jitsu No-Gi Championship	Lightweight	2021
Loss	Gabrielle McComb	Triangle Arm Bar	2021 World IBJJF Jiu-Jitsu No-Gi Championship	Absolute Division	2021
Win	N. Sullivan	Armbar	2021 World IBJJF Jiu-Jitsu No-Gi Championship	Lightweight	2021
Win	T. Biagi	RNC	2021 World IBJJF Jiu-Jitsu No-Gi Championship	Lightweight	2021
Win	Fernanda Mazzelli	RNC	2021 World IBJJF Jiu-Jitsu No-Gi Championship	Lightweight	2021
Loss	T. Porfirio	Decision	Grapplefest 9	Absolute Division	2020
Win	L. Campos	Advantage	2020 European IBJJF Jiu-Jitsu Championship	Absolute Division	2020
Win	C. Baumgarten	Choke From the Back	2020 European IBJJF Jiu-Jitsu Championship	Absolute Division	2020
Win	C. Baumgarten	RNC	2020 European IBJJF Jiu-Jitsu Championship	Lightweight	2020
Loss	J. Flowers	Points	2020 European IBJJF Jiu-Jitsu Championship	Absolute Division	2020
Win	P. Caiado	RNC	2020 European IBJJF Jiu-Jitsu Championship	Absolute Division	2020
Win	K. Hill	Armbar	2020 European IBJJF Jiu-Jitsu Championship	Lightweight	2020
Win	N. Sullivan	Points	2020 European IBJJF Jiu-Jitsu Championship	Lightweight	2020
Win	J. Maee	Armbar	2019 IBJJF Dublin Open	Middleweight	2019
Win	J. Maele	Other	2019 IBJJF Berlin Open	Absolute Division	2019
Win	C. Carriello	Armbar	2019 IBJJF Dublin Open	Middleweight	2019
Win	Bia Mesquita	Armbar	2019 ADCC World Championships	-60 kg	2019
Loss	Bianca Basilio	Toehold	2019 ADCC World Championships	-60 kg	2019
Win	R. Yuasa	Points	2019 ADCC World Championships	-60 kg	2019
Loss	N. Carriello	Points	2019 Pantheon Invitational	70 kg	2019
Win	J. Rivera	Armbar	2019 Pantheon Invitational		2019
Win	A. Yanes	Other	2019 Pantheon Invitational	62 kg	2019
Win	J. Maele	Points	2019 Pantheon Invitational	62 kg	2019
Win	M. Loska	RNC	2019 Pantheon Invitational		2019
Win	K. Kilarciyan	Choke From the Back	2019 Pantheon Invitational	62 kg	2019
Win	E. Karppinen	Decision	2019 Pantheon Invitational		2019
Win	T. Alencar	Decision	Polaris 11	Featherweight	2019
Loss	C. Perret	Guillotine	Fight 2 Win 114	Bantamweight	2019
Loss	Bianca Basilio	Other	2019 World Jiu-Jitsu IBJJF Championship	Featherweight	2019
Win	Nathalie Ribeiro	Other	2019 World Jiu-Jitsu IBJJF Championship	Featherweight	2019
Win	A. Schmitt	Choke From the Back	2019 Brazilian National Jiu-Jitsu Championship	Featherweight	2019
Win	N. Sullivan	Other	2019 Abu Dhabi World Professional Jiu-Jitsu Championship	62 kg	2019
Win	K. Sung	Other	2019 Abu Dhabi World Professional Jiu-Jitsu Championship	62 kg	2019
Loss	Bia Mesquita	Points	2019 Abu Dhabi World Professional Jiu-Jitsu Championship	62 kg	2019
Win	Nathalie Ribeiro	Other	2019 Pan Jiu-Jitsu IBJJF Championship	Featherweight	2019
Win	K. Antunes	Other	2019 Pan Jiu-Jitsu IBJJF Championship	Featherweight	2019
Win	Gezary Matuda	Katagatame	Polaris 9		2019
Win	Bianca Basilio	Points	2019 Abu Dhabi Grand Slam London	62 kg	2019
Win	S. Koikkalainen	Other	2019 Abu Dhabi Grand Slam London	62 kg	2019
Win	L. Paes	Points	2019 Abu Dhabi Grand Slam London	62 kg	2019
Win	C. Martin	RNC	GrappleFest 4		2019
Win	G. Fechter	Other	2019 European IBJJF Jiu-Jitsu Championship	Featherweight	2019
Win	G. Fechter	Other	2019 European IBJJF Jiu-Jitsu Championship	Featherweight	2019
Loss	L. Montiero	Other	2019 European IBJJF Jiu-Jitsu Championship	Absolute Division	2019
Loss	J. Flowers	Knee Bar	2018 European IBJJF Jiu-Jitsu Championship	Absolute Division	2018
Win	H. Raftery	Armbar	2018 World IBJJF Jiu-Jitsu No-Gi Championship	Featherweight	2018
Win	J. Santos	RNC	2018 World IBJJF Jiu-Jitsu No-Gi Championship	Absolute Division	2018
Win	N. Soares	Triangle Arm Bar	2018 World IBJJF Jiu-Jitsu No-Gi Championship	Featherweight	2018
Win	A. Nogueira	Points	2018 World IBJJF Jiu-Jitsu No-Gi Championship	Featherweight	2018
Win	Claire-France Thévenon	RNC	2018 IBJJF Dublin Open	Absolute Division	2018
Win	E. Tuukkanen	Reverse Triangle	2018 IBJJF Dublin Open	Featherweight	2018
Win	A. Pérez	Choke From the Back	2018 IBJJF Dublin Open	Absolute Division	2018
Win	D. Mindrinou	Bow and Arrow	2018 AJP Tour Spain National Pro	62 kg	2018
Win	L. Peretti	Other	2018 AJP Tour Spain National Pro	62 kg	2018
Win	P. Boveda	Other	2018 Abu Dhabi World Professional Jiu-Jitsu Championship	62 kg	2018
Win	C. Baumgarten	Points	2018 Abu Dhabi World Professional Jiu-Jitsu Championship	62 kg	2018
Loss	Bianca Basilio	Decision	2018 Abu Dhabi World Professional Jiu-Jitsu Championship	62 kg	2018
Win	C. Leah	Armbar	Polaris 6	55 kg	2018
Loss	Bia Mesquita	Armbar	2017 ADCC World Championships	-60 kg	2017
Loss	Talita Alencar	Choke	EBI 12	125 lbs	2017

== Personal life ==
Ffion Davies is a native Welsh speaker. In a 2020 interview she stated that she had previously been a vegetarian.

== Awards and honours ==
- Jitsmagazine BJJ Awards 'Female Grappler of the Year (No Gi)' (2022)
- Jitsmagazine BJJ Awards 'Female Grappler of the Year (Gi & No Gi)' (2020)
