= Rafael Mendes =

Jiu-Jitsu fighter

- Born: June 20, 1989 (age 36); Rio Claro, São Paulo, Brazil
- Nationality: (Brazil) Brazilian
- Division: Featherweight: under 154.0 lbs (-70 kg)(with gi)
- Team: AOJ (Art of Jiu Jitsu)
- Rank: 3rd Degree Black belt in Brazilian Jiu-Jitsu from Ramon Lemos
- Years active: 2001-present

Rafael Mendes
Medal record

Representing Brazil

Men's Submission Wrestling

ADCC World Championship
Gold medal – first place	2009 Barcelona, Spain	-66kg
Gold medal – first place	2011 Nottingham, UK	-66kg
Silver medal – second place	2013 Beijing, China	-66kg

ADCC South American Championship
Gold medal – first place	2009 Rio de Janeiro	-66kg

Brazilian Jiu-Jitsu

World Championship
Bronze medal – third place	2009 California, USA	-70kg
Gold medal – first place	2010 California, USA	-70kg
Gold medal – first place	2011 California, USA	-70kg
Gold medal – first place	2012 California, USA	-70kg
Silver medal – second place	2013 California, USA	-70kg
Gold medal – first place	2014 California, USA	-70kg
Gold medal – first place	2015 California, USA	-70kg
Gold medal – first place	2016 California, USA	-70kg

Pan American Championship
Gold medal – first place	2012 California, USA	-70kg
Gold medal – first place	2013 California, USA	-70kg

Brazilian National Championship
Gold medal – first place	2010 Rio de Janeiro, Brazil	-70 kg

World Cup
Gold medal – first place	2009 Abu Dhabi, UAE	-65kg
Gold medal – first place	2010 Abu Dhabi, UAE	-65kg
Silver medal – second place	2011 Abu Dhabi, UAE	-65kg

Nogi World Cup
Gold medal – first place	2011 Abu Dhabi, UAE	-65kg
Silver medal – second place	2011 Abu Dhabi, UAE	Absolute

San Francisco International Open
Gold medal – first place	2013 California, USA	-70kg

Rafael Mendes Godoy (born 1989 in Rio Claro, São Paulo, Brazil) is a six-time Brazilian Jiu Jitsu (BJJ) world champion at the black belt level. Rafael, along with his brother Guilherme, are 3rd degree black belts under Ramon Lemos and founders of the academy Art of Jiu-Jitsu. His technical mastery of jiu jitsu has earned him the nickname "The Wizard".

== Biography ==
Rafael and his brother Guilherme started their jiu jitsu training through an older cousin named Thiago Mendes, who was a purple belt under Leonardo Santos. After only a few months of training, Thiago recognized great potential for the youngsters and took them to come and train with Ramon Lemos & Leonardo Santos.

It was also around this time that the Mendes’s parents split, leaving both brothers without a fatherly figure. Guilherme and Rafael have reported to the media several times of how their coach Ramon Lemos filled most of that void, teaching them not only BJJ but the moral values with which they built their character.

Rafael went on to win the World Championships from blue belt all the way to brown in consecutive years, achieving the bronze medal in his first year as a black belt (2009) and winning his first world gold medal as a black belt in 2010.

When he was 17, and having never competed without a gi (kimono) before, Rafael was enlisted by Ramon Lemos in the ADCC Brazilian Trials, arguably the hardest trial event in the world for its biggest Submission Wrestling tournament (the ADCC). Rafael made it to the final of the trials losing a hard fight against Bruno Frazatto (who would later become his friend and team mate at Atos).

Ramon Lemos awarded Rafael his Black Belt in late 2008. Rafael won the Jiu Jitsu World Pro Abu Dhabi Cup, one of the best and hardest competitions in the world, winning a gold medal also at the ADCC finals, placing 3rd in the Mundial… medaling on all 3 competitions and fighting against Rubens Charles Maciel “Cobrinha” (Considered the best fighter of 2009 by the Brazilian Press). In 2010 Rafa went on to win Brazilian nationals and his first world championship as a black belt.

== Mendes vs Cobrinha ==
Rafael Mendes' primary rival throughout his career has been multiple-time world champion Rubens Charles Maciel who is better known as "Cobrinha." They have met in the finals many times.

Match #1 - Capital Challenge (Jordan) December 2008—Cobrinha wins 3x0 (guard pass near the end of the time limit).

Match #2 – Pan Jiu-jitsu Championship 2009-(Carson, California. USA) March 2009—Cobrinha wins via disqualification (Rafael gets dq’ed for lacing his leg around Cobrinhas knee).

Match #3 - Abu Dhabi Pro World Cup (Abu Dhabi, UAE) May 2009—Mendes wins 4x2 (back and forth battle of sweep after sweep).

Match #4 - World Championship 2009 (Long Beach, California. USA) June 2009—Cobrinha wins via judges decision (back and forth battle).

Match #5 - ADCC 2009-(Barcelona, Spain) October 2009—Mendes wins 7x4 (In double overtime, with the score tied 4×4, Rafael gets Cobrinhas back with hooks at the final moments of the match).

Match #6 - Brasileiro 2010 (Tijuca, Rio de Janeiro. Brazil) May 2010—Mendes wins 4x2 (battle of 50/50 guard from both athletes, as well as footlock attempts).

Match #7 – World Championship 2010 (Long Beach, California. USA) June 2010—Mendes wins 4x4, 5-3 advantages (back and forth battle of sweeps and leg/foot locks).

Match #8 - ADCC 2011 - (Nottingham, England) September 2011—Mendes wins 0x-1 (Cobrinha incurred a negative point for pulling guard).

Match #9 - Pan Ams, April 2012—Mendes wins via Armbar Submission

Match #10 - World Championship 2012 (Long Beach, California. USA) June 2012—Mendes wins via Referee Decision

Match #11 - Pan Ams, March 2013 (Long Beach, California. USA) -- Mendes wins via Referee Decision (2-2 points)

Match #12 - ADCC 2013 - (Beijing, China) October 2013 — Cobrinha wins in double overtime via Referee Decision.

Match #13 - World Championship 2014 (Long Beach, California. USA) June 2014—Mendes wins via points (10-8)

Match #14 - World Championship 2015 (Long Beach, California. USA) May 2015—Mendes wins via points (6-0)

== The Art of Jiu Jitsu Academy ==
After teaching many seminars, the Mendes Brothers decided that they wanted to have a traditional jiu jitsu school and have their own students. In July 2012, with the help of their long time sponsor and RVCA founder, Pat Tenore, Rafael Mendes and fellow champion and brother, Guilherme Mendes opened up The Art of Jiu Jitsu Academy in Costa Mesa, California. On October 6, 2020, the Art of Jiu Jitsu's famous kid's program produced its first black belt, eighteen-year-old Jessa Khan.

== See also ==
- Tainan Dalpra
- Gabi Pessanha
- Helio Gracie
- Gracie Barra
- Cyborg Abreu
- André Galvão
- Jonathan Torres
- Kaynan Duarte
- Adam Wardziński
- Anna Rodrigues
- Guilherme Mendes
