= Isaque Bahiense =

Brazilian jiu-jitsu world champion

Isaque Bahiense is a Brazilian jiu-jitsu black belt world champion competitor and professor, and founder of the Dream Art Project. He had trained at Alliance Jiu Jitsu previously.

His world champion students include Carlos Henrique and Anna Rodrigues.

== Professional grappling career ==
=== 2020-2021 ===
Bahiense competed at BJJ Bet on September 6, 2020 where he submitted Gregor Gracie with a guillotine. He was then invited to compete in a middleweight grand prix at BJJ Stars 4 on November 14, 2020. He won his first two matches but lost to Leandro Lo in the final.

Bahiense returned at BJJ Stars 5 on February 6, 2021 for a superfight with Roberto Jimenez. He won the match 4-0 on points. He then competed at Big Deal Pro 3 on July 10, 2021 where he defeated Servio Tulio on points. He then won gold in the 85kg division of the Abu Dhabi World Pro on November 18, 2021. On December 12, 2022, Bahiense competed in the middleweight division of the IBJJF World Championship and won a silver medal.

=== 2022-2023 ===
On February 6, 2022, Bahiense won the 88kg division of the ADCC South American trials. He entered the medium-heavyweight division of the IBJJF World Championship on June 5, 2022 and won a silver medal. Bahiense then made his debut at the 2022 ADCC World Championship in the 88kg division, although he lost to eventual champion Giancarlo Bodoni in the opening round. He then competed in the main event BJJ Stars 9 on October 9, 2022 against Micael Galvão. He won the match on penalties. He then competed in the IBJJF Grand Prix 2022 on October 28, where he won gold in the medium-heavyweight division.

He was invited to compete against Tainan Dalpra in the main event of the IBJJF Grand Prix 2023 on March 3, 2023. He lost the match on points. He entered the medium-heavyweight division of the IBJJF World Championship on June 11, 2023 and won a bronze medal.

Bahiense was invited to compete in a superfight against Matheus Spirandeli at BJJ Stars 11 on September 9, 2023. He won the match by submission. Bahiense competed in a rematch against Gustavo Batista in the main event of ADXC 1 on October 20, 2023. He won the match by unanimous decision.

=== 2024 ===
Bahiense competed at the second ADCC South American Trials 2024 on March 9, 2024, where he won a bronze medal at under 88kg.

Bahiense competed in the medium-heavyweight grand prix at BJJ Stars 12 on April 27, 2024. He made it to the semi-final before losing on points to Fellipe Andrew.

Bahiense won a bronze medal in the medium-heavyweight division of the IBJJF World Championship 2024 on June 1, 2024.

Bahiense competed against Joao Gabriel Rocha at Pit Submission Series 6 on June 28, 2024. He lost the match by split decision.

Bahiense was scheduled to compete against Lucas 'Hulk' Barbosa at BJJ Stars 13: Vikings Edition on August 3, 2024. Barbosa was replaced by Alexandre de Jesus on short notice and Bahiense won the match by submission.

Bahiense faced Ronaldo Junior at UFC Fight Pass Invitational 8 on October 10, 2024. He lost the match by submission.

Bahiense competed against Bruno Lima in the co-main event of ADXC 6 on October 25, 2024. He lost the match by unanimous decision.

=== 2025 ===
Bahiense was due to compete in the middleweight no gi grand prix at BJJ Stars 15 on April 26, 2025, but got injured and was replaced.

== Mixed martial arts career ==
Bahiense announced in November 2023 that he was going to be making his professional MMA debut after the 2024 edition of the IBJJF World Championship.

== Instructor lineage ==
Carlos Gracie > Helio Gracie > Rolls Gracie > Romero Cavalcanti > Fábio Gurgel > Isaque Bahiense
