= Beatriz Mesquita =

Brazilian BJJ practitioner and mixed martial artist

- Born: 7 April 1991 (age 35); Rio de Janeiro, Brazil
- Other names: Bia
- Height: 5 ft 2 in (157 cm)
- Division: Peso Leve (Lightweight) (BJJ); Bantamweight (MMA)
- Style: Brazilian Jiu-Jitsu
- Team: Gracie Humaita (BJJ); American Top Team (2023–present)
- Trainer: Leticia Ribeiro
- Rank: 2nd degree black belt in Brazilian Jiu-Jitsu under Leticia Ribeiro
- Years active: 2024–present (MMA)

Mixed martial arts record
- Total: 9
- Wins: 9
- By knockout: 1
- By submission: 7
- By disqualification: 1
- Losses: 0

Other information
- Mixed martial arts record from Sherdog

Beatriz Mesquita (born 7 April 1991), also known as Bia Mesquita is a Brazilian Jiu Jitsu (BJJ) competitor and mixed martial artist. She has won 24 titles at black belt level in the four major Gi Championships. With 10 gold medals, as of Worlds 2021, she holds the record for the most IBJJF World Championship titles at black belt level and is a member of the IBJJF Hall of Fame. As of November 14, 2026, she is #5 in the Meta UFC women's bantamweight rankings.

== Grappling career ==
=== Early career ===
Beatriz de Oliveira Mesquita began training Brazilian jiu-jitsu at aged five in 1996, besides jiujitsu she also trained in judo, wrestling and swimming. By the time she was 10 she had won the Brazilian National Junior Championships, three State Championships and several other major tournaments, she was sent to train under BJJ legend Leticia Ribeiro, in Tijuca, Rio de Janeiro. At 15 she trained in Freestyle wrestling winning a junior state title before dedicating herself to BJJ. She received her brown belt in June 2009 from professor Leticia Ribeiro, while standing on the podium of the World Championship. She went on to receive her black belt in March 2011 again from professor Ribeiro.

=== Black belt career ===
In 2017 she defeated UFC fighter and 2× World Jiu Jitsu Black Belt Champion Mackenzie Dern in 64 seconds at their first competitive meeting in the Rio Falls Jiu Jitsu open. In June 2018 Mesquita became the Eddie Bravo Invitational (EBI) Women's Bantamweight Champion submitting Luana Alzuguir in the Semi-final and Bianca Basílio in the final. On 12 December 2021, Mesquita won her 10th world title at the 2021 World Jiu-Jitsu Championship after beating Margot Ciccarelli in the semi-final and Luiza Monteiro in the final. At the 2022 ADCC World Championship Mesquita defeated Mayssa Bastos via points but then lost to Ffion Davies in the semi-finals; Mesquita won bronze after defeating Bianca Basilio by submission.

Mesquita faced Jennifer Maia in the main event of ADXC 3 on March 2, 2024. She won the match by submission.

Mesquita was invited to compete in the under 65 kg division of the 2024 ADCC World Championship. She submitted Sula-Mae Lowenthal in the opening round and lost a decision to Ana Carolina Vieira, before beating Brianna Ste-Marie by decision in the third-place match to win the bronze medal. She returned in the women's absolute division, submitting Kendall Reusing and beating Amy Campo by decision before losing to Adele Fornarino in the title to win a silver medal.

== Mixed martial arts career ==
=== Early career and Legacy Fighting Alliance ===
Mesquita announced on April 7, 2023, that she had signed a contract to be represented by First Round Management and would be making her MMA debut shortly. Mesquita announced on September 30, 2023 that she was going to be training at American Top Team.

Mesquita made her professional MMA debut against Jorgina Ramos at Spaten Fight Night on June 15, 2024. She won the fight by submission in the first round.

Mesquita faced Shannel Butler at LFA 194 on October 18, 2024. She won the fight by submission in the first round.

Mesquita then faced Fernanda Araujo at LFA 198 on December 7, 2024. She won the match by submission in the second round.

Mesquita faced Hope Chase at LFA 203 on March 6, 2025. She won the fight by disqualification in the second round.

Mesquita faced Sierra Dinwoodie for the vacant LFA Women's Bantamweight Championship on June 20, 2025, at LFA 211. She won the title via technical knockout in round two.

=== Ultimate Fighting Championship ===
On July 30, 2025, it was reported that Mesquita had signed with the Ultimate Fighting Championship. She made her debut against Irina Alekseeva on October 11, 2025, at UFC Fight Night 261. She won the fight via a rear-naked choke submission in the second round. This fight earned her a Performance of the Night award.

Mesquita faced Montserrat Rendon on March 16, 2026, at UFC Fight Night 269. She won the fight via a rear-naked choke submission in the first round.

Mesquita faced Melissa Mullins on June 20, 2026 at UFC Fight Night 279. She won the fight via an armbar submission in the first round.

Mesquita faced Macy Chiasson on November 14, 2026 at UFC 334. She won the fight via a rear-naked choke submission in the first round.

== Personal life ==
In January 2021, she announced being engaged to fellow BJJ competitor Patrick Gaudio after he proposed to her.

== Instructor lineage ==
Helio Gracie → Royler Gracie → Vini Aieta → Leticia Ribeiro > Beatriz Mesquita

== Championships and accomplishments ==
=== Mixed martial arts ===
- Ultimate Fighting Championship
  - Performance of the Night (One time) vs. Irina Alekseeva
  - Most submissions in UFC Women's Bantamweight division history (4)
    - Tied (Brendan Allen & Charles Oliveira) for fourth longest submission streak in UFC History (4)
  - UFC Honors Awards
    - 2025: Fan's Choice Debut of the Year Nominee vs. Irina Alekseeva
- Legacy Fighting Alliance
  - LFA Women's Bantamweight Championship (One time)
- MMA Fighting
  - 2025 Second Team MMA All-Star

=== Brazilian jiu-jitsu ===
- Brazilian Jiu-Jitsu
  - ADCC World Championship - 1st Place (2017)
  - IBJJF - World Championship - 1st Place (2014** / 2015 / 2016 / 2018 / 2019 / 2021)
  - IBJJF - World Championship No-Gi - 1st Place (2018)
  - IBJJF Pan Championship - 1st Place (2014** / 2015/ 2016)
  - IBJJF European Open - 1st Place (2018)
  - EBI 16 Bantamweights - 1st Place (2018)
  - UAEJJF Abu Dhabi Pro - 1st Place (2019 / 2021)
  - CBJJ Brazilian Nationals - 1st Place (2019**)
  - UAEJJF Grand Slam, ABD - 1st Place (2017)
  - UAEJJF Grand Slam, RJN - 1st Place (2017)
  - ADCC - 2nd Place (2024*)
  - IBJJF World Championship - 2nd Place (2016* / 2017)
  - IBJJF World Championship No-Gi - 2nd Place (2010*)
  - IBJJF Pan Championship - 2nd Place (2017)
  - ADCC - 3rd Place (2022 / 2024)

(*) Absolute (**) Weight and absolute

== Mixed martial arts record ==
Professional record breakdown
9 matches	9 wins	0 losses
By knockout	1	0
By submission	7	0
By disqualification	1	0

Res.	Record	Opponent	Method	Event	Date	Round	Time	Location	Notes
Win	9–0	Macy Chiasson	Submission (rear-naked choke)	UFC 334	November 14, 2026	1	3:23	New York City, New York, United States	
Win	8–0	Melissa Mullins	Submission (armbar)	UFC Fight Night: Kape vs. Horiguchi	June 20, 2026	1	3:16	Las Vegas, Nevada, United States	
Win	7–0	Montserrat Rendón	Submission (rear-naked choke)	UFC Fight Night: Emmett vs. Vallejos	March 14, 2026	1	2:07	Las Vegas, Nevada, United States	
Win	6–0	Irina Alekseeva	Submission (rear-naked choke)	UFC Fight Night: Oliveira vs. Gamrot	October 11, 2025	2	2:14	Rio de Janeiro, Brazil	Performance of the Night.
Win	5–0	Sierra Dinwoodie	TKO (punches)	LFA 211	June 20, 2025	2	3:05	Salamanca, New York, United States	Won the vacant LFA Women's Bantamweight Championship. Performance of the Night.
Win	4–0	Hope Chase	DQ (illegal upkick)	LFA 203	March 6, 2025	2	2:20	Las Vegas, Nevada, United States	
Win	3–0	Fernanda Araujo	Submission (rear-naked choke)	LFA 198	December 6, 2024	2	4:21	Commerce, California, United States	
Win	2–0	Shannel Butler	Submission (rear-naked choke)	LFA 194	October 18, 2024	1	3:24	Niagara Falls, New York, United States	
Win	1–0	Jorgina Ramos	Submission (rear-naked choke)	Spaten Fight Night: Silva vs. Sonnen 3	June 15, 2024	1	2:31	São Paulo, Brazil	Bantamweight debut.

== See also ==
- List of current UFC fighters
- List of female mixed martial artists
