= AOJ =

AOJ may refer to:

- the IATA code for Aomori Airport
- Art of Jiu Jitsu, a Brazilian jiu-jitsu academy based in California
- Axis of Justice, a non-profit organization based in Los Angeles, United States
