= Fellipe Andrew =

Brazilian jiu-jitsu practitioner

Fellipe Andrew Silva (born October 24, 1994) is a Brazilian jiu-jitsu black belt under Rodrigo Cavaca. He is the 2021 World Champion in the absolute division and 2023 World Champion in the 94 kg division. He is Euros Champion in 2019, 2020, 2022, and 2023. He is the Pan Champion of 2019, 2020, and 2021. Andrew was among six champions in the inaugural IBJJF Crown in 2023. In the lead-up to his championship wins, he was training at Zenith BJJ under Robert Drysdale. He later moved to Alliance Jiu Jitsu (San Diego branch), and then Art of Jiu Jitsu in Costa Mesa in 2024. In September 2024 Andrew was stripped of his Pan Ams medal and accepted two years of ineligibility for failing anti-doping tests.

== Early life and training ==
Andrew was born on October 24, 1994, in Caruaru, the state of Pernambuco, Brazil. Sports had a heavy influence on him. During his mid-teens, Andrew became interested in martial arts and practiced kung fu daily. In April 2011, a friend suggested that he should give Brazilian jiu-jitsu a try. Adriano Estanislau, whose academy was affiliated with Checkmat, became Andrew's first BJJ instructor. Rodrigo Cavaca, who would later leave Checkmat to form Zenith BJJ, trained with both Andrew and Estanislau. As a purple belt, Andrew moved to Santos, São Paulo to join Cavaca, after which his career took off in the Brazilian national and international circuits. In 2017 Andrew was matched against some of the best black belts in the world at the Copa Podio Grand Prix and obtained an honorable 2nd place. In December that year, he was promoted to black belt.

== Professional grappling career ==
=== 2019–2020 - Early career ===
Andrew won several major International Brazilian Jiu-Jitsu Federation (IBJJF) events in 2019 and 2020, including both the IBJJF European Championship and IBJJF Pan Championship. He was also part of the team to represent Alliance Gold at Subversiv 3 on August 28, 2020. He went 2–1 at the event, although his team finished in fourth place.

He then competed against William Tackett in the main event of Third Coast Grappling 5 on December 19, 2020. He lost the match by submission.

=== 2021–2022 - First IBJJF world championship ===
Andrew beat Max Gimenis by decision at Fight 2 Win 181 on August 14, 2021. He then competed in the IBJJF Pan Championship 2021 and won gold in both the heavyweight and absolute divisions. Andrew returned at Fight 2 Win 183 on September 10, 2021, where he submitted Fellipe Trovo with a choke. He then competed against Yuri Simões in the main event of Fight 2 Win 185 on September 24, 2021, and he lost a decision.

Andrew entered both the heavyweight and absolute divisions of the IBJJF World Championship 2021, and he finished with silver medals in both divisions. The absolute division champion Felipe Pena subsequently failed a PEDs test and was stripped of his title, meaning that Andrew was promoted to champion. Andrew was then invited to compete in the IBJJF Heavyweight Grand Prix 2021 on November 11, 2021, although he lost to Mahamed Aly in the opening round.

Andrew returned to IBJJF competition at the IBJJF European Championship 2022, where he won both the super-heavyweight and the absolute division. He was then invited to compete against Gutemberg Pereira in a superfight at BJJ Stars 8 on April 30, 2022, although he lost the match by submission. He then submitted Roosevelt Sousa in another superfight at the IBJJF Grand Prix 2022 on October 28, 2022.

=== 2023 - Second IBJJF world championship ===
Andrew competed in the heavyweight division of the IBJJF European Championship 2023 on January 23–29, 2023. He beat every opponent and won a gold medal in the division. Andrew then won four gold medals at the IBJJF Los Angeles Open 2023 on March 11, 2023, winning the heavyweight and absolute divisions in both gi and no gi.

Andrew entered the heavyweight division of the IBJJF Pan Championship on March 22–26, 2023. He left with a silver medal after losing to Adam Wardzinski in the final.

Andrew was then invited to compete in the absolute grand prix at BJJ Stars 10 on April 22, 2023. He beat his first three opponents before losing to Erich Munis in the final, taking second place.

Andrew won both the heavyweight and the absolute division at the IBJJF San Diego Spring Open 2023 on May 20, 2023. Andrew then entered the heavyweight division of the IBJJF World Championship 2023 on June 1–4, 2023. He won the division and won his second world title.

Andrew was invited to compete in the no gi absolute grand prix at UFC Fight Pass Invitational 4 on June 29, 2023. He was submitted in the opening round by Vagner Rocha.

Andrew then won a gold medal in the IBJJF Phoenix Open 2023 on July 29, 2023. He also won the absolute division of the IBJJF San Diego Summer Open 2023 on August 5, 2023.

Andrew was then invited to compete in the IBJJF Absolute Grand Prix on September 1, 2023. He beat his first match before losing to Victor Hugo in the semi-final. Andrew then won a gold medal in the light-heavyweight division of the Abu Dhabi Grand Slam - Miami on September 17, 2023.

Andrew competed in a superfight against Uanderson Ferreira at ADXC 1 on October 20, 2023. He won the match by submission. He then moved up to the super-heavyweight division for the Abu Dhabi World Professional Jiu-Jitsu Championship on November 8–10, 2023. He won a gold medal in the division.

Andrew returned to the heavyweight division for the inaugural edition of The IBJJF's The Crown tournament on November 19, 2023. He beat both Francisco Lo and Gustavo Batista in order to win the title.

=== 2024 - USADA suspension ===
Andrew started the year by competing in the heavyweight division of the IBJJF European Championship on January 28–29, 2024. He lost to Adam Wardzinski in the final and won a silver medal.

Andrew competed against Rayron Gracie in a superfight at ADXC 3 on March 2, 2024. He lost the match by submission.

Andrew won a gold medal in the heavyweight division of the IBJJF Pan Championship 2024 on March 24, 2024. He then won gold medals in both the heavyweight and absolute divisions of the IBJJF New York Spring Open 2024 on April 6, 2024.

Andrew was invited to compete in the medium-heavyweight grand prix at BJJ Stars 12 on April 27, 2024. He beat three opponents and won the tournament.

Andrew competed against Anderson Munis at BJJ Stars 13: Vikings Edition on August 3, 2024. He won the match by submission.

Andrew was invited to compete in the over 80kg division of the inaugural Craig Jones Invitational on August 16–17, 2024. He defeated Greg Kerkvliet, Joao Gabriel Rocha, and Inacio Santos before losing to Nick Rodriguez in the final. He announced shortly afterward that he was leaving Alliance Jiu Jitsu for Art of Jiu Jitsu.

In September 2024, Andrew was stripped of his Pan Ams title and accepted two years of ineligibility after testing positive for clomiphene and its metabolites on March 24, 2024. He received a provisional suspension on April 16th, 2024, which serves as the start date of his two years of ineligibility. Andrew was the 13th BJJ athlete caught since the introduction of anti-doping screenings to the IBJJF circuit.

Andrew was due to compete against Davis Asare at Polaris 29 on September 7th, 2024. The promotion later removed him from the event in line with their anti-doping policy.

Andrew then won a gold medal in the light-heavyweight division of the Abu Dhabi Grand Slam - Dallas on September 29, 2024.

Andrew faced Jansen Gomes for the medium-heavyweight title in the main event of BJJ Stars 14 on December 7, 2024. He lost the match on points.

=== 2025 ===
Andrew then faced Declan Moody at Who’s Number One 28 on June 13, 2025. He lost the match by submission with a heel hook.

Andrew represented Acai Republic at the AIGA Champions League finals 2025, going 0-1 as Acai Republic were eliminated in the opening round.

== Instructor lineage ==
Carlos Gracie > Carlson Gracie > Élcio Figueiredo > Rodrigo Cavaca > Fellipe Andrew
