= Guilherme Mendes =

Jiu-Jitsu fighter

- Born: 1988 (age 37–38); Rio Claro, São Paulo, Brazil
- Nickname: Gui
- Nationality: (Brazil) Brazilian
- Division: Featherweight (-64 kg) / Lightweight (-70 kg)
- Team: Art of Jiu-Jitsu (formerly Atos Jiu-Jitsu)
- Rank: 3rd-degree black belt in Brazilian Jiu-Jitsu under Ramon Lemos

Guilherme Mendes Godoy is a four-time Brazilian Jiu-Jitsu (BJJ) world champion at the black belt level. Alongside his brother Rafael Mendes, Guilherme is a 3rd-degree black belt under Ramon Lemos and a competitor for the Art of Jiu-Jitsu team. Considered one of the greatest featherweight (64 kg) fighters in the sport’s history, he was the first member of the Atos team to win a gold medal at the World Championship of the International Brazilian Jiu-Jitsu Federation (IBJJF) in 2009. He is also the co-founder of the Art of Jiu-Jitsu Academy alongside his brother Rafael.

== Biography ==
Guilherme was born in Rio Claro, Brazil. Together with his brother Rafael Mendes, he began training jiu-jitsu in 2001, influenced by an older cousin, Thiago Mendes, who was a purple belt under Leonardo Santos at the time. After just a few months of training, Thiago recognized the great potential of the two brothers and took them to train with Ramon Lemos and Leonardo Santos at the team’s main academy, where they were shaped as athletes. Nicknamed "Gui," Guilherme is a prominent figure in the Atos Jiu-Jitsu team and one of the top competitors in the "featherweight" (64 kg) division in the sport’s history. During their childhood, the Mendes brothers’ parents separated, and Ramon Lemos became a father figure, teaching not only jiu-jitsu techniques but also moral values that shaped their character.

Guilherme excelled in the colored belt divisions, winning IBJJF world titles in the blue, purple, and brown belt categories, as well as dominating the Brazilian National Championship at every belt level. He received his black belt in October 2008, awarded by Ramon Lemos, and quickly established himself as one of the top competitors in the black belt division. In 2009, he became the first Atos athlete to win the IBJJF World Championship, defeating Samuel Braga in the final by advantages.

== Competitive career ==
Guilherme Mendes’ competitive career is marked by remarkable achievements in the featherweight division. He won the IBJJF World Championship in 2009, 2011, 2012, and 2014, solidifying his status as one of the greatest names in jiu-jitsu history. In 2011, Guilherme showcased technical dominance by submitting Milton Carlos and Laercio Fernandes, defeating Samuel Braga in the semifinals and Ary Farias in the final to claim his second world title. In 2014, he faced Paulo Miyao in the World Championship final, securing his fourth gold medal, which qualified him for the IBJJF Hall of Fame.

In addition to his world titles, Guilherme won the IBJJF Pan American Championship and the Brazilian National Championship (CBJJ), establishing dominance in both colored and black belt divisions. He also competed in high-level events such as the Abu Dhabi World Pro, reaching the quarterfinals, and the Pan American Championship, where he made the semifinals in his first year as a black belt.

In May 2015, at the age of 26, Guilherme announced his retirement from professional jiu-jitsu competitions to focus on teaching and family. His decision came after winning his fourth world title, a milestone that earned him a place in the IBJJF Hall of Fame, where he was officially inducted in 2022. Throughout his career, he was recognized for his technical and strategic approach, particularly in the use of positions like the berimbolo, which he and his brother Rafael popularized in modern jiu-jitsu.

== Art of Jiu-Jitsu Academy ==
After teaching numerous seminars, the Mendes brothers decided to establish a traditional jiu-jitsu school with their own students. In July 2012, with the support of their long-time sponsor and founder of RVCA, Pat Tenore, Guilherme and Rafael Mendes opened the Art of Jiu-Jitsu Academy in Costa Mesa, California. Initially affiliated with Atos Jiu-Jitsu, the academy became independent in February 2020, competing under the Art of Jiu-Jitsu name.

The Art of Jiu-Jitsu is renowned for its elite youth program, which produced athletes such as Jessa Khan, the first black belt promoted from the academy’s kids’ program in October 2020 at age 18. In the same month, Tainan Dalpra was also promoted to black belt and went on to win the IBJJF World Championship in 2021. Other notable athletes trained at the academy include Johnatha Alves and brothers Tye and Kade Ruotolo, who trained at AOJ during their childhood.

The academy implemented an innovative model, inspired by established sports programs, with a structured curriculum that guides students from beginner to elite competitive levels. In 2015, the Mendes brothers created the "Believe & Achieve" scholarship program, providing financial support, housing, and training for promising young athletes such as Caio Antonini, Johnatha Alves, and Tainan Dalpra. This program has contributed to the development of world champions and solidified AOJ’s reputation as one of the most influential jiu-jitsu academies.

As head instructor, Guilherme is noted for his ability to strategize for his athletes, often compared to figures such as John Danaher in no-gi jiu-jitsu. During his time as head instructure, athletes like Tainan Dalpra, Cole Abate, and Zach Kaina won titles across various divisions. The Art of Jiu-Jitsu Academy is a successful academy in the United States. Its focus on developing "champions" and ensuring athlete financial stability is considered novel to the jiu-jitsu academy model.

== Legacy ==
Guilherme Mendes is widely respected for his contributions to jiu-jitsu, both as a competitor and as a coach. His early retirement at age 26 did not diminish his impact on the sport, as he continued to shape modern jiu-jitsu through the Art of Jiu-Jitsu. Alongside Rafael, he popularized techniques like the berimbolo, which became fundamental in the competitive lightweight division. Additionally, his vision of creating financial opportunities for athletes, combining sporting achievements with sustainable careers, has been highlighted as a model for the future of professional jiu-jitsu.

== See also ==
- Tainan Dalpra
- Gabi Pessanha
- Megaton Dias
- Carlos Lemos (fighter)
- Carlos Gracie Jr.
- Luiza Monteiro
- Tayane Porfírio
- Gezary Matuda
- Laurence Cousin
- Andresa Correa
