= Anna Rodrigues =

Brazilian jiu-jitsu practitioner from Brazil (born 1998

- Born: Ana Cristina Araujo Rodrigues; 14 December 1998 (age 27); Niterói, Brazil
- Division: Featherweight / light-featherweight
- Style: Brazilian Jiu-Jitsu
- Team: Dream Art; Alliance
- Rank: BJJ black belt

Anna Rodrigues is a Brazilian jiu-jitsu black belt competitor from Niterói, Brazil. Rodrigues is a Brazilian jiu-jitsu World Champion, a two-time IBJJF Pan champion and a Brasileiros Champion at black belt level.

== Grappling career ==
Rodrigues competes in the light-feather and featherweight divisions. She currently trains at Dream Art Project in Houston, Texas, having come up through the colored belt ranks at the Dream Art headquarters in São Paulo.

=== 2023 ===
Rodrigues competed in the 2023 World Jiu-Jitsu Championship on June 3 and 4, 2023 and won a silver medal in the featherweight division, losing out to Bianca Basilio in the final.

Rodrigues competed at the Tough Roll Winter Grand Prix on June 29, 2023, losing a decision to Nikki Lloyd-Griffiths.

Rodrigues won a gold medal in the light-featherweight division of the Abu Dhabi World Professional Jiu-Jitsu Championship 2023 on November 10, 2023.

=== 2024 ===
Rodrigues competed at the second ADCC South American Trials 2024 on March 9, 2024, where she won a gold medal at under 55 kg and was invited to the 2024 ADCC World Championship. Rodrigues then won a gold medal in the light-featherweight division at the Abu Dhabi Grand Slam - Rome on April 14, 2024.

Rodrigues was scheduled to defend her featherweight title against Bianca Basilio at BJJ Stars 12 on April 27, 2024. Basilio withdrew shortly before the event and was replaced by Ana Schmitt, and Rodrigues won the match on points to retain her title.

Rodrigues won a silver medal in the featherweight division of the IBJJF World Championship 2024 on June 1, 2024.

Rodrigues competed against Adele Fornarino in a superfight at Who's Number One 24 on June 20, 2024. She lost the match by submission.

Rodrigues defeated Alex Enriquez by decision and lost a decision to Bianca Basilio in the 2024 ADCC World Championship on August 17–18, 2024, forgoing the third-place match and accepting fourth-place.

=== 2025 ===
Rodrigues competed against Julia Alves in her return match at BJJ Stars 16 on July 25, 2025. She lost the match by decision.

== Competitive summary ==
Main achievements:

- IBJJF World Champion (2021)
- IBJJF Pan Champion (2021 / 2022 / 2023)
- IBJJF European Open Champion (2020 / 2022 / 2023)
- AJP Abu Dhabi World Pro Champion (November 2021)
- AJP South American Continental Pro Champion (2021)
- AJP Grand Slam Champion, LDN (2023)
- AJP Grand Slam Champion, MIA (2021)
- AJP Grand Slam Champion, RJ (2019)
- AJP Grand Slam Champion, LA (2019)
- 2nd IBJJF World Championship (2023)
- 2nd Place AJP Queen Of Mats (2019)

In coloured belts:

- IBJJF World Championship (2016 blue, 2018 purple, 2019 brown)
- IBJJF World Championship NoGi (2016 blue)
- IBJJF World Championship Juvenile (2015)
- IBJJF Pan Championship (2017 purple, 2018 / 2019 brown)
- IBJJF European Open (2017 purple
- CBJJ Brazilian Nationals (2016 blue, 2018 purple, 2019 brown)
- CBJJ Brazilian Nationals Juvenile (2014 / 2015)
- 2nd Place IBJJF World Championship Juvenile (2015*)
- 3rd Place IBJJF World Championship (2017 purple)
- 3rd Place IBJJF Pan Championship (2016 blue)
- 3rd Place CBJJ Brazilian Nationals (2016 blue*)
- 3rd Place AJP Abu Dhabi Pro (2019)
- 3rd Place AJP Grand Slam, RJ (2018)

== Instructor lineage ==
Carlos Gracie > Helio Gracie > Rolls Gracie > Romero Cavalcanti > Fábio Gurgel > Isaque Bahiense > Anna Rodrigues
