= Dream Art =

Brazilian jiu-jitsu academy and competition team

Dream Art Project
- Also known as: Dream Art Jiu-Jitsu
- Date founded: 2018
- Country of origin: Brazil
- Founder: Isaque Bahiense
- Current head: Paulo Miyao; Gabriel Figueiró (previous)
- Arts taught: Brazilian jiu-jitsu
- Official website: Dream Art SP

Dream Art is a Brazilian jiu-jitsu academy and team started in São Paulo, Brazil by BJJ world champion Isaque Bahiense.

Dream Art has produced numerous champions since its creation and is considered as one of the best jiu-jitsu teams in the world. Dream Art was the top scoring team for both male and female athletes at the 2023 World Jiu-Jitsu Championship, and ranked first in the 2022-2023 IBJJF Academy Rankings.

== Academy locations ==
The first Dream Art academy is in São Paulo and the team has affiliate academies in Spring, Texas; Conroe, Texas; Fullerton, California, Pensacola, Florida, and San Antonio, Texas

== History ==
The Dream Art Project was founded in São Paulo, Brazil in October 2018 by black belt world champion Isaque Bahiense with the support of Alliance Jiu Jitsu. It was started as a social project to support highly talented young jiu-jitsu athletes from low-income families, by providing them, in addition to BJJ training, with access to education, healthcare and English classes. Early on Alliance Manaus joined the Dream Art Project bringing grapplers such as Micael Galvao.

In September 2021 Dream Art announced their separation from Alliance. In 2022 Dream Art started collaborating with Aspire To Inspire in order to expand in the US. In July 2022, famed grappler Paulo Miyao became Dream Art's new head coach. In 2022 Dream Art athletes won a combined 154 gold medals, 70 silver medals and 42 bronze medals.

In 2023, Dream Art was the top scoring team for both male and female athletes at the 2023 World Jiu-Jitsu Championship, and ranked No. 1 in the IBJJF 2022-2023 Grand Slam Academy Rankings.

== Notable members ==
Dream Art current and former members include:

- Isaque Bahiense
- Nicholas Meregali
- Bia Mesquita
- Anna Rodrigues
