= Tainan Dalpra =

Brazilian jiu-jitsu practitioner

- Born: 6 November 2000 (age 25); Florianópolis, Brazil
- Division: Middleweight −82.3 kilograms (−181 lb)
- Style: Brazilian Jiu-Jitsu
- Team: Art of Jiu-Jitsu (AOJ)
- Rank: BJJ black belt

Tainan Dalpra Costa (born 6 November 2000) is a Brazilian jiu-jitsu black belt competitor. A winner of every major tournament as a colored belt, Dalpra is a three-time World, Pan American, and European champion. Dalpra is ranked No. 1 in the middleweight 2022-2023 IBJJF Gi Ranking.

== Early career ==
Tainan Dalpra was born in Florianópolis, Brazil. At the age of 5, his father started teaching him Brazilian jiu-jitsu. While competing at the IBJJF Pan Kids at the age of 13, while he was an orange belt, Dalpra met Rafael and Guilherme Mendes of the Art of Jiu-Jitsu Academy (AOJ) which runs one of the best jiu-jitsu kids programs in the world. In 2015 Dalpra moved to Costa Mesa, California joining AOJ's competition team and scholarship program under the guidance of the Mendes brothers. As a juvenile Dalpra won every competition that he joined including Pan Jiu-Jitsu and World Jiu-Jitsu. In 2018 he won double gold at every single competition in the adult division and was promoted to purple belt on the podium of the world championship.

== Black belt career ==
=== 2020-21 ===
In October 2020 Dalpra was promoted to black belt on the podium of the Pan championship by his coach Guilherme Mendes. In 2021 Dalpra won the World Championship, the Pan Championship, and the Abu Dhabi Grand Slam Miami. He also competed at BJJ Stars 6 on June 26, 2021, and submitted Athos Mirando with a lapel choke. He returned to the promotion at BJJ Stars 7 on November 6, 2021, where he submitted Lucas Gualberto with a toehold. He was then invited to compete in the IBJJF Middleweight Grand Prix on November 13, 2021. He defeated Renato Canuto 9-2 on points in the opening round and submitted Jonnatas Gracie with a choke in order to win the tournament.

=== 2022 ===
He then won the 2022 European Championship and the 2022 Pan Jiu-Jitsu Championship for the second time, a tournament he has now won at blue, purple, brown and black belt. In May, 2022 it was announced that Dalpra had a signed a contract to compete for ONE Championship in the future. Dalpra then won the IBJJF World Championship in the middleweight division for a second time in 2022. Dalpra was invited to compete in a superfight against Rodrigo Lopes at the IBJJF Middleweight Grand Prix on October 28, 2022. He submitted Lopes with an armbar at 4:22.

=== 2023 ===
Dalpra returned to the IBJJF European Championship in 2023, winning gold in the middleweight division. In March 2023 Dalpra faced Isaque Bahiense in a 30-minute superfight at the IBJJF FloGrappling Grand Prix in Austin, Texas. Dalpra won the match on points, 19–2.

On March 26, 2023, Dalpra won a gold medal in the middleweight division of the IBJJF Pan Championship 2023. He then competed in the Campeonato Brasileiro de Jiu-Jitsu on May 7, 2023, and won gold in the middleweight division.

Dalpra competed at the 2023 World Jiu-Jitsu Championship on June 3 and 4, winning a silver medal in the middleweight division. Dalpra's loss to Jansen Gomes, by way of tiebreaking advantages, 0x0, 2–0, in the final marked the first loss of his IBJJF black belt career. Dalpra returned to competition at the IBJJF Asian Championship 2023 on July 7 and won gold in the medium-heavyweight division. Dalpra then competed at the Tough Roll Winter Grand Prix on June 29, 2023, submitting Burak Sarman with a brabo choke.

Dalpra competed against Yan Paiva at the IBJJF Absolute Grand Prix on September 1, 2023. He won the match by submission.

Dalpra was invited to compete in the middleweight division of The Crown on November 19, 2023, alongside Jackson Nagai, Andy Murasaki, and Pedro Maia. He beat both opponents and won the division.

Dalpra announced that he was going to make his no gi debut in 2023, and was booked to compete against Troy Russell at Who's Number One 21: Ryan v Barbosa. He won the match by submission, with an armbar.

=== 2024 ===
Dalpra competed against Oliver Taza at Who's Number One 22 on February 9, 2024. He defeated Taza by decision.

Dalpra faced Mauricio Oliveira in a gi superfight at the IBJJF No Gi Absolute Grand Prix on February 29, 2024. He won the match by submission with a rear-naked choke.

Dalpra competed at middleweight in the IBJJF World Championship 2024, but he was disqualified in the quarter-final.

Dalpra competed against Jacob Rodriguez at Who's Number One 24 on June 20, 2024. He won the match by decision. He then won a gold medal in the middleweight division of the IBJJF Asian Championship 2024 on June 30, 2024.

Dalpra was scheduled to compete against Francisco Lo in the co-main event of BJJ Stars 13: Vikings Edition on August 3, 2024. He withdrew from the match on short notice and was replaced by Gabriel Galvao. Dalpra will now compete against Max Lindblad at Polaris 29 on September 7, 2024.

Dalpra competed in the middleweight division of The IBJJF: The Crown 2024 on November 17, 2024. He beat Gabriel Galvao and Elijah Dorsey but could not compete in the final due to an injury, so he finished with a silver medal.

=== 2025 ===
Dalpra won a gold medal in the middleweight division of the IBJJF European Championship 2025. He will now face Rene Sousa at Who's Number One 26 on February 7, 2025. He then won a gold medal in the middleweight division of the IBJJF Pan Championship 2025.

== Personal life ==
Dalpra is married to another Brazilian jiu-jitsu competitor, Sophia Dalpra.

== Philanthropy ==
Dalpra auctioned the unique gi he wore at the Campeonato Brasileiro de Jiu-Jitsu in 2023 to raise money for social projects in Brazil. The auction was completed on May 15, 2023, and the sale raised $4,000 for three different charities in Brazil.

== Brazilian Jiu-Jitsu competitive summary ==
Main Achievements (Black Belt):

- IBJJF World Champion (2021 / 2022)
- Brazilian National Champion (2023)
- 2 x IBJJF Pan Champion (2021 / 2022))
- IBJJF European Open Champion (2022)
- AJP Grand Slam Miami winner (2021)

Main Achievements (Colored Belts):

- IBJJF World Champion (2018 blue)
- 2nd Place IBJJF World Championship (2019 purple)
- IBJJF Pan Champion (2018 (Note: Weight and absolute) blue, 2019 purple)
- IBJJF European Champion (2019 purple, 2020 brown)
- Abu Dhabi Grand Slam Miami winner (2020 brown)
- Abu Dhabi Grand Slam Abu Dhabi winner (2018 purple)
- Abu Dhabi Grand Slam Los Angeles winner (2018 purple)
- Abu Dhabi World Pro Champion (2019 purple
- IBJJF Juvenile World Champion (2016 / 2017 (Note: Absolute))
- IBJJF Juvenile World Champion NoGi (2016)
- IBJJF Juvenile Pan Champion (2016 / 2017)
- 2nd Place IBJJF Juvenile World Championship (2017)

== Awards and honors ==
- 2021 Jitsmagazine Male Grappler of the Year (Gi)
- 2022 Jitsmagazine Male Grappler of the Year (Gi)
