= Bianca Basílio =

Brazilian jiu-jitsu and MMA practitioner (born 1996)

- Born: Bianca Barbosa Basílio; 2 February 1996 (age 30); Franca, São Paulo, Brazil
- Division: Featherweight (BJJ); Flyweight (MMA)
- Style: Brazilian Jiu-Jitsu
- Fighting out of: Brazil; Bahrain
- Team: Almeida/Atos Jiu-Jitsu; Team Bahrain (MMA)
- Rank: BJJ black belt

Other information
- Mixed martial arts record from Sherdog

Bianca Barbosa Basílio (born 2 February 1996) also known as Bia Basílio is a Brazilian submission grappler, mixed martial artist and Brazilian Jiu Jitsu (BJJ) black belt athlete.

A multiple time world champion in coloured belts, Basílio is a black belt two-time World Jiu-Jitsu Champion, two-time Pan American Champion, Brazilian National Champion, ADCC Submission Fighting World Champion and a three-time Abu Dhabi World Pro Champion.

== Early life ==
Bianca Barbosa Basílio was born on 2 February 1996 in Franca, Brazil, when she was a young age her family moved and settled in Itaquera.

== Career ==
=== Brazilian Jiu-Jitsu ===
After practicing gymnastic for a few years she discovered Jiu-Jitsu. From the age of 12 she started training with Diogo Almeida, the co-founder of Almeida JJ, at a social project in the back of his house. After receiving her orange belt brother Caio Almeida took over her training. At 15 she won her first world title in the blue belt junior division. In 2016, as a brown belt, Basílio won the Brazil Nationals, the Pan-American Championship and the World Jiu-Jitsu Championship, resulting in her promotion to black belt in December of the same year by her teachers, Caio and Diego Almeida. In June 2022 Basílio became the 2022 World Jiu-Jitsu Champion after defeating Amanda Canuto via advantages (0-0, 3-0 advantages).

==== 2023 onwards ====
Basilio was booked to compete against Tammi Musumeci in a strawweight submission grappling match at ONE Fight Night 8 on March 24, 2023. She lost the fight via unanimous decision.

Basilio then competed in the Campeonato Brasileiro de Jiu-Jitsu on May 7, 2023 and won gold in the featherweight division.

Basilio competed in the IBJJF World Championship 2023 on June 3 and 4, 2023 and won a gold medal in the featherweight division.

Basilio was scheduled to challenge Anna Rodrigues for the featherweight title at BJJ Stars 12 on April 27, 2024. However, she withdrew shortly before the event and was replaced by Ana Schmitt.

Basilio faced Nanami Ichikawa in a 132-pound submission grappling match on May 3, 2024, at ONE Fight Night 22. She won the match by submission in 35 seconds.

Basilio won gold medals in the no gi middleweight and absolute divisions at the IBJJF Sao Paulo Open 2024 on July 21, 2024.

Basilio was invited to compete in the under 55 kg division at the 2024 ADCC World Championship. She defeated Brenda Larissa and Anna Rodrigues by decision before being submitted by Adele Fornarino in the final and winning a silver medal. She returned in the women's absolute division and lost to Rafaela Guedes on points in the opening round.

=== Mixed Martial Arts (MMA) ===
In 2022, Basílio joined amateur mixed martial arts and joined Team Bahrain at the IMMAF Super Cup representing the Kingdom of Bahrain. She made her MMA debut in the quarterfinals after defeating Tajikistan's Shohona Ghozoeva in the opening round via armbar. Team Bahrain ended up MMA Super Cup champions after defeating team Ireland in the final.

Basilio announced at the beginning of 2023 that she was intending to make her professional MMA debut at some point that year.

== Championships and accomplishments ==
=== IMMAF ===
- Team Bahrain – Super Cup Gold Medalist 2022

== Mixed martial arts record ==
Professional record breakdown
2 matches	2 wins	0 losses
By submission	2	0

Res.	Record	Opponent	Method	Event	Date	Round	Time	Location	Notes
Win	2–0	Rafaela Guedes	Submission (rear-naked choke)	LFA 229	March 27, 2026	1	3:36	São Paulo, Brazil	
Win	1–0	Jéssica Oliveira	Submission (armbar)	LFA 225	January 23, 2026	1	4:58	Brasília, Brazil	Flyweight debut; Oliveira missed weight (128.6 lb).

Amateur record breakdown		
1 match	1 win	0 losses
By submission	1	0

Res.	Record	Opponent	Method	Event	Date	Round	Time	Location	Notes
Win	1–0	Shohona Ghozoeva	Submission (armbar)	2022 MMA Super Cup	March 9, 2022	1	1:03	Manama, Bahrain	

== Brazilian Jiu-Jitsu competitive summary ==
Main Achievements at black belt level:

- IBJJF World Champion (2022 / 2023)
- Brazilian National Champion (2023)
- IBJJF Pan-American Champion (2017 / 2021)
- Abu Dhabi World Pro Champion (2018 / 2019 / 2021)
- 2nd Place IBJJF World Championship (2019 / 2021)
- 2nd place IBJJF Pan Champion (2018 (Note: Absolute))
- 3rd place IBJJF Pan Championship (2018, 2019, (Note: Weight and absolute) 2021)
- 2 x Abu Dhabi Grand Slam Champion (Abu Dhabi 2019) (Rio 2018)

Main Achievements (Coloured Belts):

- IBJJF World Champion (2014 /2015 purple, 2016 brown)
- IBJJF European Champion (2015 purple)
- IBJJF Pan Champion (2015 purple, 2016 brown)
- IBJJF Juvenile Pan Champion (2013 blue)
- IBJJF Juvenile World Champion (2012–2013 blue)
- IBJJF Juvenile Brazilian Nationals Champion (2013 blue)
- 2nd place AJP Abu Dhabi Pro (2015–2016 brown/black)
- 2nd place IBJJF Pan Championship (2015 purple)
- 2nd place IBJJF Brazilian Nationals (2015 purple)
- 3rd place IBJJF World Championship (2014 purple)
- 3rd place IBJJF Pan Championship (2014 purple)
- 3rd place IBJJF Brazilian Nationals (2016 brown)

== Grappling competitive summary ==
- ADCC World Champion (2019)
