= Jessa Khan =

Cambodian ju-jitsu practitioner

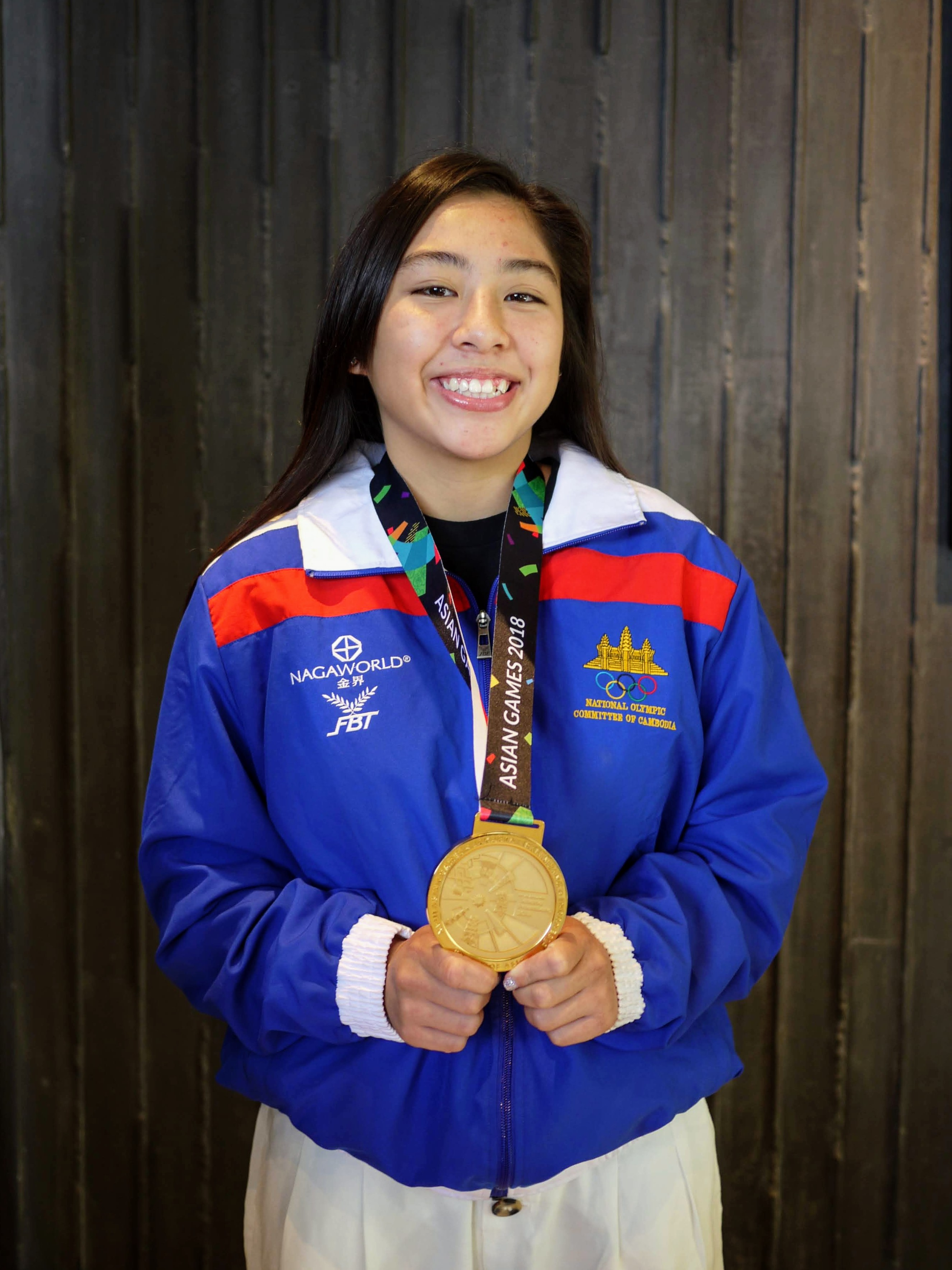

Personal information
- Nationality: Cambodian
- Born: 8 October 2001 (age 25) Texas, U.S.
- Height: 152 cm (5 ft 0 in)
- Weight: 49 kg (108 lb)

Sport
- Country: Cambodia
- Sport: Jujitsu
- Event: ne-waza
- Team: Art of Jiu-Jitsu (AOJ)
Medal record
Event	1st	2nd	3rd
Asian Games	1	0	0
Southeast Asian Games	2	1	0
European Championship	0	0	1
Total	3	1	1
Representing Cambodia
Jujutsu
Asian Games
Gold medal – first place	2018 Jakarta-Palembang	ne-waza 49kg
Southeast Asian Games
Gold medal – first place	2019 Philippines	ne-waza 49kg
Silver medal – second place	2023 Cambodia	ne-waza 52kg
No-gi Jiu-Jitsu
Southeast Asian Games
Gold medal – first place	2023 Cambodia	52kg
Brazilian Jiu-Jitsu
European Championship
Bronze medal – third place	2023 Paris, France	−48.5 kg

Jessamine Jada Khan (born 8 October 2001), often shortened as Jessa Khan (Khmer: ខាន់ ចេសា, romanized: Khăn Chésa [kʰan ceːsaː]), is an American-born Cambodian jiu-jitsu athlete. She is the 2023 IBJJF World Champion.

== Career ==
Khan represented Cambodia at the 2018 Asian Games and claimed a gold medal in the women's 49kg ne-waza event. This was also the first gold medal to be received by Cambodia which happened to be unexpected in the sport of ju-jitsu during the 2018 Asian Games. Khan is a second Gold Medal Cambodia's Asian Games history after Taekwondo Gold 2014. She is a daughter of a Mexican American mother with Cambodian American father. She began jiu-jitsu training at age 12.

On October 6, 2020, Khan was awarded her black belt in Brazilian Jiu-Jitsu by her coaches, the Mendes brothers, just two days before her nineteenth birthday.

== Personal life ==
Khan was born in Texas and resides in Southern California with her husband, fellow Art of Jiu Jitsu blackbelt Zach Kaina.

== Black belt career ==
On February 26, 2021, Khan made her debut appearance on Who's Number One, defeating Danielle Kelly by unanimous decision. She competed at Evolve Ur Game on April 3, 2021 in a superfight against Mayssa Bastos, losing on points. She returned to Who's Number One on May 28, 2021, defeating Patricia Fontes with an armbar. This performance earned Khan the invitation to compete for the inaugural WNO women's strawweight title at the WNO Championships. Khan submitted Jessica Crane with a heelhook in the opening round, but was submitted by Grace Gundrum in the semifinal with a twister and was submitted by Amanda 'Tubby' Alequin in the consolation match with a toehold.

In May, 2022 Khan became one of the first grapplers to sign a contract with ONE Championship. The promotion booked a rematch with Alequin for her debut at ONE 159 on July 22, 2022, but the match fell through when Alequin withdrew due to an undisclosed medical issue.

Khan competed in the 2023 Brazilian Jiu-Jitsu European Championship, winning a bronze medal in the women's roosterweight division. At the IBJJF Santa Cruz International Open on April 22nd, 2023, Khan won gold in the light-featherweight division. Khan returned to the Southeast Asian Games in 2023 to represent Cambodia once again, winning silver in the gi ne-waza event and gold in the no gi ne-waza event. She donated her winnings from the event to the Cambodian Red Cross.

Khan competed in the IBJJF World Championship 2023 on June 3 and 4, 2023 and won a gold medal in the light-featherweight division.

Khan was booked to compete against Danielle Kelly in a rematch for the inaugural ONE Championship Atomweight submission grappling title at ONE Fight Night 14 on September 29, 2023. Khan lost the match by decision.

Khan then competed at the IBJJF No-Gi World Championship 2023, where she won a silver medal in the light-featherweight division.
