= Margot Ciccarelli =

Brazilian jiu-jitsu practitioner from Italy

Margot Ciccarelli 鄧嘉寶
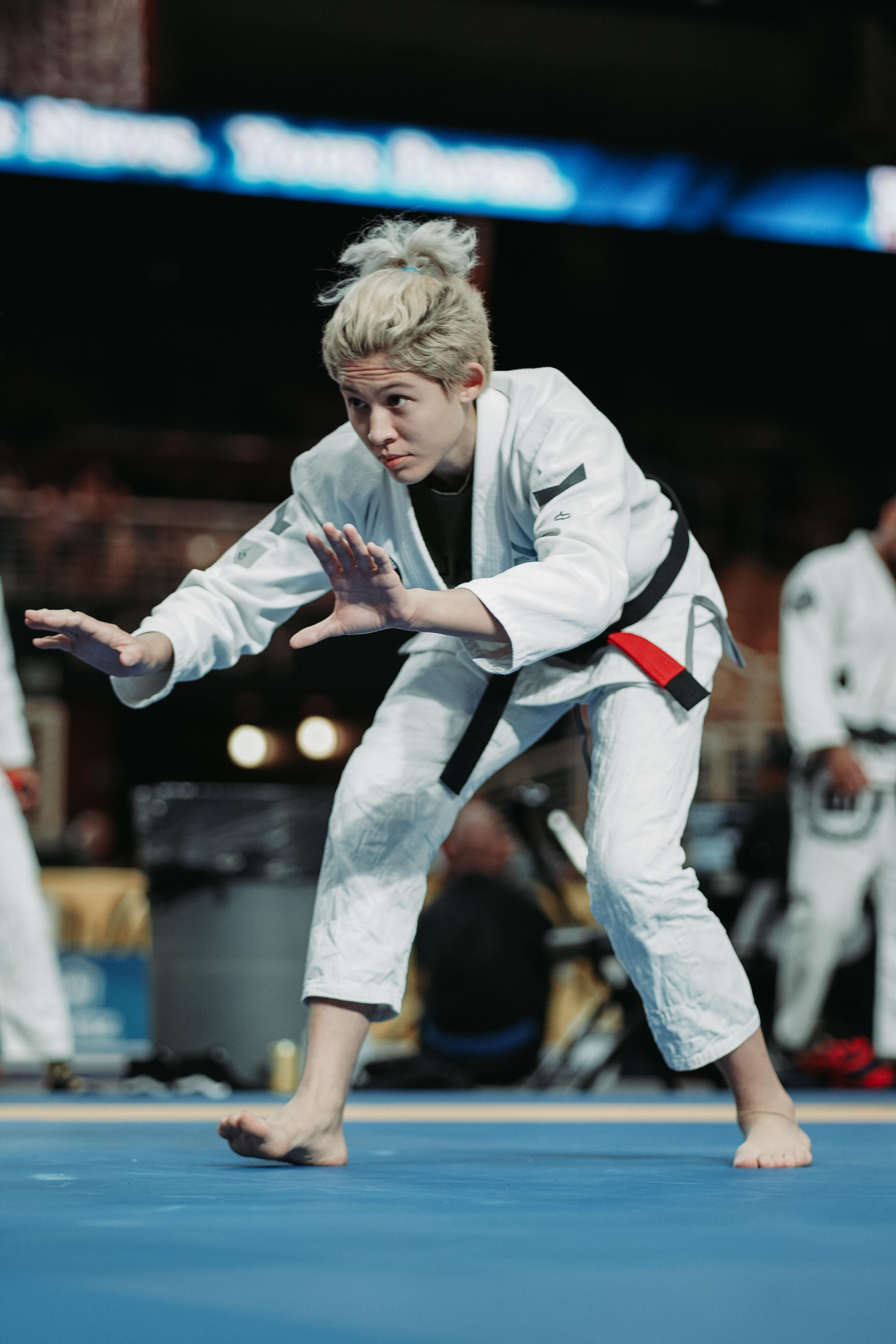
- Ciccarelli at the 2021 Pan Jiu-Jitsu Championship
- Born: 17 November 1993 (age 32); London, England
- Other names: Margot Ciccarelli-Tang, Mars
- Nationality: Chinese (Hong Kong), Italian
- Height: 1.70 m (5 ft 7 in)
- Division: Gi Weight Classes; Featherweight (−58.5 kg); Lightweight (−64 kg)
- Style: Brazilian Jiu-Jitsu
- Team: Art of Jiu-Jitsu (AOJ) (Since 2023); Unity Jiu Jitsu (2017—22); Atos Jiu-Jitsu
- Trainer: Guilherme Mendes; Murilo Santana
- Rank: BJJ black belt (Note: under Murilo Santana)

Other information
- Website: margotciccarelli.com

Margot Ciccarelli
- Traditional Chinese: 鄧嘉寶
- Simplified Chinese: 邓嘉宝
Transcriptions
Standard Mandarin
- Hanyu Pinyin: Dèng Jiābǎo
Yue: Cantonese
- Yale Romanization: dahng gā bóu
- Jyutping: dang6 gaa1 bou2

Margot Ciccarelli (Chinese: 鄧嘉寶; pinyin: Dèng Jiābǎo; born 17 November 1993) is a Brazilian jiu-jitsu competitor and coach.

Representing Italy, she is a multiple-time World, World Pro, World No-Gi and European Champion in the lower belt divisions. At black belt, Ciccarelli is a European Champion and Asian Open Champion, as well as four-time World Championship and three-time Pan American Championship medalist.

== Early life and education ==
Ciccarelli was born on 17 November 1993 and raised in London, the daughter of an Italian father and a Chinese mother. Ciccarelli learned Wushu from the age of 6 before progressing to Chinese kickboxing and Wing Chun Kung Fu. She took her first jiu-jitsu class at Mill Hill BJJ just before her 19th birthday.

== Early career ==
Ciccarelli trained in various academies around the world during her coloured belt years. She was promoted to blue belt in Hong Kong (under Atos) during her gap year and purple belt in London (under Legacy BJJ / Inglorious Grapplers in Moorgate) during university. In May 2017, she joined New York based team Unity Jiu Jitsu and started training under Murilo Santana.

As a purple belt, she won the IBJJF World Championship twice, the European Championship twice, the Asian Open Championship three times and the Abu Dhabi World Professional Championship twice. After receiving her brown belt from Santana in 2019, she won the World No-Gi Championship, the European Championship, the Pan No-Gi Championship and the 2020 American National Championship in both Gi and No-Gi in a year where the World Championship was not held.

== Black belt career ==
=== 2021–2022 ===
Ciccarelli was promoted to black belt in May 2021 by Murilo Santana. In her first six months at black belt, she won silver at the Abu Dhabi World Professional Championship, silver at the Pan American Championship and bronze at the World Championship losing to Beatriz Mesquita in the semi-final by referee's decision (0x0 pts). Ciccarelli won bronze at the 2022 European Championship taking place in Rome, then bronze at the 2022 World Jiu-Jitsu Championship. In October 2022, she moved to California to train under Guilherme Mendes at the Art of Jiu Jitsu.

=== 2023–2025 ===
In March 2023, Ciccarelli won a silver medal in the featherweight division of the IBJJF Pan Championship. She went on to compete at the IBJJF World Championship in June, earning a bronze medal in the featherweight division after losing a close match to Anna Rodrigues. The following month, she won gold in the lightweight division at the IBJJF Asian Championship.

In October 2023, Ciccarelli claimed the lightweight title at the IBJJF Orange County Open. She added another major title in January 2024 by winning gold in the featherweight division of the IBJJF European Championship.

At the ADCC European, Middle-Eastern, and African Trials in February 2024, Ciccarelli won gold in the under-55 kg division, earning an invitation to the 2024 ADCC World Championship. She went on to win a bronze medal in the featherweight division of the IBJJF World Championship in June 2024, before securing gold later that month in the lightweight division at the IBJJF No-Gi American National Championship.

In August 2024, Ciccarelli competed at the ADCC World Championship, where she lost a decision to Jasmine Rocha in the opening round of the under-55 kg division. She was later scheduled to compete at the second edition of The Crown in November but withdrew before the event. The following year, she won a silver medal in the lightweight division of the IBJJF Brazilian National Championship.

== Style ==
While training jiu-jitsu, Ciccarelli also practised a variety of movement-based activities such as contemporary dance, hip hop dance and circus skills including flying trapeze and aerial straps. According to Ciccarelli, her aim is "to win with beautiful, superior movement quality and not just win for winning's sake."

== Personal life ==
Ciccarelli identifies as pansexual.

== Brazilian jiu-jitsu competitive summary ==
Main Achievements (at black belt level):

- 1st place at European Champion
- 1st place at Asian Open Championship (weight and absolute)
- 2nd place at Pan American Championship (2021 / 2023)
- 2nd place at Abu Dhabi World Professional Championship (2021)
- 3rd place at World Championship (2021 / 2022 / 2023)
- 3rd place at Pan American Championship (2022)

Main Achievements (at coloured belt level):

- 2x World Champion (2018, 2019 purple belt)
- World No-Gi Champion (2019 brown belt)
- 2x Abu Dhabi World Professional Champion (2018, 2019 purple belt)
- 3x European Champion (2017, 2018 purple belt, 2020 brown belt)
- Pan No-Gi Champion (2021 brown belt)
- American National Champion (2020 brown belt)
- American National No-Gi Champion (2020 brown belt)
- 3x Asian Champion (2016, 2017, 2018 purple belt)
- Pan Pacific Champion (2016 purple belt)

== Instructor lineage ==
Rickson Gracie → Marcelo Behring → Mario Yamasaki → Murilo Santana → Margot Ciccarelli
