= Mayssa Bastos =

Brazilian jiu-jitsu practitioner from Brazil

- Born: 23 October 1997 (age 29)
- Nickname: Pequena Notável (Note: Her nickname translates in English as "the remarkable little one".)
- Division: GI Weight Classes: Rooster (−48.5 kg); Light Feather (−53.5 kg); No-GI Weight Classes: Rooster (−46.5 kg); Light Feather (−51.5 kg)
- Style: Brazilian Jiu-Jitsu
- Team: Art of Jiu Jitsu; Unity Jiu Jitsu; GFTeam
- Trainer: Rafael and Guilherme Mendes; Murilo Santana; Júlio César
- Rank: BJJ black belt

Mayssa Bastos (born 23 October 1997) is a Brazilian submission grappler and black belt Brazilian jiu-jitsu competitor. Bastos has won almost every single major jiu-jitsu tournaments in both Gi and No-Gi. She is the current roosterweight World Champion, World No-Gi Champion, Pan American Champion and the light-featherweight European Champion. She also competes in ONE Championship where she became the ONE Atomweight Submission Grappling World Champion.

== Early life ==
Mayssa Caldas Pereira Bastos was born on 23 October 1997, in Niterói, Brazil. As a child she trained in Judo alongside her older brother before she started Brazilian jiu-jitsu at the age of twelve at a Grappling Fight Team (GFTeam) school under coach Jair Court in Maricá, Rio de Janeiro. Bastos also visited another school location in Méier to train with legendary 7th-degree coral belt Julio Cesar. As a blue belt she won double gold at both the IBJJF Juvenile Pan-American and at the European Championship; before earning her purple belt she won silver at the Juvenile World championship. As a purple belt Bastos won two world championships as well as the European and the Pan Championships in both 2015 and 2016. As a brown belt Bastos won the Abu Dhabi World Pro, followed by UAEJJF Grand Slam Abu Dhabi and UAEJJF Grand Slam Los Angeles. She then won the European Open, the Pan-American Championship and earned bronze at the 2017 World Championship.

To prepare for her fights outside of Brazil, Bastos started training with Murilo Santana at Unity JJ in New York City as well as at GFTeam Orange County on the west coast. She was promoted to black belt on 4 June 2018 by Júlio César right after winning silver at the 2018 World Championship in the brown belt division.

== Black belt career ==
At the 2019 World Championship Bastos won her first title as a black belt, defeating four time world champion Rikako Yuasa in the final. By the age of 23 Bastos had won almost every single major jiu-jitsu tournaments in both GI and No-GI, for most of them more than once. Bastos won three consecutive No-Gi World title without having a single lost in No-Gi matches as a black belt.

=== 2021-2022 ===
In 2021 she won Who's Number One in the 115 pounds (52 kg) division after defeating Grace Gundrum and the Eddie Bravo Invitational (EBI) becoming its first straw-weight champion. Competing under ADCC rules for the first time, in February 2022 Bastos won the ADCC Submission Fighting 2nd South American Trials in the −60 kg division. At the 2022 European Championship, Bastos defeated Checkmat’s Rose El Sharouni in the final to become European Champion in the light feather weight division (−53.5 kg), that same year Bastos qualified for the 2022 ADCC World Championship after winning the 2nd South American Trials and won the Pan Championship for the third time. In June of the same year she became World Champion for the third time after defeating Brenda Larissa via points (6–4).

=== 2023 ===
Bastos competed in the 2023 IBJJF European Championship, winning gold in the light-featherweight division. On March 26, 2023, Bastos won a gold medal in the light-featherweight division of the IBJJF Pan Championship 2023. She then competed in the Campeonato Brasileiro de Jiu-Jitsu on May 7, 2023 and won gold in the light-featherweight division. After this win, Bastos announced that she would be switching teams to Art of Jiu Jitsu to train under Rafael and Guilherme Mendes.

Bastos competed in the IBJJF World Championship 2023 on June 3 and 4, 2023 and won a gold medal in the roosterweight division. She then competed at the IBJJF Asian Championship 2023 on July 7 and won a gold medal in the light-featherweight division. Bastos competed at the IBJJF Jiu-Jitsu Con International on September 1, 2023, winning a gold medal in the light-featherweight division.

Bastos won a gold medal in the roostweight division of the Abu Dhabi World Professional Jiu-Jitsu Championship 2023 on November 10, 2023. She then competed at the IBJJF No-Gi World Championship 2023, where she won the roosterweight division.

=== 2024 ===
Bastos won a gold medal in the roosterweight division of the Abu Dhabi Grand Slam Tokyo on January 14, 2024. She then competed in the light-featherweight division of the IBJJF European Championship on January 27, 2024, winning a silver medal.

Bastos made her ONE Championship debut against Kanae Yamada at ONE Fight Night 20 on March 8, 2024. She won the match by decision.

Bastos won a gold medal in the light-featherweight division of the IBJJF Pan Championship 2024 on March 24, 2024.

Bastos won a gold medal in the roosterweight division of the IBJJF World Championship 2024 on June 1, 2024, marking her 5th consecutive title. She then won a gold medal in the light-featherweight division of the IBJJF Asian Championship 2024 on June 30, 2024.

Bastos faced Danielle Kelly for the ONE Women's Atomweight Submission Grappling World Championship at ONE Fight Night 24 on August 3, 2024. She won the fight via unanimous decision and earned the $50,000 Performance of the Night bonus.

Bastos was invited to compete in the under 55 kg division at the 2024 ADCC World Championship. She lost to Adele Fornarino by decision in the opening round.

Bastos defended her ONE Women's Atomweight Submission Grappling World Title against Danielle Kelly in a rematch on December 6, 2024 at ONE Fight Night 26. She won the match by decision.

Bastos won a gold medal in the light-featherweight division at the IBJJF No Gi World Championship 2024.

=== 2025 ===
Bastos won a gold medal in the light-featherweight division of the IBJJF European Championship 2025. She then won a bronze medal in the light-featherweight division of the IBJJF Pan Championship 2025.

== Brazilian Jiu-Jitsu competitive summary ==
Main Achievements (Black Belt)

- 5 x IBJJF World Champion (2019 / 2021 / 2022 / 2023 / 2024)
- 4 x IBJJF Pans Champion (2019 / 2020 / 2022 / 2023 / 2024)
- IBJJF Asian Open Champion (2018)
- 4 x IBJJF European Open Champion (2019–2020–2022-2023)
- IBJJF American Nationals Champion (2018)
- 4 x IBJJF World No-GI Champion (2018 / 2019 / 2021 / 2022)
- 2 x IBJJF Pans Championship No-Gi Champion (2018–2021)
- AJP Abu Dhabi World Pro Champion (2017 / 2018 / 2019)
- AJP Grand Slam winner, Moscow (2019)
- AJP Grand Slam winner, Tokyo (2018)
- AJP Grand Slam winner, Miami (2020–2021)
- AJP Grand Slam winner, Rio De Janeiro (2018)
- ADCC 2nd South American Trials winner (2022)
- CBJJ Brazilian Nationals No-Gi Champion (2018)
- 2nd Place IBJJF Pan Championship (2021)
- 2nd Place CBJJ Brazilian Nationals Championship (2019)

Main Achievements (Coloured Belts)

- IBJJF World Champion (2015–2016 purple)
- IBJJF World Champion Juvenile (2014 (Note: Absolute) blue)
- IBJJF European Open Champion(2015–2016 purple, 2017–2018 brown)
- IBJJF Pans Champion (2015–2016 purple, 2018 brown)
- IBJJF European Open Juvenile Champion(2014 (Note: Weight and absolute) blue)
- IBJJF Pans Championship Juvenile Champion(2014 blue)
- UAEJJF Abu Dhabi World Pro (2018 brown/black)
- UAEJJF Grand Slam, Abu Dhabi (2018 brown)
- UAEJJF Grand Slam, Los Angeles (2017 brown)
- UAEJJF South America Continental Pro (2018 brown)
- 2nd place IBJJF World Championship (2018 brown)
- 2nd place IBJJF European Open (2015 purple)
- 2nd place IBJJF World Championship Juvenile (2014 blue)
- 3rd place IBJJF World Championship (2018/2017 brown)
- 3rd place IBJJF European Open (2016 purple, 2017 brown)
- 3rd place IBJJF Pans Championship (2016 purple)

== Instructor lineage ==
Luis França > Oswaldo Fadda > Monir Salomão > Júlio César > Mayssa Bastos
