= Zenith BJJ =

Brazilian jiu-jitsu academy and competition team

- Date founded: 2013
- Country of origin: USA
- Founder: Robert Drysdale, Rodrigo Cavaca
- Current head: Robert Drysdale
- Arts taught: Brazilian jiu-jitsu, Grappling
- Practitioners: Robert Drysdale; Amy Campo
- Official website: zenithbjj.com.br

Zenith BJJ is a Brazilian jiu-jitsu association and team started in 2013 by black belt World champions Robert Drysdale and Rodrigo Cavaca. Drysdale runs Zenith Las Vegas and Cavaca runs Zenith Santos in Brazil, with more affiliates in the US, Canada, Central America, South America, Europe and Australia.

== History ==
Zenith BJJ was established in 2013 after Rodrigo Cavaca left the Checkmat team to start a new team alongside his friend Robert Drysdale. Both founders were teammates and trained Brazilian jiu-jitsu together at Brasa Clube de Jiujitsu in Brazil.

The Zenith BJJ main academy and headquarters is located in Las Vegas, Nevada. Zenith BJJ was one of the top 10 teams of the women's division at the 2021 World Jiu-Jitsu Championship.

== Notable members ==
A list of current and former members:

- Robert Drysdale
- Rodrigo Cavaca
- Amy Campo
- Paulo Rezende
- Marcelo Nunes
- Fellipe Andrew

== See also ==
- Brazilian jiu-jitsu
- Grappling
