= GFTeam =

Brazilian jiu-jitsu academy and competition team

Grappling Fight Team
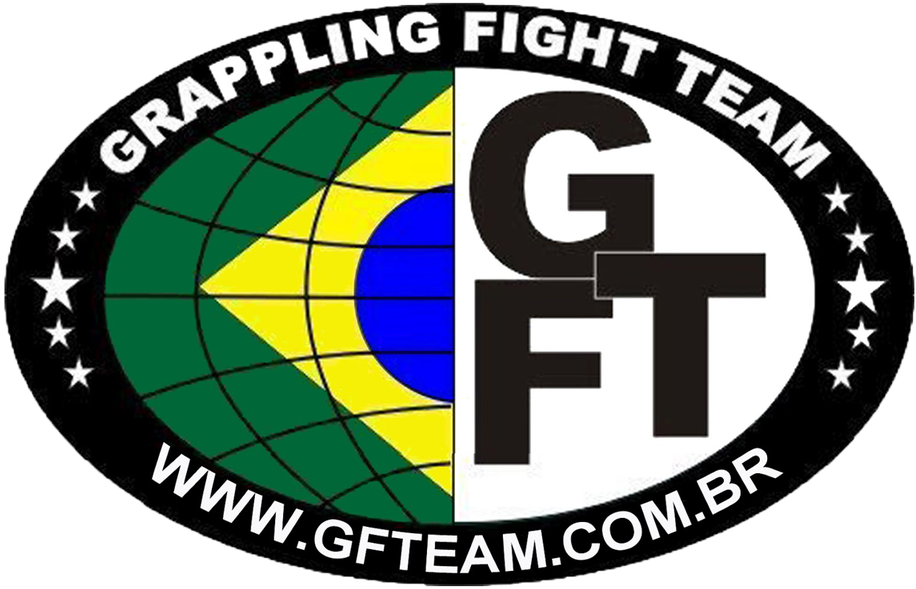
- Also known as: GFTeam
- Date founded: 2007
- Country of origin: Brazil
- Founder: Julio Cesar Pereira
- Current head: Julio Cesar Pereira; Marcus Bello; Alexandre Baraúna
- Arts taught: Brazilian jiu-jitsu
- Ancestor schools: Universidade Gama Filho
- Official website: https://www.gfteamofficial.com.br/

Grappling Fight Team (most commonly known as GFTeam) is a Brazilian jiu-jitsu (BJJ) academy and team.

== History ==
It was started in 1993 as part of Universidade Gama Filho, a university in Rio de Janeiro as Universidade Gama Filho (UGF) or Gama Filho Jiu-Jitsu.

It was developed under coaches Pedro Gama Filho and Paulo Jardim then under Julio Cesar Pereira, Marcus Bello and Alexandre Baraúna. In 2004 the team cut ties with the university following the death of Pedro Filho, in 2007 Julio Cesar founded Grappling Fight Team or GFTeam. GF Team headquarter is located in Bairro do Meier, Rio de Janeiro. Grappling fight team has more than 30 affiliate academies in the world.

In 2023, GFTeam was ranked No.9 for male and No.2 for female athletes at the 2023 World Jiu-Jitsu Championship. GFTeam was ranked No.3 in the IBJJF Top 10 Academy Rankings for the 2022/2023 season.

On September 13, 2023, GFTeam announced that they were merging with JiuArt in order to form a new competition team.

== Notable members ==
Current and former members:

- Thamires Aquino
- Alexandre Barauna
- Mayssa Bastos
- Marcus Bello
- Claudio Calasans
- Jaime Canuto
- Ricardo Evangelista
- Dante Leon
- Amanda Monteiro Canuto
- Thiago Borges
- Denilson Pimenta
- Rafaela Pires
- Rodolfo Vieira
