= Art of Jiu Jitsu =

Brazilian jiu-jitsu academy and competition team

Art of Jiu-Jitsu
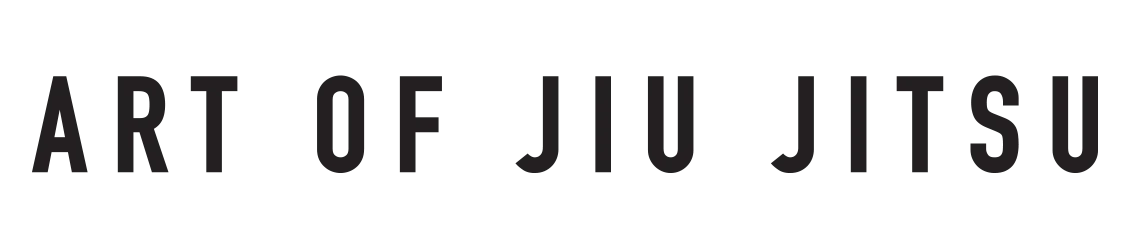
- Also known as: AOJ
- Date founded: 2012
- Country of origin: US
- Founder: Rafael and Guilherme Mendes
- Arts taught: Brazilian jiu-jitsu
- Practitioners: Jessa Khan; Tainan Dalpra
- Official website: artofjiujitsu.com

Art of Jiu-Jitsu (AOJ) is a Brazilian jiu-jitsu academy and team started in 2012 by black belt world champion brothers Rafael and Guilherme Mendes together with RVCA founder PM Tenore.

== History ==
The Art of Jiu Jitsu (AOJ) academy was established in 2012 by Rafael and Guilherme Mendes, in collaboration with RVCA founder PM Tenore, originally as an affiliate of Atos Jiu-Jitsu. The academy is located in Costa Mesa, California.

In 2015, the Mendes brothers started a training scholarship to provide select juvenile athletes full room and board, assistance with event registration and travel, and the opportunity to train with one of the world's top competitive teams. The first two athletes to be recruited were Caio Antonini and Johnatha Alves, chosen out of 1,000 applicants. Recipients of the scholarship later included Tainan Dalpra.

In 2015 and 2016 the Mendes brothers retired from their competitive careers, after winning 10 world titles between them, to focus on their academy.

The academy became known for its strong children's program, among their first students were twin brothers Tye and Kade Ruotolo who trained at AOJ between the age of 10 and 14, before transferring to Atos’ adult program in 2017.

During the 2020 IBJJF European Championship taking place in January, AOJ athletes started competing under "Art of Jiu Jitsu", instead of Atos; the following month, AOJ officially split from Atos becoming its own affiliation. The same year, the brothers promoted the first black belts from the kid's program, Jessa Khan and Tainan Dalpra who started at AOJ through the Believe & Achieve program.

As a black belt, Dalpra won the 2021 IBJJF World Championship. The following year, Dalpra and Thalison Soares won the 2022 IBJJF World Championship representing AOJ. The AOJ men's team came fourth at the 2022 World Jiu-Jitsu Championship.

In April 2023, the Mendes brothers announced that they would be opening a second Art of Jiu Jitsu location. AOJ Mission Viejo, the brand's second location opened its doors on March 11, 2024.

At the 2023 IBJJF World Jiu-Jitsu Championship AOJ had six black belt finalists, four of whom won gold including Diego Oliveira Bautista, Johnatha Alves, Mayssa Bastos and Jessa Khan - all of them issued of a single academy. AOJ won 'Gym of the Year' at the JitsMagazine BJJ Awards in 2023

== Notable members ==
A list of current and former members:

- Cole Abate
- Margot Ciccarelli
- Tainan Dalpra
- Jessa Khan
- Mikey Musumeci
- Tammi Musumeci
- Tye Ruotolo
- Kade Ruotolo
- Yuuga Frausto
