= Samantha Cook =

Brazilian jiu-jitsu practitioner from England

- Born: 10 November 1987 (age 38); Kingswood, England
- Division: Middleweight Gi −69 kilograms (−152 lb); Middleweight No-Gi −66.5 kilograms (−147 lb)
- Style: Brazilian Jiu-Jitsu
- Team: Checkmat / Fight Zone London
- Trainer: Marco Canha; Chico Mendes
- Rank: BJJ black belt

Samantha Cook (born 10 November 1987) is a Brazilian jiu-jitsu black belt competitor. Cook is a No-Gi World champion, a four-time European champion and a four-time British champion in coloured belts. The first British female to win the ADCC Trials in the black belt division, she is a multiple time World Medalist and the 2019 European Champion in both Gi and No-Gi.

== Career ==
Samantha Lea Cook was born in Kingswood near Bristol, England. During her youth she started in judo then competed in show jumping. At the age of 21 she discovered Brazilian jiu-jitsu and after moving to Bristol in 2008, started training under Checkmat's Chico Mendes.

In 2014 Cook won the European Championship for the first time as a purple belt. At the 2015 IBJJF/UKBJJF British Nationals, she won quadruple gold after winning in two divisions in Gi and No-Gi, that same year she moved to London joining Checkmat's affiliate Fight Factory then Fightzone London under Marco Canha. She pursued her training in the evenings while working as a Respiratory therapist at the National Hospital for Neurology and Neurosurgery. As a brown belt Cook won gold at the ADCC European Trials, the first British women to do so at black belt level; then won the 2017 European Open (Gi and No-Gi) followed by a double silver medal at the 2017 World Championship in both her weight division and in absolute.

Her promotion to black belt took place in June 2017. In August, debuting at black belt at Polaris Pro Grappling 5, in a Gi Match at 64 kg, she defeated Nottingham's Vanessa English by judges decision. In July 2018 she won gold at the Abu Dhabi Grand Slam Tokyo in the 70 kg division, after defeating Claudia do Val, and gold at the 2018 UAEJJF Grand Slam Abu Dhabi after submitting Thamara Silva. At Polaris 7 she lost a No-Gi match to Finland's world champion Venla Luukkonen after a split judges decision. Cook won bronze at the 2018 IBJJF World Championship then gold at the 2019 European Championship in both Gi and No-Gi (as well as bronze in No-Gi absolute). In 2019 she won bronze again at the World Championship, bronze at the Abu Dhabi World Pro, followed by silver at the UAEJJF Grand Slam, Abu Dhabi. That same year, Cook won gold at the UAEJJF British National Pro and gold at the UAEJJF Netherland National Pro.

== Brazilian Jiu-Jitsu competitive summary ==
Main Achievements (Black Belt)

- IBJJF European Open Champion (2019)
- IBJJF European No-Gi Champion (2019)
- UAEJJF Grand Slam, Tokyo (2018)
- UAEJJF Grand Slam, Abu Dhabi (2018)
- 2nd place UAEJJF Grand Slam, Abu Dhabi (2019)
- 2nd place UAEJJF Grand Slam, London (2019)
- 2nd place UAEJJF Grand Slam, Los Angeles (2018)
- 3rd place IBJJF World Championship (2018 / 2019)
- 3rd place UAEJJF World Pro (2019)

Main Achievements (Coloured Belts)

- IBJJF World No Gi Champion (2015 brown)
- ADCC European Trials winner (2017)
- IBJJF European Open Champion (2017 / 2016 brown, 2015 / 2014 purple)
- IBJJF European Open No-Gi Champion (2017 (Note: Absolute) brown)
- UAEJJF Abu Dhabi Grand Slam winner (2016 brown)
- UKBJJF/IBJJF British Nationals Champion (2015 (Note: Weight and absolute) purple)
- UKBJJF/IBJJF British Nationals No-Gi Champion(2015 purple)
- 2nd place IBJJF World Championship (2017/ 2016 brown)
- 2nd place IBJJF World Championship No-Gi (2016 brown)
- 2nd place UAEJJF Abu Dhabi Grand Slam (2017 brown)

== Instructor lineage ==
Helio Gracie > Rolls Gracie > Romero Cavalcanti (Jacaré) > Ricardo Vieira > Marco Canha > Samantha Cook
