= Kendall Reusing =

Brazilian jiu-jitsu practitioner from the US

- Born: Kendall Marie Reusing; 29 October 1997 (age 28)
- Nationality: American
- Height: 5 ft 9 in (175 cm)
- Division: Gi weight class; Super Heavyweight; +79.3 kg (174.8 lb)
- Style: Brazilian Jiu-Jitsu
- Team: Gracie Barra
- Trainer: Tom Reusing
- Rank: BJJ black belt

Kendall Reusing (born 29 October 1997) is an American grappler and Brazilian jiu-jitsu black belt competitor. A former freestyle wrestler, Reusing is a five-time Brazilian jiu-jitsu world champion in colored belt and a two-time no-gi Jiu-Jitsu black belt world champion.

== Early career ==
Kendall Marie Reusing was born on 29 October 1997 in Dana Point, California, the daughter of accomplished Brazilian jiu-jitsu competitor Tom Reusing and Holly McClung Reusing. From a young age she trained in Judo and Brazilian Jiu-jitsu.

As a teenager, Reusing won the 2015 California state high school wrestling championship and four US national high school wrestling championships. During that time she also joined Team USA as a freestyle wrestler on the Cadet National Team, Cadet World Team, and then twice on the Junior National Team. By the end of 11th grade, she was the highest-ranked girl on TrackWrestling's Elite Athlete list and had twice been named Press-Enterprise Girls Wrestler of the Year.

She wrestled for a year at Simon Fraser University in Canada before returning to Jiu-Jitsu full-time in 2016. She won numerous championships—including double gold at the 2018 World No-Gi championship as a brown belt—before getting promoted to black belt in 2019.

== Black belt career ==
=== 2019–20 ===
During her first year as black belt, Reusing won gold at the World No-Gi Championship and silver in the open-weight division; she then finished second at the UAEJJF Grand Slam L.A. before winning the SJJIF World Jiu-Jitsu Championship.

Reusing represented Gracie Barra alongside Felipe Trovo and Carlos Souza in the team grappling event Subversiv 3 on August 28, 2020. Reusing defeated all four of her opponents at the event and Gracie Barra won the tournament. She was then invited to compete against Leah Taylor in the co-main event of Submission Underground 18 on October 4, 2020. Reusing won the match by submission in EBI overtime.

=== 2021 ===
On March 27, 2021, Reusing fought Nathiely de Jesus in the main event of Fight 2 Win 168, losing the match by submission. She then returned to team grappling as part of the Gracie Barra team at Subversiv 5 on May 1, 2021. Reusing won her match against Maggie Grindatti, but her teammates both lost and Gracie Barra were eliminated in the opening round. Reusing fought Talita Nogueira in the co-main event of Fight 2 Win 173 on June 11, 2021, and won the match by submission with a choke. She returned at Fight 2 Win 177 on July 16, 2021, and fought Maria Malyjasiak in the co-main event, losing by submission.

In October 2021 Reusing won the Inaugural Polaris Women's Openweight championship by defeating Venla Luukkonen via Submission, the following month she won the ADCC North American Championship in the 60 kg+ division. Although victory at this trial did not guarantee an invite to the 2022 ADCC World Championship, Reusing was given an invite to the event as a result of her performance. She was also invited to compete in the Heavyweight division at the Who's Number One Championships on September 25 and 26, 2021. Reusing won her first two matches but lost to Rafaela Guedes in the final, taking second place at the tournament. During Worlds 2021 she did not compete but served as a commentator for FloSports. At the Pan-American No-Gi Championship, she won gold in her division and silver in the open-weight division.

=== 2022 ===
Reusing was invited to compete against Ffion Davies for the inaugural women's openweight title in the co-main event of Grapplefest 11 on February 26, 2022. She won the match by decision and became the promotion's first openweight champion. Reusing was then booked to defend her Polaris title against Amanda Leve at Polaris 19 on March 26, 2022. She retained the title after her opponent Leve forfeited due to an injury.

At the 2022 ADCC World Championship Reusing dominated her first match against Giovana Jara then got a knee injury following a failed takedown in the semi-final, losing via retirement from the match. Reusing would have been eligible to compete for the bronze medal, but was unable to do so due to the injury she sustained in the previous match and had to forfeit.

=== 2023 ===
Reusing returned to competition to defend her Polaris openweight title against Leticia Cardozo in the co-main event Polaris 26 on November 4, 2023. She won the match by decision and retained the title. She then competed at the IBJJF No-Gi World Championship 2023, where she won the super-heavyweight division for the second time.

=== 2024 ===
Reusing won the under 90 kg division at the USA Grappling World Team Trials on June 22, 2024.

Reusing was invited to compete in the over 65 kg division at the 2024 ADCC World Championship. She submitted Maria Ruffatto in the opening round and was submitted by Rafaela Guedes in the semi-final, but she beat Amy Campo on points to win a bronze medal. She also entered the women's absolute division and was submitted by Beatriz 'Bia' Mesquita in the opening round.

Reusing won the under 90 kg division at the UWW No Gi Grappling World Championship on October 12, 2024.

== Brazilian Jiu-Jitsu competitive summary ==
Main Achievements at black belt level:

- IBJJF World Champion No-Gi (2023)
- IBJJF World Champion No-Gi (2019)
- 2nd Place IBJJF World Championship No-Gi (2019 (Note: Open weight division))
- IBJJF Pan Champion No-Gi (2021)
- 2nd place IBJJF Pan Champion No-Gi (2021)
- SJJIF World Champion (2019)
- 2nd place UAEJJF Grand Slam, LA (2019)

Main Achievements (Coloured Belts):

- 2x IBJJF World Champion No-Gi (2018 brown)
- IBJJF World Champion (2017 purple)
- 2x IBJJF World Champion No-Gi (2016 blue)
- UAEJJF Abu Dhabi Pro Champion (2018 purple)
- 2nd place IBJJF World Championship (2017 purple)
- 2nd place IBJJF Pans Championship (2018 brown)
- 2nd place UAEJJF Grand Slam, LA (2018 brown)
- 3rd place IBJJF Pans Championship (2018 brown)

== Instructor lineage ==
Helio Gracie > Carlos Gracie Jr. > Nelson Monteiro > Tom Reusing > Kendall Reusing
