= Polaris Pro Grappling =

Brazilian Jiu-Jitsu competitions

- Type: Private
- Industry: Grappling promotion Tournament Competition
- Founded: 2015; 11 years ago
- Founders: Matthew Benyon, Ben Tong, Gareth Dummer, Lee Jones
- Headquarters: Bournemouth, England, UK
- Key people: Matthew Benyon, Ben Tong, Gareth Dummer, Lee Jones, Sophie Hudson, Michael Steven
- Website: polarisprograppling.com

Polaris Pro Grappling is Europe's longest running large-scale professional grappling event. They have organized dozens of events, primarily in the UK but also elsewhere in Europe. The promotion has produced events with a variety of different formats like regular fight-nights, grand prix tournaments, and team grappling matches.

Polaris has attracted some of the biggest names from Brazilian Jiu-jitsu, Grappling and Mixed Martial Arts including Keenan Cornelius, Michelle Nicolini, Brad Pickett, Rousimar Palhares, Dean Lister, Masakazu Imanari, Ikuhisa Minowa, Vítor Ribeiro, Fernando Terere, Caol Uno, and Craig Jones.

They have also featured several former MMA world champions, like Strikeforce Middleweight Champion Jake Shields, Bellator MMA welterweight world champion Rafael Lovato Jr., and UFC Lightweight Champion and WEC Lightweight Champion Benson Henderson. Former UFC Welterweight competitor Dan Hardy and UFC referee Marc Goddard have served as event judges, while Hardy and regular Polaris competitor Dan Strauss have often served as commentators. The promotion streams all of their events live on UFC Fight Pass, other than smaller 'Contenders' tournaments where athletes compete for a place on their numbered events.

== Current Polaris Title Holders ==
Division	Champion
Women Under 55 KG (121)	(Wales) Ffion Davies
Women Under 60 KG (132)	(Brazil) Michelle Nicolini
Women Under 66KG (145)	(United States) Elisabeth Clay
Women Openweight	(United States) Kendall Reusing
Bantamweight (135)	(Wales) Ashley Williams
Featherweight (145)	(United States) Keith Krikorian
Lightweight (155)	(Canada) Ethan Crelinsten
Welterweight (170)	(Poland) Mateusz Szczecinski
Middleweight (185)	(Ecuador) Roberto Jimenez
Light Heavyweight (205)	(Australia) Craig Jones
Heavyweight (265)	Vacant

== Events ==
=== 2015 in Polaris ===
==== Polaris 1 ====
Polaris 1
- Promotion: Polaris Pro Grappling
- Date: January 10, 2015
- Venue: Ice Arena Wales
- City: Cardiff, Wales

Polaris 1 was a grappling event held by Polaris Pro Grappling on January 10, 2015, at St David's Hall in Cardiff, Wales.

==== Results ====
Main Card
Weight class				Method	Round	Time	Notes
Absolute	(United States) Keenan Cornelius	def.	(United States) Dean Lister	Submission (reverse triangle)
77kg	(United States) Garry Tonon	def.	(Poland) Marcin Held	Submission (heel hook)
90kg	(Brazil) Pablo Popovitch	draw.	(Brazil) Eduardo Rios
82kg	(Brazil) Eduardo Telles	draw.	(United States) Mike Fowler
79kg	(United States) AJ Agazarm	def.	(United Kingdom) Oliver Geddes	Submission (triangle choke)
68kg	(Brazil) Michelle Nicolini	def.	(Brazil) Angelica Galvao	Submission (toe hold)
90kg	(Australia) Kit Dale	draw.	(Brazil) Victor Silverio
90kg	(Republic of Ireland) Darragh O'Conaill	draw.	(Brazil) Max Campos

==== Polaris 2 ====
Polaris 2
- Promotion: Polaris Pro Grappling
- Date: September 12, 2015
- Venue: Ice Arena Wales
- City: Cardiff, Wales

Polaris 2 was a grappling event held by Polaris Pro Grappling on September 12, 2015, at St David's Hall in Cardiff, Wales.

===== Results =====
Main Card
Weight class				Method	Round	Time	Notes
68kg	(United States) Garry Tonon	def.	(Japan) Masakazu Imanari	Submission (heel hook)
55kg	(Brazil) Gezary Matuda	def.	(Brazil) Michelle Nicolini	Submission (armbar)
90kg	(United States) AJ Agazarm	draw.	(United Kingdom) Daniel Strauss
70kg	(United States) Eddie Cummings	def.	(United States) Reilly Bodycomb	Inside Heelhook
68kg	(United States) Gianni Grippo	def.	(United Kingdom) Tom Barlow	Submission (heel hook)
75kg	(Brazil) Vítor Ribeiro	def.	(Japan) Nakamura Daisuke	Submission (choke)
70kg	(Brazil) Robson Moura	draw.	(United States) Baret Yoshida
82kg	(Italy) Luca Anacoreta	def.	(Brazil) Pedro Bessa	Submission (triangle choke)

=== 2016 in Polaris ===
==== Polaris 3 ====
Polaris 3
- Promotion: Polaris Pro Grappling
- Date: April 2, 2016
- Venue: Lighthouse
- City: Poole, England

Polaris 3 was a grappling event held by Polaris Pro Grappling on April 2, 2016, at the Lighthouse in Poole, England.

===== Results =====
Main Card
Weight class				Method	Round	Time	Notes
83kg	(United States) Garry Tonon	draw.	(Brazil) Rousimar Palhares
80.5kg	(United States) AJ Agazarm	draw.	(United States) Jake Shields
70kg	(United States) Eddie Cummings	draw.	(Brazil) Augusto Mendes
68kg	(Brazil) Bruno Frazatto	draw.	(United States) Gianni Grippo
53.5kg	(Brazil) Gezary Matuda	draw.	(France) Laurence Cousin
81kg	(United States) Jonathon Satava	draw.	(Republic of Ireland) Darragh O'Conaill
68kg	(United States) Geo Martinez	draw.	(Brazil) Luiz Tosta
64kg	(Brazil) Joao Miyao	draw.	(Japan) Yukinori Sasa

==== Polaris 4 ====
Polaris 4
- Promotion: Polaris Pro Grappling
- Date: October 29, 2016
- Venue: Lighthouse
- City: Poole, England

Polaris 4 was a grappling event held by Polaris Pro Grappling on October 29, 2016, at the Lighthouse in Poole, England.

===== Results =====
Polaris 4
Weight Class				Method	Round	Time	Notes
Catchweight 82 kg	(Brazil) Fernando Terere	def.	(Brazil) Vítor Ribeiro	Decision (Unanimous)	1	15:00	GI
Catchweight 77 kg	(United States) Garry Tonon	def.	(Brazil) Gilbert Burns	Submission (Heel Hook)	1	9:26	NO-GI
Catchweight 80 kg	(United States) AJ Agazarm	def.	(Japan) Ikuhisa Minowa	Submission (Triangle Choke)	1	5:11	NO-GI
Catchweight 90 kg	(United States) Dillon Danis	def.	(Brazil) Jackson Sousa	Submission (Heel Hook)	1	8:32	NO-GI
Catchweight 68 kg	(United States) Nathan Orchard	def.	(Japan) Masakazu Imanari	Submission (Rear-Naked Choke)	1	5:51	NO-GI
Catchweight 84 kg	(Brazil) Charles Negromonte	def.	(Brazil) Eduardo Rios	Decision (Unanimous)	1	15:00	NO-GI
Women Absolute	(Lithuania) Dominyka Obelenyte	def.	(England) Yasmine Wilson	Decision (Unanimous)	1	15:00	GI
Absolute	(England) Tom Breese	def.	(England) Ben Dyson	Decision (Unanimous)	1	15:00	NO-GI

=== 2017 in Polaris ===
==== Polaris 5 ====
Polaris 5
- Promotion: Polaris Pro Grappling
- Date: August 19, 2017
- Venue: Indigo at The O2
- City: London, England

Polaris 5 was a grappling event held by Polaris Pro Grappling on August 19, 2017, at the Indigo at The O2 in London, England.

===== Results =====
Polaris 5
Weight Class				Method	Round	Time	Notes
Catchweight 78 kg	(United States) Garry Tonon	def.	(United States) Dillon Danis	Decision (Unanimous)	1	15:00	NO-GI
Catchweight 90 kg	(United States) Jake Shields	def.	(England) Daniel Strauss	Decision (Majority)	1	15:00	NO-GI
Catchweight 66 kg	(England) Phil Harris	def.	(England) Brad Pickett	Decision (Split)	1	15:00	NO-GI
Catchweight 72.7 kg	(Brazil) Vítor Ribeiro	def.	(Japan) Caol Uno	Submission (Rear-Naked Choke)	1	7:26	NO-GI
Catchweight 78 kg	(United States) AJ Agazarm	def.	(England) Lloyd Cooper	Submission (Bow & Arrow Choke)	1	6:00	GI
Catchweight 76 kg	(Canada) Oliver Taza	def.	(England) Ross Nicholls	Decision (Unanimous)	1	15:00	NO-GI
Catchweight 64 kg	(England) Samantha Cook	def.	(England) Vanessa English	Decision (Unanimous)	1	15:00	GI
Catchweight 83 kg	(England) Bradley Hill	def.	(Finland) Tommi Pulkkanen	Decision (Split)	1	15:00	NO-GI

=== 2018 in Polaris ===
==== Polaris 6 ====
Polaris 6
- Promotion: Polaris Pro Grappling
- Date: February 17, 2018
- Venue: Indigo at The O2
- City: London, England

Polaris 6 was a grappling event held by Polaris Pro Grappling on February 17, 2018, at the Indigo at The O2 in London, England.

===== Results =====
Polaris 6
Weight Class					Method	Round	Time	Notes
Middleweight 83.9 kg	NO-GI	(Australia) Craig Jones	def.	(United States) Jake Shields	Submission (Heel Hook)	1	1:04	For inaugural the Polaris Middleweight Championship
Catchweight 80 kg	NO-GI	(United States) Benson Henderson	def.	(United States) AJ Agazarm	Decision (Unanimous)	1	15:00	
Women Under 55 kg	NO-GI	(Brazil) Gezary Matuda	def.	(Italy) Serena Gabrielli	Submission (Ankle Lock)	1	2:43	
Welterweight 77.1 kg	NO-GI	(Poland) Marcin Held	def.	(England) Chris Fishgold	Submission (Armbar)	1	1:38	
Catchweight 72 kg	NO-GI	(Brazil) Marco Cahna	def.	(England) Ash Grimshaw	Decision (Unanimous)	1	15:00	
Women Under 55 kg	NO-GI	(Wales) Ffion Davies	def.	(United States) Chelsea Leah	Submission (Armbar)	1	5:45	

==== Polaris 7 ====
Polaris 7
- Promotion: Polaris Pro Grappling
- Date: July 14, 2018
- Venue: Indigo at The O2
- City: London, England

Polaris 7 was a grappling event held by Polaris Pro Grappling on July 14, 2018, at the Indigo at The O2 in London, England.

===== Results =====
Polaris 7
Weight Class					Method	Round	Time	Notes
Catchweight 85 kg	NO-GI	(Brazil) Gilbert Burns	def.	(Brazil) Gregor Gracie	Injury (Shoulder)	1	13:12	
Welterweight 77.1 kg	NO-GI	(Canada) Oliver Taza	def.	(Australia) Lachlan Giles	Decision (Unanimous)	1	15:00	
Featherweight 65.8 kg	NO-GI	(United States) Nicky Ryan	def.	(England) Phil Harris	Submission (Armbar)	1	6:48	
Featherweight 65.8 kg	NO-GI	(Wales) Ashley Williams	def.	(Japan) Masakazu Imanari	Decision (Split)	1	15:00	
Welterweight 77.1 kg	NO-GI	(England) Ross Nicholls	def.	(United States) Nathan Orchard	Decision (Unanimous)	1	15:00	
Women Over 55 kg	NO-GI	(Finland) Venla Luukkonen	def.	(England) Samantha Cook	Decision (Split)	1	15:00	

==== Polaris 8 ====
Polaris 8
- Promotion: Polaris Pro Grappling
- Date: December 9, 2018
- Venue: Ice Arena Wales
- City: Cardiff, Wales

Polaris 8 was a grappling event held by Polaris Pro Grappling on December 9, 2018, at the Ice Arena Wales in Cardiff, Wales.

===== Background =====
The event was the third the Polaris has hosted at the Ice Arena Wales in Cardiff, Wales and the first since Polaris 2.

This event featured three world title fights. The card was headlined by the current Polaris middleweight Champion Craig Jones and the former IBJJF champion Keenan Cornelius in a match to crown the inaugural Polaris Light Heavyweight Champion. It was a rematch from their fight at ADCC 2017, which Cornelius had won.

===== Results =====
Polaris 8
Weight Class					Method	Round	Time	Notes
Light Heavyweight 93 kg	NO-GI	(Australia) Craig Jones	def.	(United States) Keenan Cornelius	Decision (Split)	1	15:00	For the inaugural Polaris Light Heavyweight Championship
Welterweight 77.1 kg	NO-GI	(Brazil) Vagner Rocha	def.	(United States) Benson Henderson	Submission (Rear-Naked Choke)	1	14:30	
Welterweight 77.1 kg	NO-GI	(United States) Mansher Khera	def.	(Australia) Lachlan Giles	Decision (Unanimous)	1	15:00	For the inaugural Polaris Welterweight Championship
Absolute	NO-GI	(England) Dan Strauss	def.	(Japan) Satoshi Ishii	Decision (Split)	1	15:00	
Featherweight 65.8 kg	NO-GI	(United States) Nicky Ryan	def.	(Japan) Masakazu Imanari	Submission (Rear-Naked Choke)	1	13:11	For the inaugural Polaris Featherweight Championship
Catchweight 80 kg	GI	(Finland) Santeri Lilius	def.	(Brazil) Pedro Bessa	Decision (Unanimous)	1	15:00	

=== 2019 in Polaris ===
==== Polaris 9 ====
Polaris 9
- Promotion: Polaris Pro Grappling
- Date: March 15, 2019
- Venue: Indigo at The O2
- City: London, England

Polaris 9 was a grappling event held by Polaris Pro Grappling on March 15, 2019, at the Indigo at The O2 in London, England.

===== Background =====
The event was the fourth the Polaris has hosted at the Indigo at The O2 in London, England. The card was headlined by a catchweight superfight between the multiple-time MMA champion Jake Shields and future Bellator MMA Middleweight Champion and grappling champion Rafael Lovato Jr.

In the co-featured slot, for inaugural the Polaris Women Under 55KG Championship a bout between IBJJF(2018) champion Ffion Davies and IBJJF(2013/2014/2016) champion Gezary Matuda took place.

===== Bonus awards =====
The following fighters were awarded bonuses:

- Performance of the Night: Ffion Davies
- Submission of the Night: Ethan Crelinsten

===== Results =====
Polaris 9
Weight Class					Method	Round	Time	Notes
Catchweight 90.7 kg	NO-GI	(United States) Rafael Lovato Jr.	def.	(United States) Jake Shields	Decision (Unanimous)	1	15:00	
Women Under 55 kg	NO-GI	(Wales) Ffion Davies	def.	(Brazil) Gezary Matuda	Submission (Arm-Triangle Choke)	1	2:26	For the inaugural Polaris Women Under 55 KG Championship
Welterweight 77.1 kg	NO-GI	(Brazil) Vagner Rocha	def.	(England) Ross Nicholls	Decision (Split)	1	15:00	
Lightweight 70.3 kg	NO-GI	(Canada) Ethan Crelinsten	def.	(Republic of Ireland) Tom Halpin	Submission (Armbar)	1	8:48	
Middleweight 83.9 kg	NO-GI	(United States) Mike Perez	def.	(Republic of Ireland) Darragh O'Conaill	Decision (Unanimous)	1	15:00	
Middleweight 83.9 kg	GI	(Brazil) Eduardo Rios	def.	(Finland) Santeri Lilius	Decision (Split)	1	15:00	

==== Polaris 10 ====
Polaris 10
- Promotion: Polaris Pro Grappling
- Date: May 25, 2019
- Venue: Lighthouse
- City: Poole, England

Polaris 10 was a grappling event held by Polaris Pro Grappling on May 25, 2019, at the Lighthouse in Poole, England.

===== Background =====
Brad Pickett was scheduled to face Caol Uno at Polaris 10, but Pickett was forced off the card on March 12 with an injury. Leigh Remedios has stepped in on short notice to face Uno.

===== Results =====
Polaris 10
Weight Class					Method	Round	Time	Notes
Featherweight 65.8 kg	NO-GI	(United States) Nicky Ryan (c)	def.	(United States) Urijah Faber	Decision (Unanimous)	1	15:00	For the Polaris Featherweight Championship
Middleweight 83.9 kg	NO-GI	(Australia) Craig Jones (c)	def.	(Brazil) Matheus Lutes	Decision (Unanimous)	1	15:00	For the Polaris Middleweight Championship
Lightweight 70.3 kg	NO-GI	(Wales) Ashley Williams	def.	(Canada) Ethan Crelinsten	Decision (Unanimous)	1	15:00	For the inaugural Polaris Lightweight Championship
Lightweight 70.3 kg	NO-GI	(Japan) Caol Uno	def.	(England) Leigh Remedios	Submission (Keylock)	1	5:10	
Middleweight 83.9 kg	NO-GI	(United States) Richie Martinez	def.	(Slovenia) Miha Perhavec	Submission (Rear-Naked Choke)	1	0:53	
Catchweight 105 kg	NO-GI	(United States) Nick Rodriguez	def.	(Wales) Ashley Amos	Submission (Rear-Naked Choke)	1	7:30	

==== Polaris 11 ====
Polaris 11
- Promotion: Polaris Pro Grappling
- Date: August 31, 2019
- Venue: Bridgewater Hall
- City: Manchester, England

Polaris 11 was a grappling event held by Polaris Pro Grappling on August 31, 2019, at the Bridgewater Hall in Manchester, England.

===== Background =====
Vagner Rocha has had to pull out of his title fight against Mansher Khera. However, Edwin Najmi stepping up on short notice to face Khera.

Marc Diakiese has had to pull out of his match with Chris Fishgold, however, Diakiese's training partner and grappling instructor, Liam Cann, will be stepping in on short notice to test himself against the powerful UFC grappler.

Unfortunately due to a last minute training injury, Satoshi Ishii is unable to compete and so the match with Arya Esfandmaz will have to be postponed.

===== Results =====
Polaris 11
Weight Class					Method	Round	Time	Notes
Women Under 55 kg	NO-GI	(Wales) Ffion Davies (c)	def.	(Brazil) Talita Alencar	Decision (Unanimous)	1	15:00	For the Polaris Women Under 55 KG Championship
Welterweight 77.1 kg	NO-GI	(United States) Edwin Najmi	def.	(United States) Mansher Khera (c)	Decision (Unanimous)	1	15:00	For the Polaris Welterweight Championship
Welterweight 77.1 kg	NO-GI	(Scotland) Stevie Ray	def.	(England) Paddy Pimblett	Submission (Heelhook)	1	7:42	
Middleweight 83.9 kg	GI	(Norway) Tommy Langaker	def.	(Brazil) Marcos Tinoco	Decision (Split)	1	15:00	
Catchweight 103 kg	NO-GI	(United States) Nick Rodriguez	def.	(England) Ben Dyson	Decision (Unanimous)	1	15:00	
Catchweight 74 kg	NO-GI	(England) Liam Cann	def.	(England) Chris Fishgold	Decision (Unanimous)	1	15:00	

==== Polaris 12 ====
Polaris 12
- Promotion: Polaris Pro Grappling
- Date: November 30, 2019
- Venue: International Convention Centre Wales
- City: Newport, Wales

Polaris 12 was a grappling event held by Polaris Pro Grappling on November 30, 2019, at the International Convention Centre Wales in Newport, Wales.

===== Background =====
João Miyao has been forced to withdraw from his scheduled Polaris Bantamweight Championship bout against Ashley Williams due to an injury, Azize Hlali has stepped in as a replacement. Unfortunately, Hlali has been unable to compete. Williams instead faced Richard Alarcon, who stepped in on a weeks notice for this encounter.

===== Fight Card =====
Polaris 12
Weight Class					Method	Round	Time	Notes
Catchweight 104.3 kg	NO-GI	(United States) Nick Rodriguez	def.	(United States) Luke Rockhold	Decision (Unanimous)	1	15:00	
Bantamweight 61 kg	NO-GI	(Wales) Ashley Williams	def.	(United States) Richard Alarcon	Submission (Armbar)	1	1:39	For the inaugural Polaris Bantamweight Championship
Catchweight 80 kg	GI	(Norway) Tommy Langaker	def.	(Brazil) Gilbert Burns	Decision (Unanimous)	1	15:00	
W.Catchweight 57 kg	NO-GI	(Brazil) Michelle Nicolini	def.	(England) Vanessa English	Submission (Toe Hold)	1		
Catchweight 104 kg	NO-GI	(United States) Devhonte Johnson	def.	(England) Arya Esfandmaz	Decision (Unanimous)	1	15:00	
Welterweight 77 kg	NO-GI	(United States) PJ Barch	def.	(Poland) Marcin Held	Decision (Unanimous)	1	15:00	

=== 2020 in Polaris ===
==== Polaris 13: UK Grand Prix ====
Polaris 13: UK Grand Prix
- Promotion: Polaris Pro Grappling
- Date: April 4, 2020
- Venue: International Convention Centre Wales
- City: Newport, Wales

Polaris 13: UK Grand Prix was a grappling event held by Polaris Pro Grappling on July 11, 2020, at the International Convention Centre Wales in Newport, Wales.

===== Background =====
Differing from the previous Polaris events, the event was a one-night tournament with all eight competitors weighing in at under 90 kg.

===== Fight Card =====
Polaris 13
Weight Class					Method	Round	Time	Notes
Absolute Superfight	NO-GI	(England) Jed Hue	def.	(Romania) Dinu Bucalet	Kimura			
Opening Round	NO-GI	(England) Taylor Pearman	def.	(Romania) Nastasa Silviu Georgian	Judge's Decision			
Opening Round	NO-GI	(Germany) Frederic Vosgrone	def.	(England) Tom Breese	Points			
Opening Round	NO-GI	(England) Ross Nicholls	def.	(England) Dominic Dillon	Points			
Opening Round	NO-GI	(England) Bradley Hill	def.	(England) Shane Curtis	Rear-Naked Choke			
Semi-Final Round	NO-GI	(Germany) Frederic Vosgrone	def.	(England) Taylor Pearman	Points			
Semi-Final Round	NO-GI	(England) Ross Nicholls	def.	(England) Bradley Hill	Judge's Decision			
Final Match	NO-GI	(Germany) Frederic Vosgrone	def.	(England) Ross Nicholls	Points			

==== Polaris 14: Squads ====
===== Background =====
Polaris 14: Squads was the first event of the promotion's new format that featured two teams of eight grapplers, four under 75 kg and four under 95 kg on each team. They competed across an eighty-minute time period, split into two halves. The first event of its kind to use this unique ruleset, it saw UFC veterans and elite BJJ black belts representing Team UK and Ireland, and Team Europe. The event also featured a non-title superfight between Ffion Davies and Magdalena Loska.

===== Team UK and Ireland =====
====== -75kg ======
Ashley Williams

Tom Halpin

Dominic Dillon

Jed Hue

====== -95kg ======
Darragh O'Connail

Bradley Hill

Kieran Davern

Taylor Pearman

===== Team Europe =====
====== -75kg ======
Mateusz Szczeciński

Tommi Pulkkanen

Kamil Wilk

Dinu Bucalet

====== -95kg ======
Eduardo 'Teta' Rios

Marcin Held

Tarik Hopstock

Santeri Lilius

===== Results =====
After a total of seventeen matches, Team UK & Ireland won the event 1–0. Fifteen of the matches ended in a draw and double-elimination, with the only submission coming from Tom Halpin. He submitted Dinu Bucalet via Triangle Choke late in the first half. The main event superfight saw Ffion Davies defeat Magdalena Loska via Rear-Naked Choke.

==== Polaris 15: Squads 2 ====
===== Background =====
Polaris 15: Squads 2 changed the format slightly from their first Squads event, with this edition being contested in the gi instead and the presence of Team UK instead of the addition of Ireland. Team Europe remained unchanged, although the lineup for both teams was drastically different from the first event, owing to the switch from no gi to gi. The superfight for this event featured a contest for the promotion's vacant Featherweight Championship between former Squads teammates, Ashley Williams and Tom Halpin.

===== Team UK =====
====== -75kg ======
Bryn Jenkins

Adam Adshead

Tyrone Elliott

Sam Gibson

====== -95kg ======
Arya Esfandmaz

Bradley Hill

Jamie Paxman

Marcos Nardini

===== Team Europe =====
====== -75kg ======
Espen Mathiesen

Tommi Pulkkanen

Leon Larman

Dinu Bucalet

====== -95kg ======
Adam Wardzinski

Tommy Langaker

Luca Anacoreta

Max Lindblad

===== Results =====
After a total of twenty-two matches, Team Europe won the event 9–0. Eight of the matches ended in a finish, with the remaining fourteen being declared a draw and Team Europe being awarded a bonus point as Bryn Jenkins was forced to withdraw after half-time due to an injury. Tommy Langaker submitted Bryn Jenkins via Armbar, Marcos Nardini via Triangle Choke, and Sam Gibson via Cross-Collar Choke. Leon Larman submitted Tyrone Elliott via Bow and Arrow Choke, and both Adam Adshead and Sam Gibson via Collar Choke. Dinu Bucalet submitted Tyrone Elliott via Ezekiel Choke and Luca Anacoreta submitted Jamie Paxman via Reverse Triangle Choke. The superfight between Ashley Williams and Tom Halpin went the full fifteen minutes before Williams was declared the victor by decision, making him the first three-weight champion in Polaris history.

=== 2021 in Polaris ===
==== Polaris 16: Squads 3 ====
===== Background =====
Polaris 16: Squads 3 was an event that took place on August 7, 2021. This event saw a return to the competition being contested without the use of a gi, and will also be the first time that Team USA will appear, competing against Team UK & Ireland. Darragh O'Connail returned to serve as captain for Team UK & Ireland, while Geo and Richie Martinez took up positions as Co-Captains for Team USA. This event was also the first of the Polaris Squads events to feature preliminary matches as well as a superfight for the promotion's Heavyweight title, with the running order as follows:

===== Preliminary Matches =====
Jack Sear v Ciaran Brohan

Walli Abdullah v Ollie Bates

Libby Genge v Bryony Tyrell

Charlie Baker v Mason Guard

===== Superfight =====
Nastasa Silviu Georgian v Kyle Boehm

===== Team UK and Ireland =====
====== -75kg ======
Jed Hue

Ellis Younger

Ross Nicholls

Darragh O'Connaill

====== -95kg ======
Dan Strauss

Bradley Hill

Kieran Davern

Ben Dyson

===== Team USA =====
====== -75kg ======
Geo Martinez

Adam Benayoun

Nathan Orchard

Nick Ronan

====== -95kg ======
Roberto Jimenez

Jon 'Thor' Blank

Richie 'Boogieman' Martinez

Hunter Colvin

===== Results =====
After a total of twenty-seven matches, Team USA won the event 7–0. Three of the matches ended in a finish, with the remaining twenty-four being declared a draw. Nathan Orchard earned three points by submitting Kieran Davern with a modified twister, Roberto Jimenez earned a point by submitting Bradley Hill with a rear-naked choke, and Geo Martinez earned three points when Dan Strauss was injured during their match and could not continue. The superfight ended with Kyle Boehm submitting Nastasa Silviu Georgian with a belly-down heelhook in less than a minute to become the Polaris Heavyweight Champion.

==== Polaris 17 ====
===== Background =====
For the first time since Polaris 12, the promotion returned to the superfight format with the event held October 9, 2021 in the Central Hall, Southampton, UK. Craig Jones defended his Polaris Middleweight title and Kendall Reusing capturing the Women's inaugural Polaris Openweight title.

===== Fight Card =====
Polaris 17
Weight Class					Method	Time	Notes
Middleweight (83.9 kg)	NO-GI	(Australia) Craig Jones	def.	(Brazil) Davi Ramos	Judges Decision	10:00	For the Polaris Middleweight title
Women Openweight (+55 kg)	NO-GI	(United States) Kendall Reusing	def.	(Finland) Venla Luukkonen	Submission (Armbar)	4:28	For the inaugural Polaris Openweight title
Catchweight (80 kg)	NO-GI	(England) Jed Hue	def.	(United States) Kody Steele	Judges Decision	10:00	
Lightweight (77 kg)	NO-GI	(Poland) Mateusz Szczecinski	def.	(England) Ellis Younger	Submission (Ankle Lock)	3:22	
Middleweight (85 kg)	NO-GI	(Norway) Tarik Hopstock	def.	(England) Fred Greenall	Judges Decision	10:00	
Catchweight (70 kg)	NO-GI	(Poland) Kamil Wilk	def.	(United States) Robert Degle	Judges Decision	10:00	

==== Polaris 18 ====
Polaris 18
- Promotion: Polaris Pro Grappling
- Date: November 27th, 2021
- Venue: International Convention Centre Wales
- City: Newport, Wales

===== Background =====
Polaris 18 took place at ICC Wales on 27 November 2021.

===== Fight Card =====
Polaris 18
Weight Class					Method	Time	Notes
Featherweight (66 kg)	GI	(Wales) Ashley Williams	def.	(Brazil) Paulo Miyao	Judge's Decision	10:00	
Welterweight (77.1 kg)	NO-GI	(England) Jed Hue	def.	(United States) AJ Agazarm	Judge's Decision	10:00	
Light-Heavyweight (90 kg)	GI	(Brazil) Igor Tanabe	def.	(Norway) Tommy Langaker	Bow & Arrow Choke		
Welterweight (77 kg)	NO-GI	(Scotland) Steven Ray	def.	(Wales) Craig Ewers	Twister		
Welterweight (77 kg)	GI	(France) Leon Larman	def.	(Wales) Bryn Jenkins	Judge's Decision	10:00	
Middleweight (84 kg)	NO-GI	(England) Lloyd Cooper	def.	(Wales) Tom Barry	Split Decision	10:00	

=== 2022 in Polaris ===
==== Polaris 19 ====
Polaris 19
- Promotion: Polaris Pro Grappling
- Date: March 26th, 2022
- Venue: Southampton Central Hall
- City: Southampton, England

===== Background =====
Polaris 19 is a professional grappling event that took take place on 26 March 2022, in Southampton, England.

===== Fight Card =====
Results

Polaris 19
Weight Class					Method	Time	Notes
	NO-GI	(United States) Roberto Jimenez	def.	(United States) Magid Hage	Submission (Rear-Naked Choke)	3:13	
Lightweight	NO-GI	(Wales) Ashley Williams	def.	(England) Jack Sear	Unanimous Decision		
Openweight	NO-GI	(United States) Kendall Reusing	def.	(United States) Amanda Leve	Forfeit due to Injury	5:05	for the inaugural Women's Openweight title
	NO-GI	(England) Owen Livesey	def.	(Germany) Frederic Vosgrone	Unanimous Decision		
	NO-GI	(Republic of Ireland) Eoghan O'Flanagan	def.	(France) Valentin Fels	Unanimous Decision		
	NO-GI	(Italy) Margot Ciccarelli	def.	(Wales) Ashley Bendle	Unanimous Decision		

==== Polaris 20: Squads 4 ====
Polaris 20
- Promotion: Polaris Pro Grappling
- Date: June 25th, 2022
- Venue: International Convention Centre Wales
- City: Newport, Wales

===== Background =====
Polaris 20: Squads 4 is a professional grappling event that took take place on 25 June 2022, in Newport, Wales. This was the fourth edition of the Squads format that featured Team USA defending their status as champions against Team Brazil.

===== Superfight =====
Demian Maia v Benson Henderson

===== Team USA =====
====== -75kg ======
Geo Martinez

Keith Krikorian

Nathan Orchard

Nick Ronan

====== -95kg ======
Mason Fowler

Richie 'Boogieman' Martinez

Jon 'Thor' Blank

Hunter Colvin

===== Team Brazil =====
====== -75kg ======
Luiz Paulo

Fabricio Andrey

Marcelo Fausto

Diogo Reis

====== -95kg ======
Kywan Gracie

Igor Tanabe

Isaque Bahiense

Mica Galvao

===== Results =====
After a total of twenty-six matches, Team Brazil won the event 2-1. Three of the matches ended in a finish, with the remaining twenty-three being declared a draw. Mason Fowler submitted Kywan Gracie with an armbar to register the first point of the match, and the only point for Team USA. Mica Galvao then submitted Keith Krikorian with an armbar in order to bring the score to 1-1, before he submitted Krikorian once again with a triangle choke in order to take the score to 2-1. The superfight ended with Demian Maia defeating Benson Henderson by Decision.

==== Polaris 21: Grapple Island ====
Polaris 21
- Promotion: Polaris Pro Grappling
- Date: September 24, 2022
- Venue: BJJ Summer Week
- City: (Italy) Cagliari, Sardinia

===== Background =====
Polaris 21: Grapple Island was a grappling event held by Polaris Pro Grappling on September 24, 2022, at the end of the BJJ Summer Week in Cagliari, Sardinia. This marked the very first time that the promotion held an event outside of the UK.

===== Results =====
Polaris 21
Weight Class					Method	Time	Notes
	NO-GI	(England) Jed Hue	def.	(Scotland) Paul Craig	Submission (Straight Ankle-Lock)	0:21	
Bantamweight	NO-GI	(Brazil) Michelle Nicolini	def.	(Wales) Ashley Bendle	Split Decision	15:00	For the inaugural Polaris Bantamweight title
	NO-GI	(England) Owen Livesey	def.	(United States) Josh Hinger	Split Decision	10:00	
	GI	(Brazil) Robson Moura	def.	(England) Tom Barlow	Unanimous Decision	10:00	
	NO-GI	(Republic of Ireland) Tom Halpin	def.	(Italy) Alessio Sachetti	Unanimous Decision	10:00	
	GI	(Norway) Espen Mathiesen	def.	(Italy) Luca Anacoreta	Submission (Bow & Arrow Choke)	1:52	
	NO-GI	(Italy) Alberto Buriasco	def.	(England) Shane Curtis	Unanimous Decision	10:00	

==== Polaris 22: Middleweight Grand Prix ====
Polaris 22
- Promotion: Polaris Pro Grappling
- Date: November 5, 2022
- Venue: Southampton Central Hall
- City: Southampton, England

===== Background =====
Polaris 22: Middleweight Grand Prix was a grappling event held by Polaris Pro Grappling on November 5, 2022. The event featured several superfights along with a middleweight grand prix that saw the winner crowned the new Middleweight world champion. Oliver Taza, Jed Hue, Mateusz Szczecinski, Roberto Jimenez, Hunter Colvin, Alan Sanchez, Owen Livesey, and Shane Fishman all competed in the tournament.

===== Fight Card =====
Polaris 22
Weight Class					Method	Time	Notes
Opening Round	NO-GI	(United States) Hunter Colvin	def.	(England) Owen Livesey	Rear-Naked Choke	9:27	
Opening Round	NO-GI	(Ecuador) Roberto Jimenez	def.	(England) Shane Fishman	Points (9-2)	10:00	
Opening Round	NO-GI	(England) Jed Hue	def.	(United States) Alan Sanchez	Points (4-0)	10:00	
Opening Round	NO-GI	(Canada) Oliver Taza	def.	(Poland) Mateusz Szczecinski	Unanimous Decision	10:00	
Semifinal	NO-GI	(Ecuador) Roberto Jimenez	def.	(United States) Hunter Colvin	Triangle Choke	7:58	Awarded 'Match of the Year' at the Jitsmagazine 2022 BJJ Awards.
Semifinal	NO-GI	(England) Jed Hue	def.	(Canada) Oliver Taza	Points (1-0)	10:00	
Final	NO-GI	(Ecuador) Roberto Jimenez	def.	(England) Jed Hue	Arm-triangle Choke	9:55	for Polaris Middleweight world title
	NO-GI	(Wales) Ashley Williams	def.	(United States) Carlos Condit	Heelhook	4:14	
	GI	(Wales) Ben Robson	def.	(England) Claudio Brudny	Unanimous Decision	10:00	
	NO-GI	(England) Owen Jones	def.	(England) Anton Defreitas	Armbar	0:42	
	NO-GI	(England) John Hathaway	def.	(England) Matt Inman	Split Decision	10:00	
	NO-GI	(England) Violet Bennett	def.	(England) Emily Eyles	Armbar	4:23	
	NO-GI	(England) Jack Sear	def.	(England) Dani Khalid	Split Decision	10:00	
	GI	(England) Nathan Johnstone	def.	(England) Dominic Dillon	Toehold	1:29	
	NO-GI	(England) Finlay Nixon	def.	(England) Justin Moore	Heelhook	1:48	
	NO-GI	(England) Mo Coles	def.	(England) Gavin Stewart	Reverse Triangle Choke	7:14	

=== 2023 in Polaris ===
==== Polaris 23: Women's Under 66kg Grand Prix ====
Polaris 23
- Promotion: Polaris Pro Grappling
- Date: March 11, 2023
- Venue: Doncaster Dome
- City: Doncaster, England

===== Background =====
Polaris 23 was announced in December, 2022, when the promotion confirmed that the event would feature a grand prix tournament in the women's 66 kg division. The main event was announced as Owen Livesey v Chris Weidman, and the tournament was scheduled to feature Ffion Davies, Maggie Grindatti, Giovanna Jara, Amy Campo, Brianna Ste-Marie, Julia Maele, and Elisabeth Clay. Jara missed weight by 0.9 kg prior to the event and she was allowed to compete, although she was not eligible to win the title in the event that she won. Elisabeth Clay won the tournament and was crowned the under 66 kg champion.

===== Fight card =====
Polaris 22
Weight Class					Method	Time	Notes
	NO-GI	(England) Owen Livesey	def.	(United States) Chris Weidman	Unanimous Decision	15:00	
Opening Round	NO-GI	(Wales) Ffion Davies	def.	(Brazil) Giovana Jara	Points (4-1)	10:00	
Opening Round	NO-GI	(United States) Elisabeth Clay	def.	(Bulgaria) Joanna Dineva	Reverse Triangle Choke	8:57	
Opening Round	NO-GI	(United States) Amy Campo	def.	(Norway) Julia Maele	Rear-naked Choke	5:45	
Opening Round	NO-GI	(Canada) Brianna Ste-Marie	def.	(United States) Maggie Grindatti	Armbar	5:29	
Semifinal	NO-GI	(United States) Elisabeth Clay	def.	(Wales) Ffion Davies	Toehold	2:59	
Semifinal	NO-GI	(United States) Amy Campo	def.	(Canada) Brianna Ste-Marie	Rear-naked Choke	9:52	
Final	NO-GI	(United States) Elisabeth Clay	def.	(United States) Amy Campo	Points (1-0)	10:00	for Polaris Under 66 kg world title

==== Polaris 24 ====
Polaris 24
- Promotion: Polaris Pro Grappling
- Date: June 3, 2023
- Venue: Fairfield Halls
- City: Croydon

===== Background =====
Polaris 24 was a professional grappling event held by Polaris Pro Grappling on June 3, 2023. It was first announced in January 2023 and the promotion confirmed that a men's under 70 kg tournament would take place at the event. During the live broadcast of Polaris 23 the main event was revealed to be a lightweight title-fight between Ryan Hall and the reigning champion Ashley Williams. Both men withdrew from the event and the title was vacated, with Ethan Crelinsten and Nathan Orchard competing for the vacant belt in the co-main event instead. Jed Hue and Mateusz Szczecinski were also booked to compete for the vacant welterweight title in the main event. The men's tournament was postponed and there were a number of superfights booked for Polaris 24 instead.

===== Results =====
Polaris 24
Weight Class					Method	Time	Notes
Welterweight	NO-GI	(Poland) Mateusz Szczecinski	def.	(England) Jed Hue	Submission (Straight Ankle-Lock)	0:21	For the vacant Polaris Welterweight title
Lightweight	NO-GI	(Canada) Ethan Crelinsten	def.	(United States) Nathan Orchard	Unanimous Decision	15:00	For the vacant Polaris Lightweight title
	NO-GI	(England) Dinu Bucalet	def.	(England) Ollie Webb	Split Decision	10:00	
	NO-GI	(Italy) Martina Zola	def.	(England) Rosie Clarke	Unanimous Decision	10:00	
	NO-GI	(England) Eoghan O'Flanagan	def.	(United States) Hunter Colvin	Unanimous Decision	10:00	
	No-GI	(United States) Jason Rau	def.	(England) Matty Holmes	Submission (Armbar)		
	NO-GI	(United States) Keith Krikorian	def.	(Republic of Ireland) Tom Halpin	Submission (Rear-naked Choke)		

==== Polaris 25: Absolute Grand Prix ====
Polaris 25
- Promotion: Polaris Pro Grappling
- Date: September 30, 2023
- Venue: TBC
- City: Ebbw Vale

===== Background =====
Polaris announced that an absolute grand prix had been scheduled for their 25th event, with 8 men competing for a $30,000 grand prize. The promotion also scheduled a Contenders tournament on August 26, 2023 to determine the final entrant into the tournament. Marcin Maciulewicz won that tournament and became the final entrant.

Aljamain Sterling was originally booked to compete against Nathaniel Wood in the main event superfight. Wood withdrew from the match and was replaced by Mike Grundy instead.

===== Fight Card =====
Polaris 25
Weight Class					Method	Time	Notes
Main event	NO-GI	(United States) Aljamain Sterling	def.	(England) Mike Grundy	Decision		
Final	NO-GI	(Brazil) Kaynan Duarte	def.	(Brazil) Fabricio Andrey	Rear-naked Choke	Duarte wins the absolute grand prix	
Semi-final	NO-GI	(Brazil) Fabricio Andrey	def.	(United States) Giancarlo Bodoni	Points (1-0)	Won 'Match of the Year' at JitsMagazine BJJ Awards 2023	
Semi-final	NO-GI	(Brazil) Kaynan Duarte	def.	(Australia) Izaak Michell	Points (3-1)		
Opening Round	NO-GI	(Brazil) Fabricio Andrey	def.	(England) Owen Livesey	Points (1-0)		
Opening Round	NO-GI	(United States) Giancarlo Bodoni	def.	(Poland) Marcin Maciulewicz	Rear-naked Choke		
Opening Round	NO-GI	(Australia) Izaak Michell	def.	(Ecuador) Roberto Jimenez	Points (2-0)		
Opening Round	NO-GI	(Brazil) Kaynan Duarte	def.	(United States) Jason Rau	Rear-naked Choke		

==== Polaris 26: Jones v Meerschaert ====
Polaris 26
- Promotion: Polaris Pro Grappling
- Date: November 5, 2023
- Venue: Southampton Central Hall
- City: Southampton

===== Background =====
Polaris announced that Craig Jones will be competing against UFC middleweight veteran Gerald Meerschaert in the main event. They later confirmed that Kendall Reusing will be making her return to professional grappling after over a year away due to injury, and she will be defending her openweight title against Leticia Cardozo. Molly McCann is also scheduled to make her professional grappling debut against Julia Scardone.

===== Fight Card =====
Polaris 25
Weight Class					Method	Time	Notes
Light-heavyweight	NO-GI	(Australia) Craig Jones	def.	(United States) Gerald Meerschaert	Rear-naked Choke		
Openweight	NO-GI	(United States) Kendall Reusing	def.	(Brazil) Leticia Cardozo	Decision	Reusing retains the women's openweight title	
	NO-GI	(England) Molly McCann	def.	(England) Julia Scardone	Armbar		
	NO-GI	(Norway) Tommy Langaker	def.	(Canada) Oliver Taza	Decision		
	NO-GI	(England) Owen Jones	def.	(Netherlands) Bart Dubbeldam	Decision		
	NO-GI	(Poland) Marcin Maciulewicz	def.	(England) Max Bickerton	Decision		
	GI	(Brazil) Luiz Finnochio	def.	(Ecuador) Nathan Johnstone	Decision		
	NO-GI	(England) Nia Blackman	def.	(Republic of Ireland) Amanda Pamela Nicole	Decision		
	NO-GI	(England) Phil Harris	def.	(England) Mark Phung	Decision		
	NO-GI	(England) Dominic Dillon	def.	(Poland) Claudio Brudny	Reverse Bulldog Choke		
	NO-GI	(England) Kerry Isom	def.	(England) Jade Barker	Decision		
	NO-GI	(England) Sam Crook	def.	(England) Mike Parry	Decision		
	NO-GI	(England) Justin Moore	def.	(England) Matthew Fitz-James	Arm-triangle Choke		
	NO-GI	(England) Jack Hassard	def.	(England) Abraham Dannan	Decision		
	NO-GI	(Cameroon) Franck Takadjou	def.	(England) Archer Colaco	Decision		

=== 2024 in Polaris ===
==== Polaris 27: Welterweight grand prix ====
Polaris 27
- Promotion: Polaris Pro Grappling
- Date: March 23, 2024
- Venue: International Convention Centre Wales
- City: Newport, Wales

===== Background =====
Polaris announced that Polaris 27 would feature a welterweight grand prix tournament with a grand prize of $20,000. Ashley Williams vacated the featherweight title so that Owen Jones and Gabriel Sousa could compete for it in the main event, although both men withdrew and were replaced by Keith Krikorian and Cameron Donnelly. Ffion Davies also defended her flyweight title against Brianna Ste-Marie, while UFC veterans Nathaniel Wood and Alex Caceres were booked to compete in a superfight.

===== Fight Card =====
Polaris 27
Weight Class					Method	Time	Notes
Main event	NO-GI	(Wales) Ffion Davies	def.	(Canada) Brianna Ste-Marie	Unanimous Decision		For the flyweight title
Final	NO-GI	(United States) PJ Barch	def.	(Australia) Levi Jones-Leary	Points (2-0)		Barch wins the welterweight grand prix
Semi-final	NO-GI	(Australia) Levi Jones-Leary	def.	(South Africa) Jozef Chen	Points (1-0)		
Semi-final	NO-GI	(United States) PJ Barch	def.	(Norway) Espen Mathiesen	Heel Hook		
Opening Round	NO-GI	(South Africa) Jozef Chen	def.	(United States) Harrison Woods	Kimura		
Opening Round	NO-GI	(Australia) Levi Jones-Leary	def.	(England) Shane Curtis	Rear-naked Choke		
Opening Round	NO-GI	(Norway) Espen Mathiesen	def.	(United States) Max Hanson	Unanimous Decision		
Opening Round	NO-GI	(United States) PJ Barch	def.	(Brazil) Luiz Paulo	Split Decision		
Featured Prelim	NO-GI	(England) Nathaniel Wood	def.	(United States) Alex Caceres	Rear-naked Choke		
Featured Prelim	NO-GI	(United States) Keith Krikorian	def.	(Scotland) Cameron Donnelly	Armbar		For the featherweight title

==== Polaris 28 ====
Polaris 28
- Promotion: Polaris Pro Grappling
- Date: June 15, 2024
- Venue: Doncaster Dome
- City: Doncaster, England

===== Background =====
Polaris 28 was originally supposed to be headlined by a superfight between Owen Livesey and Yoel Romero, but Romero had to withdraw from the match when his flight was cancelled. He was replaced by Baissangour ‘Baki’ Chamsoudinov and a new stipulation was added to the match to remove the possibility of a judge’s decision. It also included a pair of matches for vacant titles, as Helena Crevar faced Jessika Torttila for the women’s lightweight title and Mateusz Szczecinski faced Levi Jones-Leary for the men’s welterweight title.

===== Fight Card =====
Polaris 28
Weight Class					Method	Time	Notes
Openweight	NO-GI	(England) Owen Livesey	vs.	(Chechnya) Baissangour ‘Baki’ Chamsoudinov	Draw		
77kg	NO-GI	(Poland) Mateusz Szczecinski	def.	(Australia) Levi Jones-Leary	Split Decision		For the welterweight title
70kg	NO-GI	(United States) Helena Crevar	def.	(Spain) Jessika Torttila	Unanimous decision		For the lightweight title
	NO-GI	(Finland) Santeri Lilius	def.	(England) Ben Bennett	Unanimous decision		
	NO-GI	(England) Jed Hue	def.	(Scotland) Stevie Ray	Unanimous decision		
	NO-GI	(England) Ellis Younger	def.	(England) Sam Quinn	Rear-naked Choke		
	NO-GI	(Costa Rica) Julian Espinosa	def.	(England) Jack Sear	Unanimous decision		
	NO-GI	(Canada) Shane Fishman	def.	(England) Shane Curtis	Twister		
	NO-GI	(England) Fred Greenall	def.	(Scotland) Kevin McAloon	Toehold		
	NO-GI	(England) Lee Herbert	def.	(England) Chris White	Unanimous decision		
	NO-GI	(England) Jake Goldthorpe	def.	(England) Gary Priestly	Rear-naked Choke		
	NO-GI	(Palestine) Abraham Dannan	def.	(England) Jack Hampshaw	Unanimous decision		
	NO-GI	(England) Amy Derwanz	def.	(England) Robyn Lucas	Japanese Necktie		
	NO-GI	(England) Jack Hassard	def.	(Greece) Christian Ozbek	Unanimous decision		
	NO-GI	(England) Jamie Faulding	def.	(England) Sam Barker	Armbar		
	NO-GI	(England) Kieran O’Brien	def.	(England) Danny Ball	Triangle choke		
	NO-GI	(England) Jared Eaton	def.	(England) Craig Young	Unanimous decision		
	NO-GI	(England) Arren Gurnhill	def.	(England) Charles Reindorf	Unanimous decision		

==== Polaris 29 ====
Polaris 29
- Promotion: Polaris Pro Grappling
- Date: September 7, 2024
- Venue: Poole Lighthouse
- City: Poole, England

===== Background =====
Polaris 29 was the promotion’s first event in several years that was headlined by a gi match, as Ashley Williams competed against Diego ‘Pato’ Oliviera. It was also the first time in several events that there were no titles on the line in any matches.

===== Fight Card =====
Polaris 29
Weight Class					Method	Time	Notes
	GI	(Brazil) Diego ‘Pato’ Oliviera	def.	(Wales) Ashley Williams	Unanimous Decision		
	NO-GI	(Republic of Ireland) Mohammed Avtarhanov	def.	(United States) Jacob Rodriguez	Split Decision		
	GI	(Brazil) Tainan Dalpra	def.	(Norway) Tarik Hopstock	Kimura		
	GI	(United States) Cole Abate	def.	(Republic of Ireland) Sam McNally	Unanimous decision		
	NO-GI	(Norway) Davis Asare	def.	(England) George Pearse	Unanimous decision		
	NO-GI	(England) Jed Hue	def.	(Costa Rica) Julian Espinosa	Split Decision		
	NO-GI	(Scotland) Cameron Donnelly	def.	(England) Dominic Dillon	Heel hook		
	NO-GI	(England) Carson Coles	def.	(Poland) Claudio Brudny	Arm-triangle choke		
	NO-GI	(England) Yousuf Nabi	def.	(England) Andy Roberts	Ankle-lock		
	NO-GI	(England) Justin Moore	def.	(Estonia) Andy Manzolo	Split decision		
	NO-GI	(Brazil) Luiz Finnochio	def.	(England) Archer Colaco	Armbar		
	NO-GI	(England) Jordan Kirk	def.	(England) Mario Saeed	Unanimous decision		
	NO-GI	(United States) Taylor Hishaw	def.	(England) Jade Barker	Rear-naked choke		
	NO-GI	(England) Gavin Stewart	def.	(England) Henry Pike	Short choke		
	NO-GI	(England) Harry Fall	def.	(Republic of Ireland) Liam O’Brien	Rear naked-choke		
	NO-GI	(Cambodia) Franck Takoudjou	def.	(England) Jack Gover	Unanimous decision		
	NO-GI	(England) Peter Shamarkou	def.	(England) Matthew Korsak	Unanimous decision		

==== Polaris 30 ====
Polaris 30
- Promotion: Polaris Pro Grappling
- Date: November 2, 2024
- Venue: Fairfield Halls
- City: London, England

===== Background =====
Polaris 30 was headlined by a superfight between UFC veterans Carlos Condit and Michael Page. In the co-main event, Helena Crevar was set to defend her lightweight title for the first time against Nia Blackman, while reign featherweight champion Keith Krikorian moved up in weight to face Jed Hue.

===== Fight Card =====
Polaris 30
Weight Class					Method	Time	Notes
	NO-GI	(England) Michael Page	def.	(United States) Carlos Condit	Unanimous decision		
	NO-GI	(United States) Helena Crevar	def.	(England) Nia Blackman	Unanimous decision		For the lightweight title
	NO-GI	(United States) Keith Krikorian	def.	(England) Jed Hue	Unanimous decision		
	NO-GI	(England) Nathaniel Wood	def.	(England) Cameron Else	Unanimous decision		
	NO-GI	(Canada) Dante Leon	def.	(England) Ellis Younger	Unanimous decision		
	NO-GI	(England) Eoghan O’Flanagan	def.	(Switzerland) Phillippe Geyer	Unanimous Decision		
	NO-GI	(Canada) Kieran Kichuk	def.	(England) Carson Coles	Unanimous decision		
	NO-GI	(England) Sula-mae Loewenthal	def.	(Republic of Ireland) Rosa Walsh	Rear-naked choke		
	NO-GI	(Brazil) Marco Canha	def.	(England) Andy Roberts	Unanimous decision		
	NO-GI	(England) Matt Inman	def.	(England) Will Stone	Americana		
	NO-GI	(England) Will Nicholls	def.	(United States) Ian Butler	Unanimous decision		
	NO-GI	(England) Paul Redmond	def.	(Greece) Christian Ozbek	Unanimous decision		
	NO-GI	(England) Jack Tyley	def.	(England) Nathan Jones	Kimura		
	NO-GI	(Australia) Ben Hodgkinson	def.	(England) Dave Weston	Arm-triangle choke		
	NO-GI	(Poland) Pawel Jaworski	def.	(England) Faris Ben-lamkadem	Unanimous decision		
	NO-GI	(Italy) Martina Zola	def.	(Italy) Francesca Lana	Armbar		
	NO-GI	(England) Hejraat Rashid	def.	(England) Sam Gibbs	Rear-naked choke		
	NO-GI	(Hungary) Norbert Novenyi	def.	(England) Steve O’Keefe	Rear-naked choke		
	NO-GI	(Italy) Dinu Bucalet	def.	(United States) Craig Young	Rear-naked choke		
	NO-GI	(England) Harry Loosely	def.	(Italy) Jean Maltese	Unanimous decision		
	NO-GI	(Brazil) Romao Carvalho	def.	(England) Muhammad Mustafa	Unanimous decision		
	NO-GI	(England) Reiss Bailey	def.	(England) Tommy Yip	Unanimous decision		

=== 2025 in Polaris: Squads Intercontintental Championship ===
Polaris announced that 2025 would feature their first Squads Intercontinental Championship, played out across multiple events throughout the year.

==== Polaris Squads Intercontinental Championship Bracket ====
Semi Finals
North America	12
Europe	18
Asia & Oceania
South America

Finals
Europe

==== Polaris 31: Europe vs North America ====
Polaris 31
- Promotion: Polaris
- Date: February 8, 2025
- Venue: Doncaster Dome
- City: Doncaster, England

===== Background =====
Polaris 31 featured the first semi-final of the Polaris Squads Intercontinental Championship 2025, between Europe and North America. Owen Jones was originally a member of the Team Europe lineup but he was replaced by Pawel Jaworski after he contracted a staph infection just days before the event. During the half-time break for the Squads match, Anabel Lopez challenged Helena Crevar for the Polaris lightweight title in a featured superfight. Team Europe defeated Team North America by a score of 18-12 and progressed to the final later in the year.

===== Teams =====
European Squad

- (Germany) Jozef Chen
- (Poland) Pawel Jaworski
- (England) Eoghan O’Flanagan
- (Poland) Mateusz Szczecinski
- (England) Taylor Pearman
- (Finland) Santeri Lilius

North American Squad

- (United States) Devhonte Johnson
- (United States) Chris Wojcik
- (Costa Rica) Julian Espinosa
- (United States) PJ Barch
- (Canada) Kieran Kichuk
- (United States) Michael Perez

===== Superfights =====
Polaris 31
Weight Class					Method	Time	Notes
	NO-GI	(England) Helena Crevar	def.	(Spain) Anabel Lopez	Unanimous decision		For the Polaris lightweight title
	NO-GI	(England) Ben Bennett	def.	(England) Jack Grant	Unanimous decision		
	NO-GI	(England) Ellis Younger	def.	(England) Jonathan Wilson	Rear-naked choke		
	NO-GI	(England) Shane Curtis	def.	(England) Fred Greenall	Unanimous decision		
	NO-GI	(England) Chris White	def.	(England) Jack Hampshaw	Unanimous decision		
	NO-GI	(Japan) Yuki Takahashi	def.	(England) Jake Goldthorpe	Ankle-lock		
	NO-GI	(Norway) Selma Vik	def.	(Republic of Ireland) Zara Di Tofano	Arm-triangle choke		
	NO-GI	(England) Carson Coles	def.	(England) Ross Lowery	Unanimous decision		
	NO-GI	(England) Amy Derwanz	def.	(England) Ellie Vipond	Unanimous decision		
	NO-GI	(England) Jamie Faulding	def.	(Republic of Ireland) Kieran O’Brien	Armbar		
	NO-GI	(England) Will Nicholls	def.	(United States) Ian Butler	Unanimous decision		
	NO-GI	(England) Jack Sear	def.	(Palestine) Abraham Dannan	Unanimous decision		
	NO-GI	(England) Chanel O’Brien	def.	(England) Lexi Rook	Kneebar		
	NO-GI	(Albania) Nicolas Koretsis	def.	(England) James Bellingham	Armbar		
	NO-GI	(England) Arren Gurnhill	def.	(England) Jared Eaton	Unanimous decision		
	NO-GI	(England) Archie Hutchison	def.	(England) Rhys James	Unanimous decision		

==== Polaris 32: Female Squads ====
Polaris 32
- Promotion: Polaris
- Date: June 28, 2025
- Venue: Swansea Building Society Arena
- City: Swansea, Wales

===== Background =====
Polaris 32 will mark the first time that there has ever been a female Squads event, with Europe being led by Ffion Davies and North America being led by Helena Crevar. The featured superfight taking place during half-time will see Ashley Williams challenge Keith Krikorian for the Polaris featherweight title.

===== Teams =====
European Squad

- (Wales) Ffion Davies
- (Italy) Margot Ciccarelli
- (European Union)
- (European Union)
- (European Union)
- (European Union)

North American Squad

- (United States) Helena Crevar
- (Canada) Brianna Ste-Marie
- (United States)
- (United States)
- (United States)
- (United States)

== Awards ==
In 2020, Polaris won "Promotion of the year" at the JitsMagazine BJJ Awards.

In 2023, Polaris won "Promotion of the year" at the JitsMagazine BJJ Awards.

== See also ==
- Metamoris
- ADCC Submission Wrestling World Championship
