= Tom Halpin =

Brazilian jiu-jitsu practitioner from Ireland (born 1993)

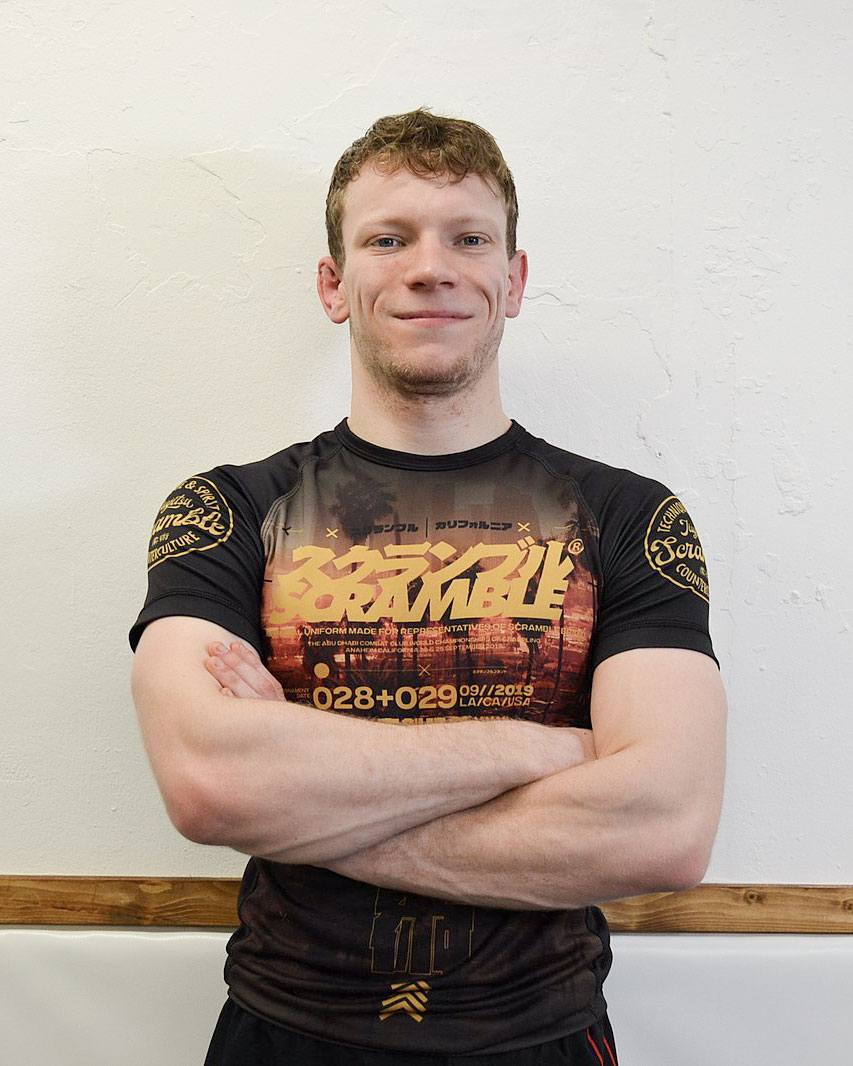
- Born: 9 November 1993 (age 32); Limerick, Ireland
- Division: Feather weight -70 kg (154.3 lb)
- Team: Fight Sports
- Rank: black belt in BJJ (Note: under Roberto "Cyborg" Abreu)

Thomas Halpin is an Irish submission grappler and Brazilian jiu-jitsu black belt competitor. Halpin is a Combat Jiu-Jitsu World Champion, an ADCC European Champion and a black belt European No-Gi medallist, as well as a European No-Gi Open Champion in brown belt.

== Biography ==
Thomas Halpin was born on 9 November 1993 in Limerick, Ireland. He started Brazilian jiu-jitsu in 2011 under Rodrigo Medeiros black belt, Fergal Quinlan, while studying sports and exercise science at university. From 2014 Halpin started going to Miami to train under Robert 'Cyborg' Abreu at Fight Sport from whom he received his brown and black belt in 2017.

Halpin became the first Irishman to qualify and compete at the ADCC World Championship after winning the ADCC European Trials in 2019. In 2020 after submitting all his opponents, including MMA fighter Masakazu Imanari, Halpin became featherweight Combat Jiu-Jitsu World Champion.

He currently competes in the featherweight division for Polaris Pro Grappling, being the number one featherweight contender. During the first Polaris 14 Squads event in September 2020, he defeated Dino Bucalet (from Team EU) via reverse triangle, securing the winning point for Team British Isles. At Polaris 21 Halpin defeated Alessio Sacchetti via unanimous decision.

Halpin competed against Keith Krikorian at Polaris 24 on June 3, 2023 and lost the match by unanimous decision.

== Championships and accomplishments ==
Main Achievements (black belt level):

- ADCC European Trials Winner (2019)
- Combat Jiu-Jitsu World Champion (2020)
- UAEJJF Spain National Pro Champion (2018)
- UAEJJF Netherlands National Pro Champion (2018)
- 3rd place IBJJF European No-Gi Open (2018)

Main Achievements (coloured belts):

- IBJJF European No-Gi Open Champion (2016 brown)
- Grappling Pro Champion (2016 brown)

== Instructor lineage ==
Carlos Gracie > Carlson Gracie > Francisco Toco > Roberto Abreu > Thomas Halpin
