= Ashley Bendle =

Brazilian jiu-jitsu practitioner from Wales (born 1997)

- Born: Ashley Louise Bendle; 29 March 1997 (age 29)
- Nationality: Welsh
- Division: Featherweight -58.5 kg (129.0 lb)
- Style: Brazilian Jiu-Jitsu; Submission Grappling
- Fighting out of: Swansea, Wales
- Team: Draig; Chris Rees Academy (CRA)
- Rank: black belt in BJJ (Note: under Chris Rees)

Other information
- Occupation: BJJ instructor

Ashley Bendle (born 29 March 1997) is a Welsh submission grappler, Brazilian jiu-jitsu practitioner and competitor. A British and European No-Gi champion in coloured belts, Bendle is a black belt No-Gi World, European Open and ADCC trials medalist.

== Early career ==
Ashley Louise Bendle was born on 29 March 1997. She started training Brazilian jiu-jitsu (BJJ) at the age of five. After completing all the youth belts, she received her blue belt at age 16 and started competing in the adult division. Bendle trained in Swansea under Chris Rees, the first Welsh BJJ black belt. (Note: under Braulio Estima) At 17 she won silver at the 2015 IBJJF European Open Championship, competing in the light feather (-53.5 kg) division.

After receiving her purple belt from Rees in 2015, Bendle became British featherweight champion and then won bronze at the European championship. In 2016 she won gold at the European No-Gi Championship. In 2018 she was one of six athletes to be sponsored by the UKBJJA to compete at the IBJJF European Championship in Lisbon where she won bronze. Bendle was promoted to black belt by Rees in 2019.

== Black belt career ==
=== 2021–2022 ===
In September 2021, Bendle fought in the first edition of the ADCC Submission Fighting Championship European Trials taking place in Poland where she arrived second in the -60 kg category.

Competing at Polaris 18 on 27 November 2021, she defeated Kate Bacik via 1 Round Decision. At Polaris 21 on 24 September 2022, Bendle was asked, on just a week's notice, to replace Ffion Davies in a fight for the inaugural under 60 kg title, against multiple-time World and ADCC champion Michelle Nicolini. Bendle lost the fight by split decision but her performance in the match won praises.

At the 2022 IBJJF London International Open, she won two Openweight gold medals, defeating Raquel Ferreira da Silvain in the Gi final and Joanna Dineva in the No-Gi final. In 2022 she won silver at the European No-Gi Championship and bronze at the IBJJF World No-Gi Championship.

=== 2023 onwards ===
In January she won Silver at the 2023 European Championship, after defeating Rafaela Rosa of Checkmat, competing in the featherweight division. Bendle trains alongside Polaris triple champion Ashley Williams.

On 25 February 2023 Bendle fought for the inaugural Enyo Grappling under 55kgs title against Sophia Cassella. She won the match by decision and became the promotion's first champion.

Bendle was invited to compete at the first Kairos Pro Jiu-Jitsu event on 7 May 2023. She won 2 matches out of her 4 matches and was unable to make it out of her round-robin group to compete in the final. She then won a silver medal in the featherweight no gi division of the IBJJF London Fall Open 2023 on 15 October 2023.

Bendle won a silver medal in the featherweight division at the IBJJF No Gi European Championship 2023 on 28 October 2023.

Bendle competed against Mara Kelly for the vacant under 55 kg title at Grapplefest 17 on 18 November 2023. Se won the match by decision.

Bendle competed in the under 55 kg division of the ADCC European, Middle-Eastern, and African Trials 2024. She finished with a silver medal after losing the final to Margot Ciccarelli. She then won a bronze medal in the featherweight division of the IBJJF No Gi European Championship on 20 October 2024.

== Championships and accomplishments ==
Main Achievements (black belt level):

- IBJJF London International Open Champion (2022 (Note: Absolute))
- IBJJF London International Open No-Gi Champion (2022)
- IBJJF London Fall International Open Champion (2022 (Note: Weight and absolute))
- IBJJF London Fall International Open No-Gi Champion (2022)
- IBJJF Paris International Open Champion (2022)
- IBJJF Paris Fall International Open Champion (2022)
- 2nd place ADCC European Trial (2021)
- 2nd place IBJJF European No-Gi Championship (2022)
- 2nd place IBJJF London International Open (2022)
- 2nd place IBJJF London International Open No-Gi (2022)
- 3rd place IBJJF World No-Gi Championship (2022)
- 3rd place IBJJF European Championship (2022 / 2023)
- 3rd place IBJJF London International Open (2023)

Main Achievements (coloured belt level):

- IBJJF European No-Gi Champion (2016 purple)
- Naga Elite Gi champion (2017)
- British champion (2017 purple)
- 2nd place IBJJF European Championship (2015 blue)
- 2nd place IBJJF British National Championship (2015 purple)
- 3rd place IBJJF European Championship (2019 brown)
- 3rd place IBJJF European Championship (2018 purple)
- 3rd place IBJJF European Championship (2016 purple)
- 3rd place IBJJF British National Championship (2018 purple)

== Instructor lineage ==
Carlos Gracie > Helio Gracie > Carlos Gracie Jr > Braulio Estima > Chris Rees > Ashley Bendle
