= Abdullah Al Salmani =

Iraqi Jiu-Jitsu player and mixed martial artist

- Born: December 23, 1999 (age 26); United Arab Emirates
- Team: Al Ain Jiu-Jitsu Club (2017 - 2021); Sharjah Self-Defence Sports Club (2021 - now)

Abdullah Mohamed Al Salmani (Arabic: عبدالله محمد السلماني; born December 23, 1999) is an Iraqi Jiu-Jitsu practitioner and mixed martial artist who represents the Sharjah Self-Defence Sports Club since 2021.

== Early life and education ==
Al Salmani was born in the United Arab Emirates. He graduated from Abu Dhabi University with a BSc degree in Electrical Engineering and has achieved second place in the Research Collaboration Competition "X Research" in 2021 with "Smart Photovoltaic Modules" project.

== Career ==
Al Salmani began his career as a Romanian wrestler in 2013. In 2017, he joined Al Ain Jiu-Jitsu Club as a Jiu-Jitsu professional registered player in the UAE Jiu-Jitsu Federation. In 2018, Al Salmani earned a bronze medal at Fujairah Dubai Pro Jiu-Jitsu Championship, and won a silver medal at Fujairah International Pro Jiu-Jitsu Championship in 2019.

In the 2018-2019 and the 2019–2020 seasons, Al Salmani came in first place in the absolute white belt divisions among Iraqi athletes in the men's category (18 and 30 years old). In December 2019, Al Salmani received the Fan of the Month award in honor of his support to Al Ain Club through the 2019/2020 Arabian Gulf League campaign initiatives.

Al Salmani earned his blue belt at the end of the 2020 season, after which he moved to represent the Sharjah Self-Defense Sports Club during the 2021-2022 sports season.

== Championships ==
- Dubai International Pro Jiu-Jitsu Championship — Bronze Medal (2017 - 2018).
- Fujairah International Pro Jiu-Jitsu Championship — Silver Medal (2018 - 2019).
- Al Ain International Pro Jiu-Jitsu Championship — (2018 - 2019).
- Abu Dhabi Grand Slam Jiu-Jitsu Work Tour — (2018 - 2019).
- Abu Dhabi World Professional Jiu-Jitsu Championship — (2018 - 2019).
- Fujairah International Pro Jiu-Jitsu Championship — (2019 - 2020).
- Al Ain International Pro Jiu-Jitsu Championship — (2019 - 2020).
- AJP Tour UAE National Pro Jiu-Jitsu Championship — (2021 - 2022).
- AJP Tour Asia Continental Pro — (2021 - 2022).
