= Gezary Matuda =

Brazilian jiu-jitsu practitioner from Brazil (born 1983

- Born: Gezary Matuda Bandeira; 12 July 1983 (age 43); Curitiba, Brazil
- Other names: Gezary Matuda Kubis Bandeira
- Division: Light Feather (−53.5 kg)
- Fighting out of: Coconut Creek, Florida
- Team: American Top Team
- Teacher: Alexandre Penão
- Trainer: Ricardo Libório
- Rank: BJJ black belt (Note: under Ricardo Libório)

Other information
- Occupation: BJJ instructor and coach
- Website: gezary

Gezary Matuda is a Brazilian jiu-jitsu black belt practitioner from Brazil. A two-time World and Pan Champion in colored belts, she is a three-time IBJJF World Champion, a three-time Pan American Champion, and a European Open black belt Champion.

== Career ==
Gezary Matuda Bandeira was born on 12 July 1983 in Curitiba, Brazil. Matuda started training Brazilian jiu-jitsu (BJJ) in 2004, in addition to Capoeira and Muay Thai. Her first BJJ teacher was Carlos ‘Penão’ Alexandre Conceição, a black belt under Carlson Gracie, from whom she received all her belts from white to purple. She kept training in Muay Thai, one of her first teachers being Anderson Silva. As a blue belt in 2009, she won the CBJJF South American Cup then the CBJJE World Cup.

In 2009 Matuda and her husband, ATT pro-team Muay Thai coach Katel Kubis moved to the United States. Matuda began training under Ricardo Libório at American Top Team. As a purple belt she won the IBJJF Pan American followed by the 2010 IBJJF World Championship. In 2011 Matuda won the Pan in the brown belt division, a year later she was promoted to black belt by Liborio in July 2012 after winning the IBJJF World Championship.

As a black belt, she won the World Championship in 2013 and 2014. Competing at Polaris 2 Pro Grappling on 12 September 2015 in Cardiff, Wales, she submitted Michelle Nicolini in 15 seconds with a flying armbar. She became black belt 2015 Pan American Champion, then won silver at the 2015 World Championship facing Rikako Yuasa in the final. In April 2016 at Polaris 3, her fight against Laurence Cousin ended in a draw. That same year she won the 2016 World Championship for the third time as a black belt and the Pan American Championship. Facing Talita Alencar in the final of the World Championship light feather division, she won silver in 2017. In 2018 she became Pan Champion for the third time and then won bronze at the World Championship. Competing against Ffion Davies at Polaris 9 in March 2019 in London, Matuda was defeated via Submission. At the 2019 World Championship Matuda won bronze.

== Championships and accomplishments ==
Main Achievements (at black belt):

- IBJJF World Champion (2016/2014/2013)
- IBJJF Pan American Champion (2018/2016/2015)
- IBJJF European Open Champion (2017)
- 2nd place IBJJF World Championship (2015/2017)
- 3rd place IBJJF World Championship (2018/2019)

Main Achievements (at colored Belts):

- IBJJF World Champion (2012 brown, 2010 purple)
- IBJJF Pan American Champion (2011 brown, 2010 purple)
- CBJJE World Cup Champion (2009 blue)
- CBJJF South American Cup Champion (2009 blue)

== Instructor lineage ==
Mitsuyo Maeda > Carlos Gracie > Carlson Gracie > Ricardo Libório > Gezary Matuda
