= Vanessa English =

Brazilian jiu-jitsu practitioner from England

- Born: 9 May 1989 (age 37)
- Nickname: Vanessita
- Division: GI Weight Classes: Super feather 53.5 kg; Featherweight 58.5 kg
- Style: Brazilian Jiu-Jitsu
- Team: Gracie Barra
- Trainer: Victor Estima, Gareth Neale
- Rank: BJJ black belt (Note: under Victor Estima)

Vanessa English (born 9 May 1989), is a Brazilian jiu-jitsu black belt competitor and instructor. In coloured belt she is a multiple-time European champion, in both Gi and No-Gi, and is the first British-born Brazilian Jiu-Jitsu competitor to win the IBJJF World Championships. English is a 2018 World Championship black belt medallist and the 2018 European Open black belt Champion.

== Career ==
Vanessa English was born on 9 May 1989 in King's Lynn, Norfolk, England. At the age of 16 she started Capoeira, followed by Japanese jujutsu, then in 2009 Brazilian jiu-jitsu at Gracie Barra Derby under Pat and Steven Martin; here she began competing as a white belt. In 2012 she moved to Nottingham at another Gracie Barra academy under Victor Estima and Gareth Neale. As a blue belt she won the British Open Championship in both Gi and No-Gi then won bronze at the 2011 World Championship. English started training daily, sometimes following her night shifts as a home carer in Nottingham. After receiving her purple belt in 2012, English won the British Open again. In 2013 she became world champion and European champion after winning the 2013 World Championship, the 2013 European Open Championship and the 2013 European Open No-Gi Championship, she became the first British born Brazilian Jiu Jitsu competitor to win the IBJJF World Championships in the adult division. After receiving her brown belt in 2014, she won the IBJJF London International Open then won the European Champion two years in a row (2014 & 2015), also winning bronze in the Open Class in 2014.

== Black belt career ==
On 7 June 2015, English was upgraded to black belt by Victor Estima. As a black belt English won the 2018 Brazilian Jiu-Jitsu European Championship after defeating Livia Gluchowska in the light-featherweight's division finale. and the Abu Dhabi Grand Slam London. In 2018 she won bronze at the 2018 World Jiu-Jitsu Championship taking place in Long Beach, California, In 2023 she won gold at the IBJJF London Open competing in the light division.

English was invited to compete at the first Kairos Pro Jiu-Jitsu event on May 7, 2023. She registered 3 wins and 1 draw to win her group and progress to the final, followed by defeating Gabi Schuck by decision to win the tournament.

English was invited to compete at Grapplefest 16 on July 1, 2023 for the promotion's vacant under 60kgs title against Adele Fornarino. English lost the match by decision.

== Brazilian Jiu-Jitsu competitive summary ==
Main Achievements (Black Belt)

- IBJJF European Champion (2018)
- Abu Dhabi Grand Slam London Champion (2017)
- IBJJF London International Open champion (2023)
- IBJJF London Winter Open Champion (2017)
- 2nd place Abu Dhabi World Pro Championship (2017)
- 2nd place IBJJF London Winter Open (2017 (Note: Absolute))
- 3rd place IBJJF London International Open (2023)
- 3rd place IBJJF World Championship (2018)

Main Achievements (Coloured Belts)

- IBJJF World Champion (2013 purple)
- IBJJF European Champion (2013 purple, 2014/2015 brown)
- IBJJF European Open No-Gi Champion (2013 purple)
- IBJJF London Open Champion (2014 brown)
- 3rd place IBJJF World Championship (2011 blue)
- 3rd place IBJJF European Champion (2014 brown)

== Instructor lineage ==
Mitsuyo Maeda > Carlos Gracie > Helio Gracie > Carlos Gracie Jr. > Victor Estima > Vanessa English
