= Michelle Nicolini =

Brazilian practitioner of Brazilian Jiu-Jitsu and mixed martial arts

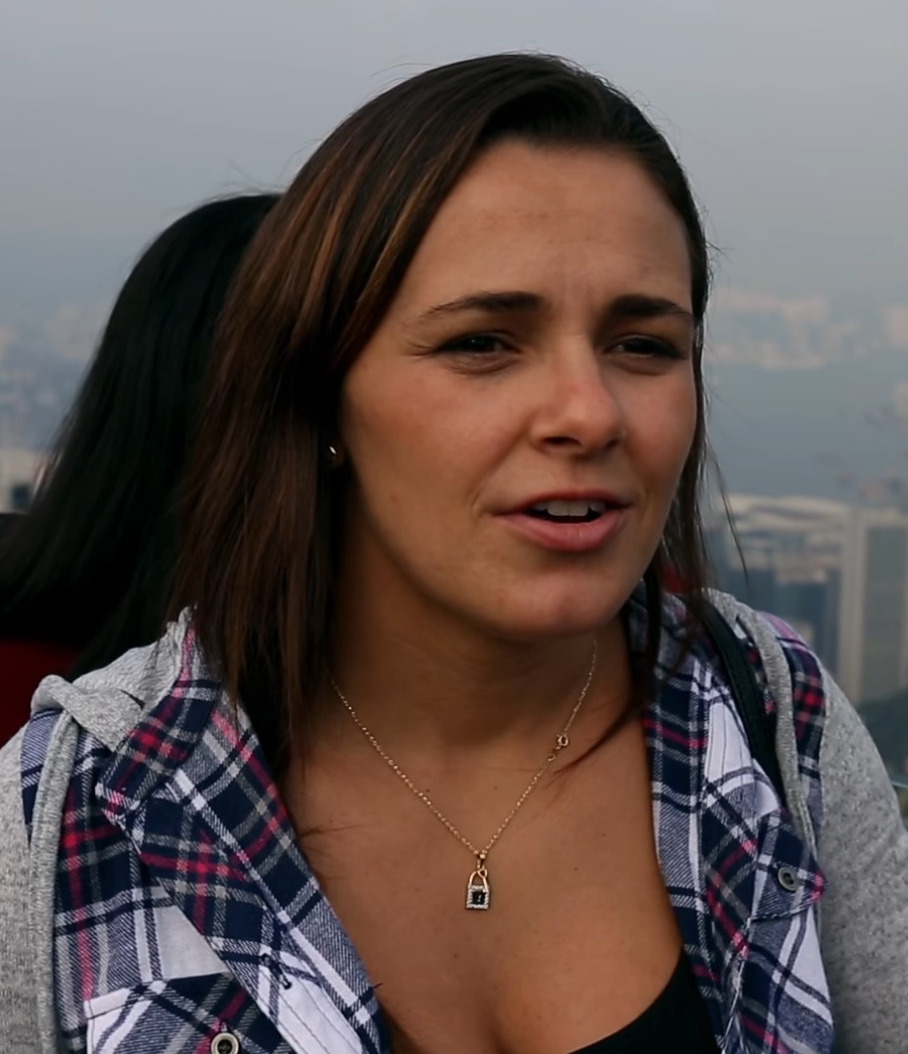
- Born: Michelle Zonato Nicolini; January 5, 1982 (age 44); Itú, São Paulo, Brazil
- Height: 5 ft 5 in (165 cm)
- Weight: 125 lb (57 kg; 8 st 13 lb)
- Division: Strawweight (125 lbs)
- Style: Brazilian Jiu-Jitsu
- Team: Checkmat, Evolve MMA
- Rank: Black belt in Brazilian Jiu-Jitsu

Mixed martial arts record
- Total: 9
- Wins: 6
- By submission: 5
- By decision: 1
- Losses: 3
- By decision: 3

Other information
- Mixed martial arts record from Sherdog

Michelle Zonato Nicolini or Michelle Nicolini (born January 5, 1982) is a Brazilian Jiu-Jitsu practitioner and mixed martial artist (MMA). Among the most accomplished female grapplers of all time, Nicolini holds third place for most IBJJF World Championship titles, with eight wins. She is a member of the IBJJF Hall of Fame.

== Grappling career ==
Nicolini was born in the city of Itú in Brazil. At the age of 14 she started Capoeira stopping 3 years later to focus on jiu-jitsu, training under Robert Drysdale, who she received her black belt from. In 2015 she competed twice at Polaris Pro Grappling beating Angelica Galvao via toehold and losing to Gezary Matuda via armbar.

Nicolini was scheduled to compete against Ffion Davies at Polaris 21 on September 24, 2022, for the promotion's inaugural bantamweight title Davies withdrew from the match and was replaced by Ashley Bendle on short notice. Nicolini defeated Bendle by split decision and won the Polaris bantamweight title.

Nicolini competed in the IBJJF Master International Championship - Europe on April 30, 2023 where she won gold medals in the lightweight and absolute divisions at Master 2.

== Brazilian Jiu-Jitsu competitive summary ==
In the major IBJJF gi championships at black belt level she is a:-

8x World Championship champion
3x Pan-American Championship champion
3x European Championship champion
3x Brazilian Nationals champion

2022 European Master 1 Lightweight Champion

In the major IBJJF Nogi championships at black belt level she is a:-

4x World Nogi Championship champion
2x Pan Ams Nogi Championship champion
2x Euros Nogi Championship champion

She is also a 4x ADCC medal winner – 1x Gold, 2x Silver and 1x Bronze.

By winning the Brazilian Nationals Nogi Championship Michelle would become the first female athlete to complete a clean sweep of winning a gold medal at black belt level in both gi and no-gi at all four major championships.

== Mixed martial arts career ==
=== Early career ===
Nicolini was scheduled to face Cristina Meija at Inka FC 11 on June 23, 2011, in her mixed martial arts debut. She won the fight by a first-round submission.

Nicolini was scheduled to face Lanchana Green at M4TC 13: Nemesis on February 22, 2014. She won the fight by a first-round submission.

Nicolini was scheduled to face Norma Rueda Center at Legacy FC 36 October 17, 2014. Nicolini suffered her first professional loss, as Norma won by unanimous decision.

=== ONE Championship ===
On July 25, 2016, it was revealed that Nicolini had signed with the Singapore-based fight promotion ONE Championship.

Nicolini was scheduled to face Mona Samir at ONE Championship: Defending Honor on November 16, 2016. She won the fight by a first-round submission.

Nicolini was scheduled to face Irina Mazepa at ONE Championship: Kings of Destiny on April 21, 2017. She won the fight by a first-round submission.

Nicolini was scheduled to face Iryna Kyselova at ONE Championship: Visions of Victory on March 8, 2018. She won the fight by a first-round submission.

Nicolini was scheduled to face Tiffany Teo, in a ONE strawweight title eliminator, at ONE Championship: Heart of the Lion on November 9, 2018. Teo won the fight by unanimous decision, handing Nicolini her second professional loss.

Nicolini was scheduled to face the reigning ONE Women's Atomweight champion Angela Lee, in a strawweight bout, at ONE Championship: Masters of Destiny on July 12, 2019. Despite coming into the bout as an underdog, and being on the receiving end of several uncalled fouls, Nicolini won the fight by unanimous decision.

Nicolini challenged the reigning ONE Women's Strawweight World champion Xiong Jingnan at ONE Championship: Empower on September 3, 2021. It was originally scheduled for May 28, 2021, before being postponed due to COVID-19. She lost the bout via unanimous decision, unable to get her opponent to the ground and losing the striking exchanges.

== Mixed martial arts record ==
Professional record breakdown
9 matches	6 wins	3 losses
By knockout	0	0
By submission	5	0
By decision	1	3

Res.	Record	Opponent	Method	Event	Date	Round	Time	Location	Notes
Loss	6–3	Xiong Jingnan	Decision (unanimous)	ONE: Empower	September 3, 2021	5	5:00	Kallang, Singapore	For the ONE Strawweight Championship (125 lb).
Win	6–2	Angela Lee	Decision (unanimous)	ONE: Masters of Destiny	July 12, 2019	3	5:00	Kuala Lumpur, Malaysia	
Loss	5–2	Tiffany Teo	Decision (unanimous)	ONE: Heart of the Lion	November 9, 2018	3	5:00	Kallang, Singapore	
Win	5–1	Iryna Kyselova	Submission (rear-naked choke)	ONE: Visions of Victory	March 9, 2018	1	2:26	Kuala Lumpur, Malaysia	
Win	4–1	Irina Mazepa	Submission (armbar)	ONE: Kings of Destiny	April 21, 2017	1	2:11	Pasay, Philippines	
Win	3–1	Mona Samir	Submission (rear-naked choke)	ONE: Defending Honor	November 16, 2016	1	2:16	Kallang, Singapore	
Loss	2–1	Norma Rueda Center	Decision (unanimous)	Legacy FC 36	October 17, 2014	3	5:00	Albuquerque, New Mexico, United States	
Win	2–0	Lanchana Green	Submission (armbar)	M4TC 13: Nemesis	February 22, 2014	1	2:27	Tyne and Wear, England	
Win	1–0	Cristina Meija	Submission (armbar)	Inka FC 11	June 23, 2011	1	2:36	Santiago de Surco, Peru	
