= AJ Agazarm =

American Brazilian jiu-jitsu practitioner and mixed martial artist

- Born: July 26, 1989 (age 37); Florida, U.S.
- Other names: Leão
- Height: 5 ft 8 in (173 cm)
- Weight: 145 lb (66 kg; 10 st 5 lb)
- Division: Lightweight, featherweight
- Style: Submission grappling
- Fighting out of: Stockton, California
- Team: Ohio State; Nick Diaz Academy; Gracie Barra
- Rank: Black belt in Brazilian jiu-jitsu (Note: under Eduardo de Lima and Carlos Gracie Jr.)
- Wrestling: NCAA Division I wrestling

Mixed martial arts record
- Total: 5
- Wins: 3
- By submission: 2
- By decision: 1
- Losses: 2
- By decision: 2

Amateur record
- Total: 8
- Wins: 8
- By knockout: 2
- By submission: 6

Other information
- Mixed martial arts record from Sherdog

AJ Agazarm (born July 26, 1989) is an American submission grappler and mixed martial artist.

A multiple-time champion in colored belts, Agazarm is a black belt world no-gi champion, Pan American no-gi champion, Brazilian national no-gi champion, European no-gi champion as well as an ADCC World Championship runner-up. In 2019, Agazarm started a professional MMA career by signing with Bellator.

== Early life and education ==
Agazarm was born in Florida and is of Armenian descent. He began wrestling as a sophomore in high school. He performed well enough in high school to win a wrestling scholarship to University of the Cumberlands in Williamsburg, Kentucky from 2005-2007. Agazarm then transferred to Ohio State, a highly ranked NCAA Division I wrestling program. Agazarm graduated summa cum laude and as an Academic All-American.

== Submission grappling career ==
Agazarm was awarded his black belt in Brazilian jiu jitsu in 2013 by Eduardo de Lima and Carlos Gracie Jr. That same year Agazarm got third place at the Pan Jiu-Jitsu No-Gi Championship in the black belt open-weight division and first in the lightweight division. Later in 2013 at the World Nogi Brazilian Jiu-Jitsu Championship Agazarm placed third in the under 73.5 kg black belt division. In 2017, Agazarm won a silver medal at the ADCC Submission Wrestling World Championship in the under 66 kg weight class and another silver at the World No-Gi Jiu-Jitsu Championship in the lightweight division.

=== 2021-2023 ===
On November 6, 2021, Agazarm competed against Celsinho Vinicius at BJJ Stars 7, losing the match on points.

Agazarm then faced English grappler Jed Hue at Polaris 18 on November 27, 2021. He lost the match by decision.

In 2022, Agazarm received an invite to compete in the 66 kg division of the 2022 ADCC World Championship. Agazarm lost to Jeremy Skinner on points in the opening round and was eliminated from the tournament.

Agazarm competed in the IBJJF Nashville Spring Open on April 22, 2023 and took silver in the middleweight division.

=== 2024 ===
Agazarm won a gold medal in the middleweight division of the IBJJF Orange County Open on April 21, 2024.

Agazarm competed in Season 6 of the Professional Grappling Federation on April 21–26, 2024. He was drafted on to Team Epic Roll under Roger Gracie as the third-round pick. He did not make it to the playoffs and went out in the regular season.

Agazarm competed against Lucas 'Hulk' Barbosa at Pit Submission Series 5 on May 30, 2024. He lost the match by decision. Agazarm faced Ruan Alvarenga at ADXC 5 on August 3, 2024. He lost the match by unanimous decision.

Agazarm competed against Piter Frank in the co-main event of Pit Submission Series 8 on October 11, 2024. He won the match by decision.

== Championships and accomplishments ==
2018

- (silver) IBJJF Pan Nogi (Black Belt 73.5 kg)

2017

- (gold) IBJJF European No-Gi (Black Belt 73.5 kg)
- (silver) IBJJF European No-Gi (Black Belt Absolute)
- (silver) ADCC 2017 World Championship (66 kg)
- (silver) IBJJF Nogi World Championships (Black Belt 73.5 kg)
- (silver) IBJJF Rome International Open (Black Belt Absolute)

2016

- (bronze) IBJJF Nogi World Championships (Black Belt 73.5 kg)

2015

- (silver) IBJJF Pan American (Black Belt 76 kg)

2014

- (gold) IBJJF Nogi World Championships (Black Belt 73.5 kg)
- (gold) IBJJF European No-Gi (Black Belt 73.5 kg)
- (gold) IBJJF European No-Gi (Black Belt Absolute)
- (silver) IBJJF Pan Nogi (Black Belt Absolute)
- (bronze) IBJJF Pan Nogi (Black Belt 73.5 kg)
- (bronze) IBJJF European Open (Black Belt 76 kg)

2013

- (gold) IBJJF Pan Nogi (Black Belt 73.5 kg)
- (bronze) IBJJF Pan Nogi (Black Belt Absolute)
- (gold) CBJJ Brazilian Nogi Championship (Black Belt 73.5 kg)
- (silver) CBJJ Brazilian Nogi Championship (Black Belt Absolute)
- (gold) IBJJF European No-Gi (Black Belt 73.5 kg)
- (silver) IBJJF European No-Gi (Black Belt Absolute)
- (silver) IBJJF American National Championship (76 kg)
- (silver) IBJJF American National Championship (Absolute)
- (bronze) IBJJF Nogi World Championships (Black Belt 73.5 kg)
- (silver) CBJJ Brazilian Championship (Brown Belt Absolute)
- (bronze) CBJJ Brazilian Championship (Brown Belt 76 kg)
- (bronze) IBJJF European Open (Brown Belt 76 kg)

== Mixed martial arts career ==
Prior to turning professional Agazarm compiled an 8–0 amateur MMA record. Agazarm made his professional debut at Bellator 214 on January 26, 2019. He lost to Jesse Roberts by split decision fighting at a catchweight of 160 lbs. He went on to win his next three fights for Bellator against Jacob Landin at Bellator 224, Johnathan Quiroz at Bellator 228 and Adel Altamimi at Bellator 238.

Agazarm lost his fifth professional fight against Cris Lencioni by unanimous decision at Bellator 243. He suffered a severe injury to his knee in the first round.

On October 27, 2020, Bellator announced that Agazarm had been released from the promotion due to injury, but will revisit in future.

== Mixed martial arts record ==
Professional record breakdown
| 5 matches | 3 wins | 2 losses |
| By submission | 2 | 0 |
| By decision | 1 | 2 |

| Res. | Record | Opponent | Method | Event | Date | Round | Time | Location | Notes |
|---|---|---|---|---|---|---|---|---|---|
| Loss | 3–2 | Cris Lencioni | Decision (unanimous) | Bellator 243 | August 7, 2020 | 3 | 5:00 | Uncasville, Connecticut, United States | |
| Win | 3–1 | Adel Altamimi | Submission (triangle choke) | Bellator 238 | January 25, 2020 | 3 | 1:22 | Inglewood, California, United States | |
| Win | 2–1 | Jonathan Quiroz | Decision (unanimous) | Bellator 228 | September 28, 2019 | 3 | 5:00 | Inglewood, California, United States | Featherweight debut. |
| Win | 1–1 | Jacob Landin | Submission (rear-naked choke) | Bellator 224 | July 12, 2019 | 1 | 4:21 | Thackerville, Oklahoma, United States | Lightweight debut. |
| Loss | 0–1 | Jesse Roberts | Decision (split) | Bellator 214 | January 30, 2019 | 3 | 5:00 | Inglewood, California, United States | Catchweight bout (160 lbs.) |

== Instructor lineage ==
Mitsuyo Maeda > Carlos Gracie Sr. > Helio Gracie > Carlos Gracie Jr. (> Eduardo de Lima) > AJ Agazarm

== Personal life ==
Agazarm also teaches Brazilian jiu-jitsu at his academy in Atascadero, CA and promoted his younger brother Anthony, who is also a competitor, to purple belt in March 2023.

== See also ==
- List of male mixed martial artists
