= Roberto Jimenez (grappler) =

Brazilian jiu-jitsu practitioner from Ecuador

- Born: Roberto Francisco Jimenez; 19 May 2000 (age 26); Miami, Florida, U.S.
- Nickname: The Natural
- Nationality: American / Ecuadorian
- Division: Heavy (86-88 kg /189-194 lbs)
- Fighting out of: Las Vegas, Nevada
- Team: Studio 76; Alliance Team Gacho
- Trainer: Raul Jimenez (Gacho); Lucas Lepri and Romero Cavalcanti
- Rank: BJJ black belt (Note: under Raul Jimenez)

Roberto Jimenez (born 19 May 2000) is an American-born Ecuadorian grappler and Brazilian jiu-jitsu (BJJ) black belt competitor.

A multiple-time World, Pan and American Nationals champion in juvenile and lower belt divisions, Jimenez is the 2022 ADCC South America Trials winner, 2022 Polaris middleweight GP champion, and 2023 World IBJJF Jiu-Jitsu No-Gi Championship absolute division champion.

== Biography ==
=== Early life ===
Roberto Francisco Jimenez was born on 19 May 2000 in Miami, Florida, the son of Ecuadorian parents. He started Brazilian jiu-jitsu at the age of 4 encouraged by his father Muay Thai and BJJ practitioner Raul "Gacho" Jimenez. During his first years, the family lived in South America, then when he was 10 moved to Texas where Jimenez joined an Alliance Jiu Jitsu academy. Jimenez went through all the kids BJJ belts before receiving his blue belt.

=== Early career ===
At 15 Jimenez defeated UFC's MMA fighter Sage Northcutt in a grappling competition. In 2016 he was invited to compete at Royal Invitational – The Future of Jiu-Jitsu, his first pro tournament, while he was the youngest competitor he won all his fights via submission. Competing in the super heavyweight division that year he won the 2016 World Jiu-Jitsu Championship as well as the following year in the Juvenile 2 super heavyweight blue division. Jimenez became known for defeating black and brown belts in tournaments such as Fight to Win Europa 2016 where he submitted featherweight black belt Lucas Pinheiro.

At purple belt trained by his father and Lucas Lepri, he became 2018 IBJJF World champion in the adult division after submitting all his opponents, winning double gold in his weight and in openweight after defeating MMA fighter Mason Fowler in the final. He became known as "The Natural" after a patch on the Gi he was wearing during the competition read: “All Natural Steroid Free BJJ” which prompted a debate about competitors using PEDs. He finished second in February at the ADCC North American West Coast Pro Trials after losing to black belt and MMA fighter DJ Jackson. In August 2018, he was promoted to brown belt level by his father and Romero Jacare Cavalcanti during an Alliance Seminar. In 2019 he became World No-Gi Champion in Absolute, winning silver in his weight class, Pan No-Gi Champion, winning also double gold at the American Nationals (both Gi and No-Gi). In 2019 he won Pan No-Gi at heavyweight and took bronze in the open class then No-GI World where he won the absolute division after submitting all his opponents but came second in his division.

=== Black belt career ===
==== 2019-2021 ====
At No-GI World 2019 Jimenez was promoted to black belt by his father, On 8 February 2020 Jimenez made his black belt debut at FloGrappling's Who's No. 1 where he defeated against all odds, BJJ grand slam champion Keenan Cornelius 6–4. In July 2020 he entered Third Coast Grappling (3CG) an invitational tournament, at 3CG Kumite III Jimenez defeated Tye Ruotolo in first round on points. At 3CG Kumite V Jimenez submitted WNO 155 lb champion Kade Ruotolo in the semi-final, before winning the final against his brother Tye Ruotolo again.

In October 2020 Jimenez lost to Craig Jones at WNO 4 then defeated Dante Leon at the December 2020 edition of the tournament via 1 Round Decision. In February 2021at WNO co-main event, he lost to Gordon Ryan, replacing his brother Nicky Ryan who pulled out due to injury. Jimenez submitted four opponents in June 2021 to win Eddie Bravo’s Combat Jiu-Jitsu Worlds welterweight title. At Polaris Squads 3 in August 2021 Jimenez was a member of Team USA who won the tournament. After winning the 2022 ADCC South America Trials, Jimenez entered the 77 kg division of the 2022 ADCC World Championship where he won his first match submitting Andy Varela then lost to future ADCC champion Kade Ruotolo. At Polaris 19 in March 2022 he defeated Magid Hage via rear naked choke submission.

==== 2022-2023 ====
In November 2022, Jimenez won the eight-man bracket Polaris 22 middleweight grand prix after submitting two of three opponents. His submission win over Hunter Colvin at the event was awarded with 'Match of the Year' at the 2022 JitsMagazine BJJ Awards. In February 2023, Jimenez entered the IBJJF London Open, winning the gi and no gi heavyweight division, the no gi absolute division, and getting a silver medal in the gi absolute division. He also competed at the IBJJF Miami Open on April 29 and 30, 2023, winning gold medals in the gi and no gi heavyweight division and the absolute division. Jimenez then competed at the IBJJF Houston International Open on May 13 and 14, 2023 where he won gold medals in both the gi and no gi heavyweight divisions, and a bronze medal in the no gi absolute division. Jimenez was then invited to compete in an absolute tournament at UFC Fight Pass Invitational 4 on June 29, 2023. He lost to the eventual winner Nick Rodriguez in the opening round.

Jimenez competed in an 8-man tournament at Blue Collar FC: American Dream Conference on September 1, 2023. He submitted his first two opponents but lost to Giancarlo Bodoni in the final. Jimenez competed in an 8-man absolute grand prix tournament at Polaris 25 on September 30, 2023. He lost in the opening round to Izaak Michell. He then competed at the IBJJF No-Gi World Championship 2023, where he won the absolute division and earned a bronze medal in the heavyweight division.

==== 2024 ====
Jimenez will compete in the IBJJF No Gi Absolute Grand Prix on February 29, 2024.

Jimenez competed against Nick Rodriguez in the co-main event of UFC Fight Pass Invitational 6 on March 3, 2024. He lost the match on points.

Jimenez represented Team Kasai in the under 91 kg division at the AIGA Champions League Brazil Qualifier 2024 on May 23–25. He won all three of his matches and Team Kasai won the tournament.

Jimenez was due to compete in the 2024 ADCC World Championship but he withdrew from the event in order to enter the under 80 kg division of the Craig Jones Invitational on August 16–17, 2024. He was submitted by Levi Jones-Leary in the opening round.

Jimenez competed against Kaynan Duarte in the main event of Who's Number One 25 on December 4, 2024. He lost the match by decision.

==== 2025 ====
Jimenez faced Elder Cruz at Who's Number One 26 on February 7, 2025. He won the match by submission. He then won silver medals in both the heavyweight and absolute divisions of the IBJJF Pan Championship 2025.

Jimenez came in as a late-replacement in the middleweight grand prix at BJJ Stars 15 on April 26, 2025. He won his first two matches before losing to Mica Galvão in the final.

Jimenez represented Team Kasai at the AIGA Champions League finals 2025, going 2-1 as Team Kasai won the event.

Jimenez then defeated Bruno Lima on points to win the under 85 kg title at ACBJJ 16 on June 19, 2025.

Jimenez faced Ryan Aitken at Who's Number One 29 on July 25, 2025. He won the match by decision.

== Championships and accomplishments ==
Main Achievements (black belt level):

- ADCC South America Trials winner (2022)
- Polaris MW Grand Prix champion (2022)
- 3CG Kumite III – 180 lbs champion (2020)
- 3CG Kumite IV – 170 lbs champion (2020)
- IBJJF Rio Summer International No-Gi Open champion (2022)
- IBJJF London International No-Gi Open champion (2023 (Note: Absolute))
- IBJJF London International Open champion (2023)
- 2nd place IBJJF London International Open (2023)
- 2nd place 3CG Kumite 6 – ABS (2020)
- 2nd place IBJJF Rio Summer International Open (2022)
- 3rd place IBJJF Rio Summer International Open (2022)

Main Achievements (Colored Belts):

- Fight 2 Win 185 lbs Brown Belt Champion (2019)
- IBJJF World Champion (2018 (Note: Weight and absolute) purple)
- IBJJF World No-Gi Champion (2019 brown)
- IBJJF World Champion Juvenile (2016 / 2017)
- IBJJF World Champion Juvenile No-Gi (2016)
- IBJJF Pans Champion Juvenile (2016 / 2017)
- IBJJF Pans No-Gi Champion (2019 brown)
- IBJJF American Nationals Champion (2019 brown)
- IBJJF IBJJF American Nationals No-Gi Champion(2019 brown)
- IBJJF IBJJF European Open Juvenile Champion (2017)
- IBJJF UAEJJF Grand Slam, TYO Champion (2019 brown)
- IBJJF ROYAL Invitational Champion (2016)
- 2nd place IBJJF World Championship No-Gi (2019 brown)
- 2nd place IBJJF World Championship Juvenile (2016)
- 2nd place UAEJJF Abu Dhabi World Pro (2019 brown)
- 2nd place ACBJJ North America Championship (2018 purple)
- 3rd place IBJJF World Championship Juvenile No-Gi (2016)
- 3rd place IBJJF Pans Championship (2018 purple / 2019 brown)
- 3rd place IBJJF Pans Championship No-Gi (2019 brown)
- 3rd place UAEJJF Abu Dhabi World Pro (2018 purple)

== Personal life ==
Jimenez advocates for BJJ athletes to be free of PEDs such as anabolic steroids. He keeps to a plant-based diet.
