= Venla Luukkonen =

Brazilian jiu-jitsu practitioner from Finland

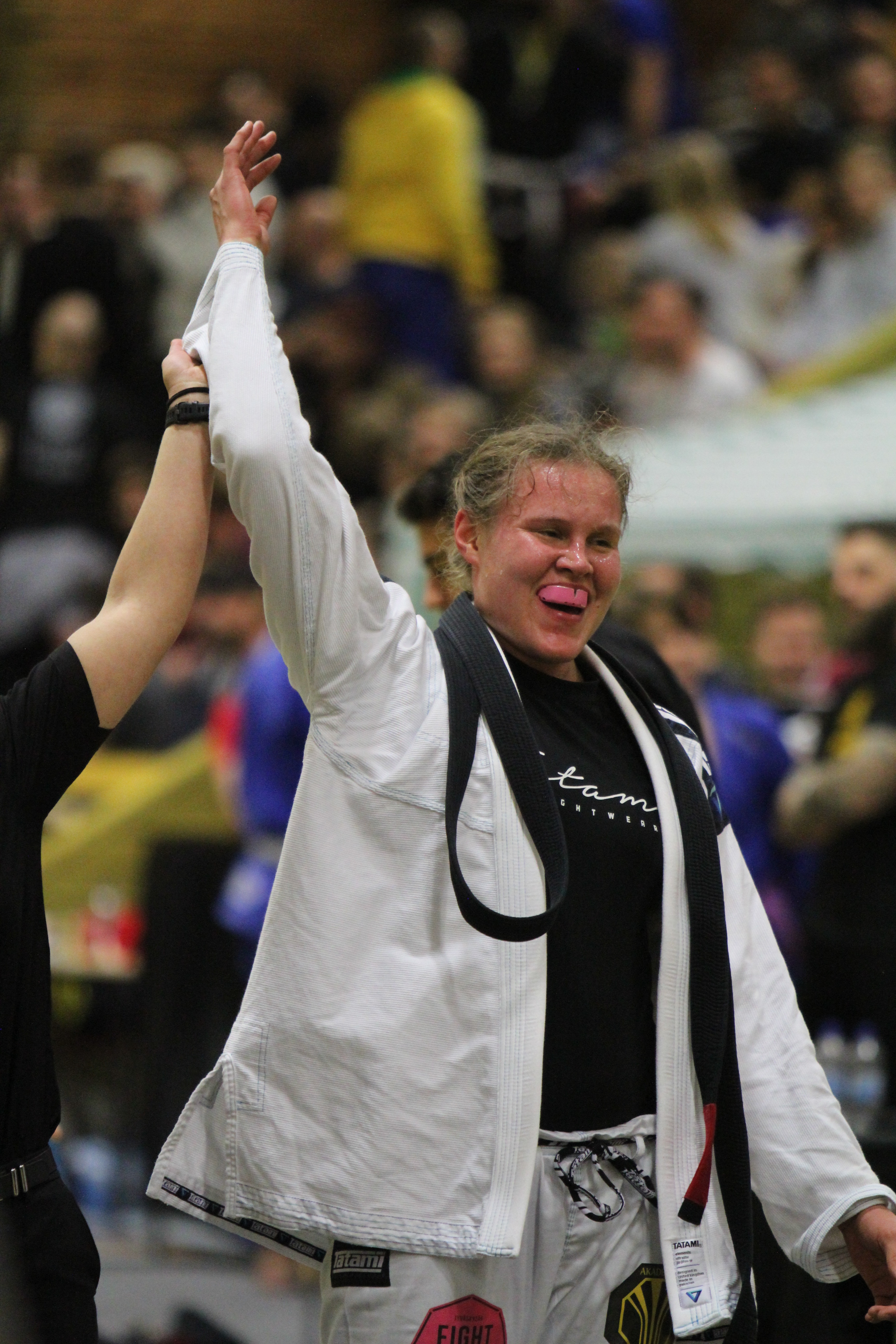
- Luukkonen after winning the 2018 Swedish Open BJJ
- Born: Venla Orvokki Luukkonen; 2 March 1984 (age 42)
- Nationality: Finnish
- Division: Super Heavyweight: Gi: +79.3 kg (175 lb); No-Gi: +76.5 kg (169 lb)
- Style: Brazilian jiu-jitsu
- Team: Grapplingverkstan Örebro IF; Hilti BJJ Jyvaskyla
- Trainer: Pedro Duarte
- Rank: BJJ black belt

Other information
- Occupation: BJJ instructor; Primary school teacher
- University: University of Jyväskylä (PhD, Education)
- Spouse: Hanna Hirvonen
- Website: Grappling Verkstan

Venla Luukkonen (born 2 March 1984) is a Finnish grappler and Brazilian jiu-jitsu competitor and instructor. In 2014, she became the first Finnish female black belt and the first Finn to win the Brazilian Jiu-Jitsu World Championship at black belt level. Since 2014, in addition to winning several major tournaments, Luukkonen reached the world championship final three more times, winning gold again in 2018.

== Early life ==
Venla Orvokki Luukkonen was born on 2 March 1984 in Espoo, Finland. When she was one year old her family moved to Kuopio in Northern Savonia. After secondary school she started training in Capoiera followed by Brazilian Jiu Jitsu in 2008 at Jyväskylän Fight Club (internationally known as Hilti BJJ Jyväskylä) while studying for a PhD in education. She received her blue belt from Kimmo Rautiainen in 2009 then won silver the following year at the 2010 IBJJF World Championship. After receiving her purple belt from Sauli Heilimö she won bronze at the 2011 World Championship and silver at the 2011 ADCC Submission Fighting World Championship European Trials. The following year Luukkonen won gold at the 2012 European Championship. Luukkonen received her brown belt from Marko Leisten in 2012, becoming world champion for the first time in 2013 and winning silver again at the 2013 ADCC European Trials. In 2014 she received double gold by winning both heavyweight division and absolute (openweight) at the European Championship.

== Black belt career ==
Luukkonen received her black belt from former World champion Pedro Duarte on 22 February 2014, becoming the first Finnish female black belt. In 2014 she won the World Jiu-Jitsu Championship after submitting Andrea McComb Pereira via armlock in the final. She became the first Finn to win a world championship at black belt level.

In 2015 Luukkonen won gold at the European No-Gi Championship in two categories, superheavy and absolute, she also won silver at the European Championship then won bronze at the World Championship fighting under team Hilti BJJ Jyvaskyla. In 2016 and 2017 Luukkonen reached the World Championship and the European Championship finals, winning silver both years. Returning to No-Gi, she won bronze at the 2nd 2017 ADCC European Trials in the +60 kilograms (130 lb) division and was invited to compete at the 2017 ADCC World Championship taking place in Finland that year.

Luukkonen became world champion for the second time in 2018 after her opponent in the final, Tayane Porfírio, was disqualified by the USADA (United States Anti-Doping Agency) for testing positive for nandrolone, a prohibited substance. In July 2018, competing in grappling at Polaris 7, Luukkonen won a No-Gi match against Samantha Cook via split judges decision.

In addition to the Swedish Open that she won in 2018, Luukkonen won silver at the 2018 European Open. Luukkonen trains in both Finland and Sweden, she represents Hilti Akademi Nord, where she is one of the head instructors. In 2019 she won silver at the World Championship after facing Claudia do Val in the final. In 2019 and 2020 she won bronze at the European Open. In January 2022 Luukkonen won the ADCC Sweden Tournament 8 that took place in Eskilstuna, Sweden, that same year, competing under Grapplingverkstan Örebro IF, she became Swedish champion after winning in September the SBJJF BJJ 2022.

== Personal life ==
Luukkonen is married to fellow black belt Hanna Hirvonen. Together, they run Grappling Verkstan, a Brazilian jiu-jitsu and Submission Wrestling academy that they founded in 2022, as part of Hilti BJJ, based in Örebro, Sweden.

== Brazilian Jiu-Jitsu competitive summary ==
Main Achievements at black belt level:

- 2 x IBJJF World Champion (2018 / 2014)
- 2 x IBJJF European Champion No-Gi (2015 (Note: Weight and absolute))
- 2nd place IBJJF European Championship (2018 / 2017 / 2016 / 2015)
- 2nd place IBJJF World Championship (2019/2017/2016)
- 3rd place IBJJF World Championship (2015)
- 3rd place IBJJF European Championship (2020 / 2019)

Main Achievements (Coloured Belts):

- IBJJF World Champion (2013 brown)
- 3 x IBJJF European Champion (2014 brown, 2012 purple)
- 2nd place IBJJF World Championship (2012 purple, 2010 Blue)
- 3rd place IBJJF World Championship (2011 purple)
