= Eduardo de Lima =

Brazilian martial artist

Medal record

Brazilian Jiu-Jitsu

Brown belt
Silver medal – second place	Brazilian Tournament 1996	Heavy

Black belt
Gold medal – first place	Brazilian Tournament 1997	Heavy
Gold medal – first place	Brasília DF Tournament	Heavy
Bronze medal – third place	3rd Pan American 1997	Middle
Bronze medal – third place	4th Pan American 1998	Middle
Silver medal – second place	5th Pan American 1999	Middle

Masters black belt
Gold medal – first place	7th Pan American 2001	Medium heavy
Gold medal – first place	8th Pan American 2002	Medium heavy
Bronze medal – third place	9th Pan American 2003	Medium heavy
Gold medal – first place	10th Pan American 2004	Medium heavy

Seniors black belt
Bronze medal – third place	11th Pan American 2005	Medium heavy
Silver medal – second place	21st Pan American 2015	Middle
Silver medal – second place	22nd Pan American 2016	Middle

Eduardo "Veio" de Lima is a 6th degree black belt in Brazilian Jiu-Jitsu (BJJ) under Carlos "Carlinhos" Gracie, Jr. and the head of Gracie Barra Clearwater. He has won several gold medals in the black belt divisions at the Pan American Championships.

Eduardo began training in BJJ at age nineteen after his friend Renzo Gracie recommended he try a class at the Gracie Barra Academy in Rio de Janeiro, Brazil. For the first two years, he studied under Jean Jacques Machado, then the head instructor, who awarded his blue and purple belts before leaving for America. From then on Carlos Gracie, Jr. was his instructor and awarded his brown and then black belt (the latter in 1997 after eight years of training).

As a purple belt, Eduardo was made an instructor for white belts and less experienced blue belts, but by the time he was promoted to brown belt, everyone was attending his class, including black belts. Once he reached the rank of black belt, Eduardo was made the head instructor of Gracie Barra. Roger Gracie, one of the most successful BJJ competitors today, was one of his pupils in the children's class during his tenure as instructor.

In 2000, with the help of Carlos Gracie, Jr. and American businessman Bob Rosseti, Eduardo came to the United States. He taught BJJ out of a Taekwondo dojang in Dunedin, Florida until he was able to start his own school in Clearwater. While in America, he has trained award-winning white, blue, purple, brown and black belt competitors. He is also a member of the Florida Federation of Brazilian Jiu-Jitsu.

== See also ==
- Gracie Barra
