= European IBJJF Jiu-Jitsu No-Gi Championship =

Brazilian Jiu-Jitsu competitions

European No-Gi Brazilian Jiu Jitsu Championship
Competition details
- Location: Rome, Italy
- Nickname(s): No-Gi Euros
- Discipline: Brazilian Jiu-Jitsu
- Type: No-Gi
- Organiser: International Brazilian Jiu-Jitsu Federation

History
- First edition: 2012
- Editions: 9
- Most wins: Male Eduardo Rios (5), Female Venla Luukkonen, Ester Tang, Monique Carvalho (2)

The European No-Gi Brazilian Jiu-Jitsu Championship is a No-Gi Brazilian Jiu-Jitsu (BJJ) tournament hosted annually by the International Brazilian Jiu-Jitsu Federation. It was first held in 2012 in London, England and has been held subsequently each year in Rome, Italy. Below is a table showing the results of the competition since its inception in 2012, including all editions in the adult male and female adult black belt divisions.

== List of European No-Gi Brazilian Jiu-Jitsu Champions Male division, by Year and Weight ==
Year	Host	55.5 kg Rooster	61.5 kg Light Feather	67.5 kg Feather	73.5 kg Light	79.5 kg Middle	85.5 kg M Heavy	91.5 kg Heavy	97.5 kg Super Heavy	No max weight U Heavy	Absolute
2012	(United Kingdom)			(Brazil) Maxmiliano Campos (1/1)	(Brazil) Theodoro Almeida (1/1)	(Brazil) Michael Langhi (1/1)	(Brazil) Eduardo Rios (1/5)	(Brazil) Dimitrius Souza (1/1)	(Brazil) Bernardo Faria (1/2)	(Brazil) Thiago Borges (1/1)	(Brazil) Bernardo Faria (2/2)
2013	(Italy)		(Brazil) Caio Terra (1/2)	(Italy) Simone Franceschini (1/3)	(United States) AJ Agazarm (1/4)	(Brazil) Eduardo Rios (2/5)	(Brazil) Alan do Nascimento (1/1)	(Brazil) Francisco Neto (1/1)	(Brazil) Henrique Pereira (1/1)	(Brazil) Ricardo Evangelista (1/1)	(Brazil) Caio Terra (2/2)
2014	(Italy)		(Brazil) Paulo Melo (1/1)	(Italy) Simone Franceschini (2/3)	(United States) AJ Agazarm (2/4)	(Italy) Luca Anacoreta (1/2)	(Brazil) Eduardo Rios (3/5)	(Brazil) Ricardo Mesquita (1/1)	(Poland) Radoslaw Turek (1/1)	(Brazil) Mauricio Lima (1/1)	(United States) AJ Agazarm (3/4)
2015	(Italy)		(Italy) Simone Franceschini (3/3)	(Brazil) Luiz Tosta (1/1)	(Brazil) Bruno Barbosa (1/1)	(Brazil) Eduardo Rios (4/5)	(Brazil) Charles Negromonte (1/1)	(Brazil) Jackson Sousa (1/2)	(Portugal) Manuel Pontes (1/1)	(Brazil) Luis Carrara (1/1)	(Brazil) Jackson Sousa (2/2)
2016	(Italy)			(United Kingdom) Ashley Williams (1/2)	(Brazil) Thiago Abreu (1/1)	(Brazil) Eduardo Rios (5/5)	(Brazil) Claudio Cardoso (1/1)	(Brazil) Matheus da Silva (1/1)	(United Kingdom) Arya Esfandmaz (1/1)	(Brazil) Ruben Fonseca (1/1)	(Brazil) Lucio Rodrigues (1/1)
2017	(Italy)	(Brazil) Juan da Silva (1/1)		(Brazil) Hiago Silva (1/1)	(United States) AJ Agazarm (4/4)	(Brazil) Isaque Bahiense (1/1)	(Brazil) Stéfano Corrêa (1/1)	(Brazil) Thiago Sa Fortes (1/2)	(Brazil) Mahamed Aly (1/2)	(Brazil) Otavio Serafim (1/1)	(Brazil) Mahamed Aly (2/2)
2018	(Italy)		(France) Anthony De Oliveira (1/1)	(Brazil) Gabriel Marangoni (1/1)	(United States) Michael Liera Jr (1/2)	(Republic of Ireland) Darragh O'Conaill (1/1)	(Italy) Luca Anacoreta (2/2)	(Brazil) Thiago Sa Fortes (2/2)	(France) Thomas Loubersanes (1/2)	(Moldova) Eldar Rafigaev (1/1)	(United States) Michael Liera Jr (2/2)
2019	(Italy)	(Sweden) Gabriel Alexander Rosberg (1/1)	(Brazil) Jonas Andrade (1/1)	(Brazil) Gabriel Sousa (1/1)	(Brazil) Fabio Caloi (1/1)	(Brazil) Jeferson Guaresi (1/1)	(Brazil) Lucas Oliveira (1/1)	(Switzerland) Philippe Pomaski (1/1)	(United States) Devhonte Johnson (1/1)	(France) Thomas Loubersanes (2/2)	(Brazil) Marcelo Gomide (1/1)
2022	(Italy)	(United States) Coco Izutsu (1/1)	(Brazil) Lucas Pinheiro (1/1)	(United Kingdom) Ashley Williams (2/2)	(Brazil) Lucas Rodrigues (1/1)	(Brazil) Igor Feliz (1/1)	(Canada) Oliver Taza (1/1)	(Finland) Santeri Lilius (1/1)	(Brazil) Fernando Reis (1/1)	(United States) Sean Goolsby (1/1)	(Poland) Adam Wardzinski (1/1)
2023	(Italy)	(Scotland) Shay Montague (1/1)	(United States) Edwin Ocasio (1/1)	(Costa Rica) Julian Espinosa (1/1)	(Republic of Ireland) Marcus Phelan (1/1)	(Norway) Tommy Langaker (1/1)	(Costa Rica) Sebastian Rodriguez (1/1)	(Panama) Javier Barter (1/1)	(Denmark) Kasper Larsen (1/1)	(Brazil) Felipe Mauricio (1/1)	(Finland) Heikki Jussila (1/1)
2024	(Italy)	(United States) Christopher Duyquan Tran	(United States) Edwin Ocasio	(Costa Rica) José Julián Espinosa Flores	(Turkey) Yigit Hanay	(Brazil) Fabyury Khrysthyan Texeira Freitas	(Costa Rica) Sebastian Rodriguez Williams	(Italy) Manuel Pilato	(Brazil) Rafael Lovato Jr.	(Finland) Heikki Lauri Eemil Jussila	(Brazil) Gabriel Salles Muniz Almeida

== List of European No-Gi Brazilian Jiu-Jitsu Champions Female division, by Year and Weight ==
Year	Host	-46.5 kg Rooster	-51.5 kg Light Feather	-56.5 kg Feather	-61.5 kg Light	-66.5 kg Middle	-71.5 kg Medium Heavy	-76.5 kg Heavy	+76.5 kg Super Heavy	Absolute
2012	(United Kingdom)					(United Kingdom) Ester Tang (1/2)				(United Kingdom) Ester Tang (2/2)
2015	(Italy)			(United States) Gegi Walker (1/1)			(Brazil) Shanti Abelha (1/1)		(Finland) Venla Luukkonen (1/2)	(Finland) Venla Luukkonen (2/2)
2017	(Italy)		(Sweden) Linda Lindström (1/1)	(Sweden) Maxine Thylin (1/1)			(Brazil) Monique Carvalho (1/2)			(Brazil) Monique Carvalho (2/2)
2018	(Italy)			(United States) Chelsea Leah (1/1)	(Brazil) Michelle Nicolini (1/2)					(Brazil) Michelle Nicolini (2/2)
2019	(Italy)			(Brazil) Ana Talita de Oliveira Alencar	(Germany) Charlotte von Baumgarten	(Norway) Julia Maele		(Brazil) Claudia Fernanda Onofre Valim Doval	(England) Samantha Lea Cook	(Brazil) Ana Talita de Oliveira Alencar
2022	(Italy)		(England) Nina Navid	(Greece) Christina Dimitrios Tsantila	(Germany) Hannah Katharina Rauch	(Norway) Julia Maele	(Wales) Joanna B. Dineva	(Cyprus) Eleftheria Christodoulou	(Cyprus) Eleftheria Christodoulou	
2023	(Italy)		(United States) Mara Kelly	(Australia) Adele M. Fornarino	(Brazil) Maria Cláudia Almeida Silva	(Republic of Ireland) Rosary Mary Walsh	(United States) Elizabeth Katherine Mitrovic	(Brazil) Maria Carolina Barón Vicentini	(Brazil) Roberta Pessoa Vieira Ribeiro	(Brazil) Roberta Pessoa Vieira Ribeiro
2024	(Italy)		(Switzerland) Scout S. S. Feitosa Pereira	(Brazil) Raquel Ferreira da Silva	(Norway) Julia Maele	(Canada) Brianna Ste-Marie	(France) Aurélie Le Vern	(Spain) Anabel Lopez Beard		(France) Aurélie Le Vern

== See also ==
- IBJJF
- World Championship
- World No-Gi Championship
- Pan Jiu-Jitsu Championship
- Pan Jiu-Jitsu No-Gi Championship
- European Open Championship
- Brazilian National Jiu-Jitsu Championship
- Brazilian Nationals Jiu-Jitsu No-Gi Championship
- Asian Open Championship
- Abu Dhabi Combat Club Submission Wrestling World Championship
