= Abu Dhabi Grand Slam Jiu-Jitsu World Tour =

Brazilian Jiu-Jitsu tournaments

- Logo of Abu Dhabi Grand Slam Season 4

Competition details
- Location: International
- Discipline: Brazilian Jiu-Jitsu
- Type: Jiu-Jitsu Championship

Divisions
- Current weight divisions: Men: Super Heavy (-120 kg); Light Heavy (-94 kg); Middle (-85 kg); Welter (-77 kg); Light (-69 kg); Feather -(-62 kg); Light (-56 kg); Women: Heavy (-95); Middle (-70 kg); Light (-62 kg); Light Feather (-55 kg); Rooster (-49 kg)

History
- First edition: 2015/2016
- Editions: 7 (2021–2022)

The Abu Dhabi Grand Slam Jiu-Jitsu World Tour commonly known as the Abu Dhabi Grand Slam (ADGS) is a series of international Brazilian jiu-jitsu tournaments (Gi and No-gi), taking place every year, organised by the United Arab Emirates Jiu-Jitsu Federation (UAEJJF) and the Abu Dhabi Jiu-Jitsu Pro (AJP) as part of the AJP competition circuit. The events take place in a number of cities around the world.

== History ==
The Abu Dhabi Grand Slam Jiu-Jitsu Tour (ADGS) was created by the United Arab Emirates Jiu-Jitsu Federation (UAEJJF) in 2015 with the goal of "developing and promoting jiu-jitsu around the world". The ADGS is part of the Abu Dhabi Jiu Jitsu Pro (AJP) Competition Circuit, which represents 78 international events in each season.

The Abu Dhabi Grand Slam features a series of high-level tournaments open to the world's elite male and female Brazilian jiu-jitsu competitors in the categories of juniors, professionals and masters with cash prizes awarded for the top athletes of each division. Those events, known as Grand Slams, take place each seasons in various host cities.

== Abu Dhabi Grand Slam 2015–2016 ==
For its first season, the UAEJJF implemented 4 grand slam tournaments in four countries (Japan, England, USA and Brazil). Black belt prize money for each Grand Slam was US$49,000 with an additional $7000 submission bonuses spread through the divisions.

Season One
Event	Venue	Date	Participants
Abu Dhabi Grand Slam Tokyo	Sumida City Gymnasium, Tokyo	29 August 2015	
Abu Dhabi Grand Slam Los Angeles	Azusa Pacific University, Los Angeles	18 October 2015	
Abu Dhabi Grand Slam Rio de Janeiro	HSBC Arena, Rio	5 – 6 December 2015	
Abu Dhabi Grand Slam London	ExCeL London	19 March 2016	

== Abu Dhabi Grand Slam 2016–2017 ==
For its second season, the Grand Slam was held in five host cities with the addition of Abu Dhabi.

Season Two
Event	Venue	Date	Participants
Abu Dhabi Grand Slam Los Angeles	Los Angeles Convention Center	3 – 4 September 2016	
Abu Dhabi Grand Slam Tokyo	Big Turtle Fukaya, Tokyo	23 October 2016	
Abu Dhabi Grand Slam Rio de Janeiro	HSBC Arena, Rio	12 – 13 November 2016	
Abu Dhabi Grand Slam Abu Dhabi	IPIC Arena	12 – 13 January 2017	
Abu Dhabi Grand Slam London	ExCeL London	18 March 2017	806 competitors from 59 countries

== Abu Dhabi Grand Slam 2017–2018 ==
For its third season, the Grand Slam included a total prize fund of more than US$800,000.

Season Three
Event	Venue	Date	Participants
Abu Dhabi Grand Slam Tokyo	Makuhari Convention Center, Tokyo	15 July 2017	
Abu Dhabi Grand Slam Los Angeles	Los Angeles Convention Center	23 – 24 September 2017	750 competitors
Abu Dhabi Grand Slam Rio de Janeiro	Carioca Arena, Rio	11 – 13 November 2017	
Abu Dhabi Grand Slam Abu Dhabi	IPIC Arena	12 – 13 January 2018	
Abu Dhabi Grand Slam London	Copper Box Arena, London	10 – 11 March 2018	

== Abu Dhabi Grand Slam 2018–2019 ==
For its fourth season combined cash prizes of more than US$800,000 were awarded to the top athletes of each division.

Season Four
Event	Venue	Date	Participants
Abu Dhabi Grand Slam Tokyo	Ota Gymnasium, Tokyo	29 July 2018	
Abu Dhabi Grand Slam Los Angeles	Los Angeles Convention Center	22 – 23 September 2018	
Abu Dhabi Grand Slam Rio de Janeiro	Carioca Arena, Rio	16 – 18 November 2018	
Abu Dhabi Grand Slam Abu Dhabi	Mubadala Arena, Abu Dhabi	10 – 12 January 2019	
Abu Dhabi Grand Slam London	Copper Box Arena, London	9 – 10 March 2019	

== Abu Dhabi Grand Slam 2019–2020 ==
For the fifth season Moscow was added as a new host city. To minimize the potential spread of the Coronavirus, the UAEJJF ran Grand Slam London as a closed event.

Season Five
Event	Venue	Date	Participants
Abu Dhabi Grand Slam Moscow	Triumph Sports Palace, Moscow	15 – 16 June 2019	
Abu Dhabi Grand Slam Tokyo	Ota Gymnasium, Tokyo	27 – 28 July 2019	700 competitors from 35 countries (Note: The Abu Dhabi Grand Slam Tokyo also included a competition category for the Para-jiu-jitsu.)
Abu Dhabi Grand Slam Los Angeles	Azusa Pacific University, Los Angeles	21 – 22 September 2019	
Abu Dhabi Grand Slam Rio de Janeiro	Carioca Arena, Rio	1 – 3 November 2019	
Abu Dhabi Grand Slam Abu Dhabi	Mubadala Arena, Abu Dhabi	16 – 18 January 2020	
Abu Dhabi Grand Slam London	Copper Box Arena, London	7 – 8 March 2020	

== Abu Dhabi Grand Slam 2020–2021 ==
A total of $1,525,000 prize money was announced available for the course of this season.

Season Six
Event	Venue	Date	Participants
Abu Dhabi Grand Slam Moscow	Crocus City Hall, Moscow	24 – 25 June 2020	
Abu Dhabi Grand Slam Los Angeles	Felix Events Center, Azusa, CA	12 – 13 September 2020	
Abu Dhabi Grand Slam Tokyo	Ota Gymnasium, Tokyo	14 – 15 November 2020	
Abu Dhabi Grand Slam Rio de Janeiro	Carioca Arena, Rio	4 – 6 December 2020	1,096 competitors
Abu Dhabi Grand Slam London	Copper Box Arena, London	6 – 7 February 2021	
Abu Dhabi Grand Slam Abu Dhabi	Jiu-Jitsu Arena, Abu Dhabi	1 – 3 April 2021	

== Abu Dhabi Grand Slam 2021–2022 ==
For its seventh season three new locations were added, Miami, Beijing and Sidney. The season will span across five continents and seven different cities. A total of $1,575,000 prize money was announced available for the course of the season.

Season Seven
Event	Venue	Date	Participants
Abu Dhabi Grand Slam Miami	Miami Airport Convention Center	8 August 2021	
Abu Dhabi Grand Slam Moscow	Sambo-70 school, Moscow	12 September 2021	
Abu Dhabi Grand Slam Rio de Janeiro	Rio Olympic Velodrome	22 – 24 October 2021	
Abu Dhabi Grand Slam Beijing	Beijing, China	12 December 2021	
Abu Dhabi Grand Slam Sidney	Sydney, Australia	20 February 2022	
Abu Dhabi Grand Slam London	Copper Box Arena, London	20 March 2022	
Abu Dhabi Grand Slam Abu Dhabi	Jiu-Jitsu Arena, Abu Dhabi	6 – 8 May 2022	

== Abu Dhabi Grand Slam 2022–2023 ==
A total of $1,525,000 prize money was announced available for the course of the season.

Season Eight
Event	Venue	Date	Participants
Abu Dhabi Grand Slam Rio de Janeiro	Arena Carioca 1, Rio	31 July 2022	
Abu Dhabi Grand Slam Miami	Watsco Center, Miami	28 August 2022	
Abu Dhabi Grand Slam Tokyo	TBA	TBA	
Abu Dhabi Grand Slam Shanghai	TBA	TBA	
Abu Dhabi Grand Slam Sydney	State Sports Centre, Sydney	05 February 2023	
Abu Dhabi Grand Slam London	Copper Box Arena, London	12 March 2023	
Abu Dhabi Grand Slam Abu Dhabi	Mubadala Arena, Abu Dhabi, UAE	07 May 2023	

== Abu Dhabi Grand Slam 2023–2024 ==
A total of $1,525,000 prize money was announced available for the course of the season.

Season Nine
Event	Venue	Date	Participants
Abu Dhabi Grand Slam Rio de Janeiro	Arena Carioca 1, Rio	10-11 June 2023	
Abu Dhabi Grand Slam Miami	Watsco Center, Miami	17 September 2023	
Abu Dhabi Grand Slam Tokyo	Ota City General Gymnasium, Tokyo	14 January 2024	
Abu Dhabi Grand Slam Shanghai	TBA	TBA	
Abu Dhabi Grand Slam Sydney	TBA	TBA	
Abu Dhabi Grand Slam Rome	Centro Olimpico Matteo Pellicone, Rome	14 April 2024	
Abu Dhabi Grand Slam Abu Dhabi	Mubadala Arena, Abu Dhabi, UAE	12 May 2024	

== Abu Dhabi Grand Slam 2024–2025 ==
A total of $1,525,000 prize money was announced available for the course of the season.

Season Nine
Event	Venue	Date	Participants
Abu Dhabi Grand Slam Rio de Janeiro	Arena Carioca 1, Rio	21 July 2024	
Abu Dhabi Grand Slam Dallas	Curtis Culwell Center, Dallas	29 September 2024	
Abu Dhabi Grand Slam Tokyo	TBA	TBA	
Abu Dhabi Grand Slam Xi'an	Xi'an Olympic Sports Center, Xi'an	20 October 2024	
Abu Dhabi Grand Slam Sydney	TBA	TBA	
Abu Dhabi Grand Slam London	Copper Box Arena, London	13 April 2025	
Abu Dhabi Grand Slam Rome	Centro Olimpico Matteo Pellicone, Rome	23 February 2025	
Abu Dhabi Grand Slam Istanbul	Basaksehir Genclik ve Spor Ilce Mudurlugu Tesisleri, Istanbul	09 June 2024	
Abu Dhabi Grand Slam Moscow	Sport Academy Dinamo, Moscow	01 September 2024	
Abu Dhabi Grand Slam Abu Dhabi	Mubadala Arena, Abu Dhabi, UAE	11 May 2025	

== See also ==
- UAEJJF weight classes
- Abu Dhabi World Professional Jiu-Jitsu Championship
- ADCC Submission Fighting World Championship
