= 2021 World Jiu-Jitsu Championship =

Brazilian Jiu-Jitsu international tournament

- Venue: Anaheim Convention Center
- Location: (United States) Anaheim, California
- Dates: 9-12 December 2021
- Website: IBJJF

The 2021 World Jiu-Jitsu Championship or World 2021 IBJJF Jiu-Jitsu Championship was an international jiu-jitsu event organised by the International Brazilian Jiu-Jitsu Federation (IBJFF) and held at the Anaheim Convention Center in Anaheim, California, from 9-12 December 2021. This 25th edition of the most prestigious Brazilian jiu-jitsu tournament was the first one to take place following the COVID-19 pandemic and the cancellation of the 2020 season, it saw the emergence of a brand new generation of world champions.

== Background ==
The 2021 IBJJF World Jiu-Jitsu Championship was the first season of the World Jiu-Jitsu Championship, the most prestigious event in the sport, to take place following the 2019 IBJJF World edition. The previous 2020 edition was cancelled by the organising International Brazilian Jiu-Jitsu Federation as a consequence of the COVID-19 pandemic.

This 25th edition took place for the first time at the Anaheim Convention Center in Anaheim, California instead of the Walter Pyramid in Long Beach where it had been held since 2007 after moving from Brazil to the United States. This edition also took place for the first time at the end of the year instead of the beginning of the year like previous edition, giving more time for athletes to be able to participate. The black belts competition took place towards the end, on 11 December and 12 December (two days); the elimination round and the open class / absolute division matches took place on the first day, Saturday 11 December followed by the quarterfinals all the way to the finals on Sunday 12 December, the last day of the tournament.

This Championship saw Checkmat winning its first world team title, Dream Art competing for its first year as a team and a new generation of black belts winning their first gold medals, such as Tainan Dalpra who was the first black belt to represent Art Of Jiu Jitsu (AOJ) at the IBJJF World final.

== Men's division ==
In the roosterweight division, Mikey Musumeci became world champion for the fourth time in a row, the first American to do so at black belt, representing his new team, Pedigo Submission Fighting for the first time, after beating ten time world champion Bruno Malfacine by points. In the ultra heavy division semifinal Nicholas Meregali was disqualified from the tournament, after winning his match, for giving the finger to a heckler in the audience.

=== Men's medallists ===
Adult male black belt results

Division	Gold	Silver	Bronze
Rooster (57.5 kg)	(United States) Mikey Musumeci; Pedigo Submission Fighting	(Brazil) Bruno Malfacine; Alliance	(Brazil) Jonas Andrade; PSLPB Cicero Costha USA
Rooster (57.5 kg)	(United States) Mikey Musumeci; Pedigo Submission Fighting	(Brazil) Bruno Malfacine; Alliance	(Brazil) Rodnei Barbosa; Qatar BJJ Brasil
Light-feather (64 kg)	(Brazil) Diego Oliveira Batista; PSLPB Cicero Costha USA	(United States) Malachi Edmond; Team Lloyd Irvin	(Brazil) Meyram Maquiné; Dream Art
Light-feather (64 kg)	(Brazil) Diego Oliveira Batista; PSLPB Cicero Costha USA	(United States) Malachi Edmond; Team Lloyd Irvin	(United States) Rene Eduardo Lopez; Jiu-Jitsu Methods
Feather (70 kg)	(Brazil) Fabricio Andrey; Fight Sports	(United States) Shane Hill-Taylor; Team Lloyd Irvin	(Brazil) Alex Sodré; Nova União
Feather (70 kg)	(Brazil) Fabricio Andrey; Fight Sports	(United States) Shane Hill-Taylor; Team Lloyd Irvin	(Brazil) Diego Sodre; Nova União
Light (76 kg)	(Brazil) Renato Canuto; CheckMat	(Brazil) Matheus Gabriel; CheckMat	(Brazil) Lucas Valente; Gracie Barra
Light (76 kg)	(Brazil) Renato Canuto; CheckMat	(Brazil) Matheus Gabriel; CheckMat	(Brazil) Murilo Amaral; Alliance
Middle (82.3 kg)	(Brazil) Tainan Dalpra; Art of Jiu Jitsu	(Brazil) Isaque Bahiense; Dream Art	(Brazil) Jonnatas Gracie; Atos Jiu-Jitsu
Middle (82.3 kg)	(Brazil) Tainan Dalpra; Art of Jiu Jitsu	(Brazil) Isaque Bahiense; Dream Art	(Norway) Tommy Langaker; Nova União
Medium-Heavy (88.3 kg)	(Brazil) Gustavo Batista; Atos Jiu-Jitsu	(Brazil) Lucas Barbosa; Atos Jiu-Jitsu	(Brazil) André Porfirio; Fight Sports
Medium-Heavy (88.3 kg)	(Brazil) Gustavo Batista; Atos Jiu-Jitsu	(Brazil) Lucas Barbosa; Atos Jiu-Jitsu	(Brazil) Leandro Lo; Unity Jiu Jitsu
Heavy (94.3 kg)	(Brazil) Kaynan Duarte; Atos Jiu-Jitsu	(Brazil) Luan Azeved; PSLPB Cicero Costha USA	(Brazil) Dimitrius Souza; Alliance
Heavy (94.3 kg)	(Brazil) Kaynan Duarte; Atos Jiu-Jitsu	(Brazil) Luan Azeved; PSLPB Cicero Costha USA	(Brazil) Gabriel Oliveira; Alliance
Super-Heavy (100.5 kg)	(Brazil) Erich Munis; Dream Art	(Brazil) Fellipe Andrew; Alliance	(United States) Devhonte Johnson; Unity Jiu Jitsu
Super-Heavy (100.5 kg)	(Brazil) Erich Munis; Dream Art	(Brazil) Fellipe Andrew; Alliance	(Brazil) Felipe Pena; Gracie Barra
Ultra-Heavy (over 100.5 kg)	(Brazil) Victor Hugo Marques; Six Blades Jiu-Jitsu	(Brazil) Max Gimenis; GFTeam	
Ultra-Heavy (over 100.5 kg)	(Brazil) Victor Hugo Marques; Six Blades Jiu-Jitsu	(Brazil) Max Gimenis; GFTeam	(Brazil) Igor Schneider; Dream Art
Open Class (any weight divisions)	(Brazil) Felipe Pena; Gracie Barra	(Brazil) Fellipe Andrew; Alliance	
Open Class (any weight divisions)	(Brazil) Felipe Pena; Gracie Barra	(Brazil) Fellipe Andrew; Alliance	(Brazil) Kaynan Duarte; Atos Jiu-Jitsu

== Women's division ==
After one of the longest career in the sport and 13 years since receiving her black belt from Fabio Gurgel, "the queen of the heaviest weightclass" Gabi Garcia, after getting submitted for the first time in over 10 years, announced her retirement from gi competition to concentrate on her MMA career. Bia Mesquita won her 7th world title after defeating Luiza Monteiro by points while Gabrieli Pessanha won double gold.

=== Women's medallists ===
Adult female black belt results

Division	Gold	Silver	Bronze
Rooster (48.5 kg)	(Brazil) Mayssa Bastos; GFTeam	(Brazil) Jessica Dantas; Unique Logic Jiu-Jitsu HQ	(Brazil) Brenda Larissa; Fight Sports
Rooster (48.5 kg)	(Brazil) Mayssa Bastos; GFTeam	(Brazil) Jessica Dantas; Unique Logic Jiu-Jitsu HQ	(Italy) Serena Gabrielli; Flow
Light-feather (53.5 kg)	(Brazil) Ana Rodrigues; Dream Art	(United States) Tammi Musumeci; Pedigo Submission Fighting	(United States) Jessa Khan; Art of Jiu Jitsu
Light-feather (53.5 kg)	(Brazil) Ana Rodrigues; Dream Art	(United States) Tammi Musumeci; Pedigo Submission Fighting	(Netherlands) Rose-Marie El Sharouni; CheckMat
Feather (58.5 kg)	(Brazil) Gabrielle McComb; Atos Jiu-Jitsu	(Brazil) Bianca Basílio; Atos Jiu-Jitsu	(Brazil) Gabriela Fechter; CheckMat
Feather (58.5 kg)	(Brazil) Gabrielle McComb; Atos Jiu-Jitsu	(Brazil) Bianca Basílio; Atos Jiu-Jitsu	(Brazil) Larissa Campos; Gracie Humaita
Light (64 kg)	(Brazil) Bia Mesquita; Gracie Humaita	(Brazil) Luiza Monteiro; Atos Jiu-Jitsu	(Italy) Margot Ciccarelli; Unity Jiu Jitsu
Light (64 kg)	(Brazil) Bia Mesquita; Gracie Humaita	(Brazil) Luiza Monteiro; Atos Jiu-Jitsu	(United States) Nathalie Ribeiro; CheckMat
Middle (69 kg)	(Brazil) Andressa Cintra; Gracie Barra	(Brazil) Thamara Ferreira; Guigo JJ	(United States) Claire North; TAC Team BJJ
Middle (69 kg)	(Brazil) Andressa Cintra; Gracie Barra	(Brazil) Thamara Ferreira; Guigo JJ	(United States) Raquel Pa’aluhi Canuto; CheckMat
Medium-Heavy (74 kg)	(Brazil) Ana Carolina Vieira; Aviv Jiu-Jitsu	(United States) Elisabeth Clay; Ares BJJ	(United States) Chloé McNally; Unity Jiu Jitsu
Medium-Heavy (74 kg)	(Brazil) Ana Carolina Vieira; Aviv Jiu-Jitsu	(United States) Elisabeth Clay; Ares BJJ	(Japan) Fernanda Yukari Makiyama Cristo; Evox BJJ
Heavy (79.3 kg)	(Brazil) Melissa Cueto; Alliance	(Brazil) Izadora Cristina Silva; Dream Art	(United States) Maggie Grindatti; Fight Sports
Heavy (79.3 kg)	(Brazil) Melissa Cueto; Alliance	(Brazil) Izadora Cristina Silva; Dream Art	(Poland) Maria Malyjasiak; Abmar Barbosa Association
Super-Heavy (over 79.3 kg)	(Brazil) Gabrieli Pessanha; Infight JJ	(Brazil) Yara Soares; Dream Art	(Brazil) Gabi Garcia; Alliance
Super-Heavy (over 79.3 kg)	(Brazil) Gabrieli Pessanha; Infight JJ	(Brazil) Yara Soares; Dream Art	(Brazil) Mayara Custódio; CheckMat
Open Class (any weight divisions)	(Brazil) Gabrieli Pessanha; Infight JJ	(Brazil) Yara Soares; Dream Art	(Brazil) Bia Mesquita; Gracie Humaita
Open Class (any weight divisions)	(Brazil) Gabrieli Pessanha; Infight JJ	(Brazil) Yara Soares; Dream Art	(Brazil) Gabi Garcia; Alliance

== Teams results ==
For this season Checkmat brought 102 competitors, Gracie Barra counted 87, Grappling Fight Team known as GFTeam 48, Unity Jiu Jitsu 46, and Art of Jiu-Jitsu who had just separated in early 2020 from Atos 29 athletes.

Rank	Men's division	
Rank	Team	Points
1	Checkmat	62
2	Alliance	52
3	Atos Jiu-Jitsu	47
4	Gracie Barra	35
5	R1NG BJJ	32
6	Unity Jiu Jitsu	27
7	Art of Jiu Jitsu	23
8	Nova União	22
9	Renzo Gracie Academy	21
10	GFTeam	19

Rank	Women's division	
Rank	Team	Points
1	GFTeam	63
2	Dream Art	49
3	CheckMat	39
4	Infight JJ	27
5	Atos Jiu-Jitsu	27
6	Unity Jiu Jitsu	26
7	Gracie Barra	24
8	Alliance	24
9	Art of Jiu Jitsu	21
10	Zenith BJJ – Las Vegas	18

== See also ==
- World IBJJF Jiu-Jitsu Championship
- European IBJJF Jiu-Jitsu Championship
- Pan IBJJF Jiu-Jitsu Championship
