= 2020 Brazilian Jiu-Jitsu European Championship =

Brazilian jiu-jitsu competition

- Location: Lisbon, Portugal
- Dates: 29–26 January 2020

The 2020 Brazilian Jiu-Jitsu European Championship, officially called the 2020 European Jiu-Jitsu IBJFF Championship, was an international jiu-jitsu event organised by the International Brazilian Jiu-Jitsu Federation (IBJFF) held between 20 and 26 January 2020 in Lisbon, Portugal.

== Men's medallists ==
Adult male black belt results

Division	Gold	Silver	Bronze
Rooster (57.5 kg)	(Japan) Tomoyuki Hashimoto; Brasa CTA	(Brazil) Thalison Soares; Cicero Costha Internacional	(Brazil) Cleber Sousa; Atos Jiu-Jitsu
Rooster (57.5 kg)	(Japan) Tomoyuki Hashimoto; Brasa CTA	(Brazil) Thalison Soares; Cicero Costha Internacional	(Japan) Koji Shibamoto; Tri-Force Jiu-Jitsu Academy
Light-feather (64 kg)	(United States) Michael Musumeci Jr. Brasa CTA	(Brazil) Jonas Andrade; Cicero Costha Internacional	(Brazil) Carlos Silva; GFTeam
Light-feather (64 kg)	(United States) Michael Musumeci Jr. Brasa CTA	(Brazil) Jonas Andrade; Cicero Costha Internacional	(Brazil) Diego Oliveira; Cicero Costha Internacional
Feather (70 kg)	(United States) Isaac Doederlein; Alliance	(Brazil) Leonardo Saggioro; Brazilian Top Team	(Brazil) Alexssandro Sodré; Nova União
Feather (70 kg)	(United States) Isaac Doederlein; Alliance	(Brazil) Leonardo Saggioro; Brazilian Top Team	(Brazil) Gabriel Sousa; ZR Team Association
Light (76 kg)	(Brazil) Jonnatas Gracie; Atos Jiu-Jitsu	(Brazil) Vitor Henrique Oliveira; GFTeam	(Brazil) Luan Carvalho; Nova União
Light (76 kg)	(Brazil) Jonnatas Gracie; Atos Jiu-Jitsu	(Brazil) Vitor Henrique Oliveira; GFTeam	(Brazil) Pedro Veras; Cicero Costha Internacional
Middleweight (82.3 kg)	(Norway) Tommy Langaker; KMR BJJ Kimura	(Portugal) Pedro Ramalho; Focus Jiu-Jitsu	(Brazil) Alexandre de Jesus; Atos Jiu-Jitsu
Middleweight (82.3 kg)	(Norway) Tommy Langaker; KMR BJJ Kimura	(Portugal) Pedro Ramalho; Focus Jiu-Jitsu	(Brazil) Ronaldo Júnior; Atos Jiu-Jitsu
Medium-heavyweight (88.3 kg)	(Portugal) Manuel Ribamar; Rodrigo Pinheiro BJJ	(Portugal) Bruno Lima; AMA Jiu-Jitsu Team	(Poland) Jakub Zajkowski; Gracie Barra
Medium-heavyweight (88.3 kg)	(Portugal) Manuel Ribamar; Rodrigo Pinheiro BJJ	(Portugal) Bruno Lima; AMA Jiu-Jitsu Team	(Finland) Santeri Lilius; Gracie Barra
Heavyweight (94.3 kg)	(United States) Keenan Cornelius; Legion American Jiu-Jitsu	(Poland) Adam Wardzinski; CheckMat	(France) Dimitrius Souza; Alliance
Heavyweight (94.3 kg)	(United States) Keenan Cornelius; Legion American Jiu-Jitsu	(Poland) Adam Wardzinski; CheckMat	(Brazil) Jackson Sousa; CheckMat
Super-heavyweight (100.5 kg)	(Brazil) Patrick Gaudio; GFTeam	(Brazil) Fellipe Andrew; Zenith BJJ	(Brazil) Fellipe Trovo; Gracie Barra
Super-heavyweight (100.5 kg)	(Brazil) Patrick Gaudio; GFTeam	(Brazil) Fellipe Andrew; Zenith BJJ	(Poland) Gerard Labinski; NS Brotherhood International
Ultra-heavyweight (No Limit)	(Brazil) Igor Schneider; Ns Brotherhood	(France) Seif-Eddine Houmine; Team Lloyd Irvin	(Brazil) Mahamed Aly; Icon Jiu-Jitsu Team
Ultra-heavyweight (No Limit)	(Brazil) Igor Schneider; Ns Brotherhood	(France) Seif-Eddine Houmine; Team Lloyd Irvin	(United States) Tanner Rice; Double Five
Absolute (Open Class)	(Brazil) Fellipe Andrew; Zenith BJJ	(Brazil) Keenan Cornelius; Legion American Jiu-Jitsu	(Brazil) Fellipe Trovo; Gracie Barra
Absolute (Open Class)	(Brazil) Fellipe Andrew; Zenith BJJ	(Brazil) Keenan Cornelius; Legion American Jiu-Jitsu	(Brazil) Mahamed Aly; Team Lloyd Irvin

== Women's medallists ==
Adult female black belt results

Division	Gold	Silver	Bronze
Rooster (48.5 kg)	(Brazil) Mayssa Bastos; GFTeam	(Brazil) Serena Gabrielli; Flow	
Rooster (48.5 kg)	(Brazil) Mayssa Bastos; GFTeam	(Brazil) Serena Gabrielli; Flow	n/a
Light-feather (53.5 kg)	(Brazil) Ana Rodrigues; Alliance	(Brazil) Talita Alencar; Alliance	(Spain) Naiomi Matthews; Team Ganbaru
Light-feather (53.5 kg)	(Brazil) Ana Rodrigues; Alliance	(Brazil) Talita Alencar; Alliance	(Netherlands) Rose-Marie El Sharouni; CheckMat
Feather (58.5 kg)	(Brazil) Amal Amjahid; PAT Academy Belgium	(Brazil) Larissa Campos; Gracie Humaita	(Brazil) Bianca Basílio; Atos Jiu-Jitsu
Feather (58.5 kg)	(Brazil) Amal Amjahid; PAT Academy Belgium	(Brazil) Larissa Campos; Gracie Humaita	(Brazil) Gabriela Fechter; CheckMat
Light (64 kg)	(Wales) Ffion Davies; ECJJA	(Germany) Charlotte von Baumgarten; Mathias Ribeiro Team	(Brazil) Nathalie Ribeiro; CheckMat International
Light (64 kg)	(Wales) Ffion Davies; ECJJA	(Germany) Charlotte von Baumgarten; Mathias Ribeiro Team	(United States) Nicole Sullivan; Atos Jiu-Jitsu
Middleweight (69 kg)	(Brazil) Thamara Ferreira; Cicero Costha Internacional	(United States) Danielle Alvarez; LEAD BJJ	(Germany) Hannah Rauch; Gracie Humaita
Middleweight (69 kg)	(Brazil) Thamara Ferreira; Cicero Costha Internacional	(United States) Danielle Alvarez; LEAD BJJ	(Norway) Julia Maele; OXY
Medium-heavyweight (74 kg)	(Brazil) Sábatha Laís; Ryan Gracie Team	(United States) Maggie Grindatti; Fight Sports International	
Medium-heavyweight (74 kg)	(Brazil) Sábatha Laís; Ryan Gracie Team	(United States) Maggie Grindatti; Fight Sports International	(Brazil) Maria Eduarda Vieira; Brazilian Power Team
Heavyweight (80 kg)	(England) Laura Barker; Gracie Barra	(Poland) Magdalena Loska; Brasa CTA	Claire-France Thevenon; Mako Team Paris
Heavyweight (80 kg)	(England) Laura Barker; Gracie Barra	(Poland) Magdalena Loska; Brasa CTA	(Brazil) Patrícia Santos; Double Five
Super-heavyweight (No Limit)	(Brazil) Jessica Flowers; Gracie Barra	(United States) Kendall Reusing; Gracie Barra	
Super-heavyweight (No Limit)	(Brazil) Jessica Flowers; Gracie Barra	(United States) Kendall Reusing; Gracie Barra	(Finland) Venla Luukkonen; Hilti Akademi Nord
Absolute (Open Class)	(Wales) Ffion Davies; ECJJA	(Brazil) Jessica Flowers; Gracie Barra	(Brazil) Larissa Campos; Gracie Humaita
Absolute (Open Class)	(Wales) Ffion Davies; ECJJA	(Brazil) Jessica Flowers; Gracie Barra	(United States) Vedha Toscano; CheckMat

== Teams results ==
Results by Academy

Rank	Men's division	
Rank	Team	Points
1	Alliance	111
2	Qatar BJJ Brasil	52
3	GFTeam	47
4	Atos Jiu-Jitsu	38
5	Cicero Costha Internacional	30
6	Brasa CTA	24
7	Frontline Academy	22
8	CheckMat	20
9	ZR Team Association	16
10	Nova União	13

Rank	Women's division	
Rank	Team	Points
1	CheckMat (Note: Checkmat’s 5th Adult Female European title.)	51
2	Alliance	34
3	Gracie Barra	33
4	Atos Jiu-Jitsu	30
5	ECJJA	22
6	Nova União	22
7	Brazilian Power Team	19
8	ZR Team Association	19
9	Brasa CTA	15
10	GFTeam	13

== See also ==
- European IBJJF Jiu-Jitsu Championship
- World IBJJF Jiu-Jitsu Championship
- Pan IBJJF Jiu-Jitsu Championship
- Asian IBJJF Jiu-Jitsu Championship
