= Jackson Sousa =

Brazilian practitioner of Brazilian jiu-jitsu

- Born: January 24, 1990 (age 36); Rio de Janeiro, Brazil
- Other names: Jackzinho
- Height: 1.90 m (6 ft 3 in)
- Weight: 94 kg (207 lb; 14 st 11 lb)
- Division: Heavyweight
- Style: Brazilian Jiu Jitsu
- Team: Cantagalo Jiu Jitsu; Checkmat
- Rank: 3rd deg. BJJ black belt (under Ricardo Vieira)

Jackson Sousa dos Santos (born January 24, 1990) is a Brazilian jiu-jitsu (BJJ) and grappling competitor and instructor. A winner of several major championships in coloured belts, such as IBJJF World Championship, IBJJF European Championship and CBJJ Brazilian Nationals; Sousa is a black belt World No-Gi champion, a 2 x European champion (in Gi and No-Gi) and a 3 x Pan No-Gi champion.

A BJJ black belt under Ricardo Vieira, Sousa has competed at international grappling events, including Absolute Championship Berkut, Polaris Pro Grappling and Metamoris. Souza was considered in 2017 one of CheckMat's most prolific competitors.

== Early life ==
Jackson Sousa dos Santos was born on 24 January 1990 in Rio de Janeiro, Brazil. Sousa started training Brazilian Jiu-Jitsu at the age of ten under Leandro Martins who was part of the team founded by Fernando "Terere" Augusto. At the age of 16, he joined the CheckMat team, founded by the brothers Ricardo Vieira, Léo Vieira and Leandro Vieira and headquartered in São Paulo, Brazil. Sousa gave his international debut at the European Championships in 2011 and since then has been competing at an international level. In 2011, he won the South American Jiu-Jitsu Championship and the Brazilian National No-Gi Championship.

At brown belt level, Sousa won the 2012 IBJJF European Championship in Lisbon, Portugal. He also won five more gold medals at the IBJJF Brazilian National Jiu-Jitsu Championship, IBJJF Brazilian National No-Gi Championship and CBJJE World Championship.

In December 2012, a super fight between Sousa and Keenan Cornelius, was cancelled after Sousa was denied his visa for the US. Sousa's first appearance in an American competition happened in 2013 when his US visa application was approved after four unsuccessful attempts in 2010, 2011 and 2012. At the 2013 IBJJF World Championship Sousa won gold in the heavyweight division and bronze in the absolute division after losing in the semi-final to Keenan Cornelius in what constituted one of the most awaited fights between two star brown belt athletes that year.

== Black belt career ==
Sousa was awarded his black belt by his master Ricardo Vieira in October 2013 and won the IBJJF World No-Gi Championship.

In 2014, Sousa won the IBJJF European Championship in Lisbon, the IBJJF Pan No-Gi Championship in New York and won silver at the IBJJF World No-Gi Championship. Sousa won several other international tournaments, including the Dallas International Open, Las Vegas Spring International Open, and Rome International Open.

In 2015, Sousa won bronze at the IBJJF World Championship, silver at the IBJJF World No-Gi Championship, and silver at the UAEJJF Abu Dhabi World Professional Jiu-Jitsu Championships. He won several European tournaments, including the IBJJF European No-Gi Championship, Berlin International Open, Berlin International Open No-Gi, and Rome International Open.

In 2016, Sousa won the IBJJF European Championship for the second time as a black belt and for the fourth time overall. Sousa lost by referee decision against André Luis Leite Galvão at the IBJJF World Championship and took home silver. In late 2016 and early 2017, Sousa was absent from the international competition scene while remaining in the United Kingdom to obtain residency status, however he competed at the British Nationals and British Nationals No-Gi.

In May 2017, Sousa returned to the international competition scene, winning bronze at the 2017 IBJJF World No-Gi Championship, and double gold at the IBJJF Pan American No-Gi Championship. Sousa won a further seven gold medals and two silver medals at international tournaments in Moscow, Paris and London. In September 2017, Sousa was a last-minute addition to the invitation-only ADCC world championships, replacing Checkmat teammate Luiz Panza at the -99 kg division. At the ADCC tournament, Sousa won a bronze medal after defeating Rafael Lovato by decision and losing 3–0 to Yuri Simoes in the semi-finals.

=== 2023 ===
Sousa won gold medals at heavyweight and in the absolute division of the IBJJF Dublin Open 2023 on April 1, 2023. He then won another two gold medals at Master 1 heavyweight and absolute at the IBJJF Master International - Europe 2023 on April 9, 2023. Sousa won gold medals at heavyweight and in the absolute division of the IBJJF Paris Spring Open 2023 on May 13, 2023. Sousa won a gold medal at heavyweight and a silver medal in the absolute division of the IBJJF London Fall Open 2023 on October 15, 2023.

Sousa's training partners include several notable fighters, including Marcus Almeida, João Assis, Lucas Leite, Michelle Nicolini and Leandro Vieira.

=== 2024 ===
Sousa then won a silver medal in the light-heavyweight division of the Abu Dhabi Grand Slam - Dallas on September 29, 2024.

Sousa is due to compete against Pedro Machado at ADXC 6 on October 25, 2024. He lost the match by unanimous decision.

== Sexual misconduct allegations ==
In August 2021, Checkmat black belt and elite competitor Samantha Cook reported on her Instagram that Sousa had sexually harassed her which prompted more women to come forward and share their own allegations of sexual misconduct and intimidation against him. It was also reported that accusations of sexual harassment had already been made against Sousa in 2018 in Germany.

As a result of the allegations made against him, Sousa was dropped by his sponsor Shoyoroll and suspended from his team by the head of Checkmat Léo Vieira. In November 2021, Sousa contacted the website BJJ Eastern Europe to report that he had been found not guilty by an Independent Safeguarding Review Committee commissioned in London. The announcement of Sousa's return to competition caused some members of the BJJ community to complain that no victims had been contacted during the investigation and that the Independent Commission's report had not been made public despite multiple requests.

In November 2022 Sousa's lawyer announced that his client had also been cleared of all allegations by the UKBJJA, the governing body for Brazilian jiu-jitsu in the UK, "following a lengthy and thorough investigation by a specialist investigator".
