= Jansen Gomes =

Brazilian jiu-jitsu practitioner from Brazil (born 2001)

- Born: Jansen Gomes Ramos; 20 October 2001 (age 24); Rio de Janeiro, Brazil
- Other names: Nenego
- Division: Middleweight −82 kg
- Team: Checkmat
- Rank: BJJ black belt (Note: Under his father, Antônio Carlos "Bode" and Léo Vieira)

Jansen Gomes is a Brazilian jiu-jitsu black belt athlete. Gomes is an IBJJF World Champion at every colored belt level and the middleweight black belt 2023 World Champion.

== Biography ==
Gomes was born on October 20, 2001, in Rio de Janeiro, Brazil. He grew up in Cantagalo, a neighboring community of Cantagalo–Pavão–Pavãozinho, a group of favelas in the South Zone of Rio de Janeiro, renowned for producing numerous jiu-jitsu champions. From a young age, Jansen began training Brazilian jiu-jitsu under the influence of his brother, Jonata Gomes, and his father, Antônio Carlos "Bode," who holds a black belt in BJJ.

Gomes achieved recognition as one of the top young athletes in Brazil when he was just a yellow belt, winning his first National title. Coached by his father and multiple-time world champion Ricardo "Rico" Vieira, he quickly became a prominent figure in Rico's social project in Cantagalo, and at the team's headquarters in Copacabana.

As a purple belt, Jansen started competing on the IBJJF circuit in the United States. During his time he started to train under Checkmat's Leo Vieira and Lucas Leite. In 2021 he won the middleweight and the open weight division of the 2021 Pans taking place in Orlando, Florida. In December 2021 Jansen was promoted to black belt by his father while standing on the No. 1 podium spot at the World Championships.

== Black belt career ==
=== 2023 ===
At the 2023 World Jiu-Jitsu Championship, Gomes defeated Tainan Dalpra by way of tiebreaking advantages, 0x0, 2–0, in the final of the middleweight division. Dalpra's loss to Gomes was his first loss at black belt.

Gomes was invited to compete in a superfight against Gustavo Batista at BJJ Stars 11 on September 9, 2023. He won the match 2-0 on points.

=== 2024 ===
Gomes was invited to compete against Bruno Lima at ADXC 3 on March 2, 2024. He won the match by decision.

Gomes won silver medals in the medium-heavyweight and absolute divisions at the IBJJF World Championship 2024 on June 1, 2024.

Gomes competed against Uanderson Ferreira in the main event of ADXC 6 on October 25, 2024. He won the match by unanimous decision.

Gomes challenged Fellipe Andrew for the medium-heavyweight title in the main event of BJJ Stars 14 on December 7, 2024. He won the match on points.
