= 2022 Brazilian Jiu-Jitsu European Championship =

Brazilian jiu-jitsu competition

- Venue: PalaPellicone
- Location: Rome, Italy
- Dates: 15–20 February 2022
- Competitors: 3391 from 71 nations
- Website: IBJJF

The 2022 Brazilian Jiu-Jitsu European Championship, officially called the 2022 European Jiu-Jitsu IBJFF Championship, was an international jiu-jitsu event organised by the International Brazilian Jiu-Jitsu Federation (IBJFF) held between 15 and 20 February 2022 in Rome, Italy.

== Location ==
Rome was selected as the host city for the first time as the European championship had been previously held, until 2019, (Note: No European championship took place in 2021 due to the COVID-19 pandemic.) in Lisbon, Portugal.

== Men's medallists ==
Adult male black belt results

Division	Gold	Silver	Bronze
Rooster (57.5 kg)	(Brazil) Thalison Soares; Cicero Costha International	(Brazil) Welerson Silva; Nova União	(Brazil) Yuri Hendrex; PSLPB Cicero Costha
Rooster (57.5 kg)	(Brazil) Thalison Soares; Cicero Costha International	(Brazil) Welerson Silva; Nova União	(Brazil) Jonas Andrade; Cicero Costha Internacional
Light-feather (64 kg)	(Brazil) Hiago George; Cicero Costha Internacional	(Brazil) Paulo Miyao; Cicero Costha Internacional	(Brazil) Huthayfah Penney; Carlson Gracie Team
Light-feather (64 kg)	(Brazil) Hiago George; Cicero Costha Internacional	(Brazil) Paulo Miyao; Cicero Costha Internacional	(Brazil) Igor Terreco; Grand Union Jiu-Jitsu
Feather (70 kg)	(Brazil) Diego Sodré; Nova União	(United States) Isaac Doederlein; Alliance Jiu Jitsu	(Brazil) Wilhiam Mateus Marques; ZR Team Association
Feather (70 kg)	(Brazil) Diego Sodré; Nova União	(United States) Isaac Doederlein; Alliance Jiu Jitsu	(Republic of Ireland) Sam McNally; ECJJA
Light (76 kg)	(Norway) Espen Mathiesen; KMR BJJ Kimura	(Brazil) Marcelo Fausto; CheckMat	(Brazil) Marcio André; Nova União
Light (76 kg)	(Norway) Espen Mathiesen; KMR BJJ Kimura	(Brazil) Marcelo Fausto; CheckMat	(Brazil) Igor Feliz; R1NG BJJ
Middleweight (82.3 kg)	(Brazil) Tainan Dalpra; Art of Jiu Jitsu	(Norway) Tommy Langaker; KMR BJJ Kimura	(Norway) Tarik Hopstock; Frontline Academy
Middleweight (82.3 kg)	(Brazil) Tainan Dalpra; Art of Jiu Jitsu	(Norway) Tommy Langaker; KMR BJJ Kimura	(Italy) Fabio Pititto; Budo Clan
Medium-heavyweight (88.3 kg)	(Portugal) Bruno Lima; AMA Jiu-Jitsu Team	(Hungary) Szilard Sule; ZR Team Association	(United Kingdom) Sean Coates; Gracie Barra
Medium-heavyweight (88.3 kg)	(Portugal) Bruno Lima; AMA Jiu-Jitsu Team	(Hungary) Szilard Sule; ZR Team Association	(Brazil) Matheus Spirandeli; Alliance Jiu Jitsu
Heavyweight (94.3 kg)	(Poland) Adam Wardzinski; Checkmat	(Brazil) Dominique Bell; Atos Jiu-Jitsu	(France) Reda Hamed Mebtouche; Carpe Diem
Heavyweight (94.3 kg)	(Poland) Adam Wardzinski; Checkmat	(Brazil) Dominique Bell; Atos Jiu-Jitsu	(Poland) Jakub Zajkowski; Gracie Barra
Super-heavyweight (100.5 kg)	(Brazil) Fellipe Andrew; Alliance Jiu Jitsu	(Brazil) Vinícius Ferreira Gazola; Alliance Jiu Jitsu	(France) Ezequiel Esteves Nogueira; PS Phoenix BJJ International
Super-heavyweight (100.5 kg)	(Brazil) Fellipe Andrew; Alliance Jiu Jitsu	(Brazil) Vinícius Ferreira Gazola; Alliance Jiu Jitsu	(Germany) Eric Bergmann; Gracie Barra
Ultra-heavyweight (No Limit)	(Brazil) Rafael Lovato Jr. Six Blades Jiu-Jitsu	(Brazil) Guilherme Bacha; CheckMat	(Brazil) Felipe Figueiredo Maurício; Icon Jiu-Jitsu Team
Ultra-heavyweight (No Limit)	(Brazil) Rafael Lovato Jr. Six Blades Jiu-Jitsu	(Brazil) Guilherme Bacha; CheckMat	(Brazil) Yatan Bueno; Dream Art
Absolute (Open Class)	(Brazil) Fellipe Andrew; Alliance Jiu Jitsu	(Brazil) Yatan Bueno; Dream Art	(Poland) Adam Wardzinski; Checkmat
Absolute (Open Class)	(Brazil) Fellipe Andrew; Alliance Jiu Jitsu	(Brazil) Yatan Bueno; Dream Art	(Brazil) Matheus Felipe Xavier; Checkmat

== Women's medallists ==
Adult female black belt results

Division	Gold	Silver	Bronze
Rooster (48.5 kg)	(Brazil) Thaís Loureiro Felipe; Atos Jiu-Jitsu	(United States) Kaori Hernandez; Unique Logic Jiu-Jitsu HQ	
Rooster (48.5 kg)	(Brazil) Thaís Loureiro Felipe; Atos Jiu-Jitsu	(United States) Kaori Hernandez; Unique Logic Jiu-Jitsu HQ	n/a
Light-feather (53.5 kg)	(Brazil) Mayssa Bastos; Unity Jiu Jitsu	(Netherlands) Rose-Marie El Sharouni; Checkmat	(Brazil) Maria Eduarda Tozoni Ono; Kronos BJJ
Light-feather (53.5 kg)	(Brazil) Mayssa Bastos; Unity Jiu Jitsu	(Netherlands) Rose-Marie El Sharouni; Checkmat	(Spain) Naiomi Matthews; Team Ganbaru
Feather (58.5 kg)	(Brazil) Ana Rodrigues; Dream Art	(Brazil) Gabriela Pereira; Dream Art	Zofia Szawernowska; Brasa Poland
Feather (58.5 kg)	(Brazil) Ana Rodrigues; Dream Art	(Brazil) Gabriela Pereira; Dream Art	(Wales) Ashley Bendle; Gracie Barra
Light (64 kg)	(Brazil) Nathalie Ribeiro; CheckMat	(Brazil) Janaina Maia; Gracie Humaita	(France) Amandine Layec; Gracie Humaita International
Light (64 kg)	(Brazil) Nathalie Ribeiro; CheckMat	(Brazil) Janaina Maia; Gracie Humaita	(Italy) Margot Ciccarelli; Unity Jiu Jitsu
Middleweight (69 kg)	(Brazil) Thalyta Stefhane; Qatar BJJ / Vision Brasil	(United States) Erin Johnson; Iron Roots BJJ	
Middleweight (69 kg)	(Brazil) Thalyta Stefhane; Qatar BJJ / Vision Brasil	(United States) Erin Johnson; Iron Roots BJJ	(Brazil) Luciane Silva; CheckMat
Medium-heavyweight (74 kg)	(United States) Maggie Grindatti; Fight Sports	Magdalena Loska; Brasa Poland	(Italy) Rita Tana; Waza
Medium-heavyweight (74 kg)	(United States) Maggie Grindatti; Fight Sports	Magdalena Loska; Brasa Poland	(Brazil) Raiane Mara; Gracie Barra
Super-heavyweight (No Limit)	(Brazil) Gabrieli Pessanha; Infight JJ	Claire-France Thevenon; Panda Supa Crew	
Super-heavyweight (No Limit)	(Brazil) Gabrieli Pessanha; Infight JJ	Claire-France Thevenon; Panda Supa Crew	n/a
Absolute (Open Class)	(Brazil) Gabrieli Pessanha; Infight JJ	(Brazil) Thalyta Stefhane; Qatar BJJ / Vision Brasil	(Brazil) Anna Rodrigues; Dream Art
Absolute (Open Class)	(Brazil) Gabrieli Pessanha; Infight JJ	(Brazil) Thalyta Stefhane; Qatar BJJ / Vision Brasil	(Brazil) Nathalie Ribeiro; CheckMat

== Teams results ==
Results by Academy

Rank	Men's division	
Rank	Team	Points
1	Cicero Costha Internacional	46
2	CheckMat	37
3	Alliance Jiu Jitsu	30
4	Atos Jiu-Jitsu	29
5	GF Team	28
6	Dream Art	25
7	Nova União	22
8	Carlson Gracie Team	21
9	Gracie Barra	21
10	Art of Jiu Jitsu	19

Rank	Women's division	
Rank	Team	Points
1	CheckMat (Note: Checkmat’s 6th Adult Female European title, with most of the points won by Fightzone London, a Checkmat Team affiliate.)	50
2	Gracie Barra	45
3	Unity Jiu Jitsu	31
4	Qatar BJJ / Vision Brasil	24
5	Atos Jiu-Jitsu	24
6	GF Team	19
7	Infight JJ	18
8	ECJJA	14
9	Roger Gracie Academy	14
10	Brasa Poland	14

== See also ==
- Asian IBJJF Jiu-Jitsu Championship
- European IBJJF Jiu-Jitsu Championship
- Pan IBJJF Jiu-Jitsu Championship
- World IBJJF Jiu-Jitsu Championship
