= Devhonte Johnson =

Brazilian jiu-jitsu practitioner from the US

- Born: Paterson, New Jersey
- Nickname: Bones
- Division: Super-Heavyweight Gi; -100.5 kg (221.6 lb): Super-Heavyweight No-Gi; -97.5 kg (215.0 lb)
- Team: Bones Jiu-Jitsu (2019–present); Unity Jiu Jitsu (2015–2019)
- Rank: BJJ black belt (Note: under Murilo Santana)

Other information
- Occupation: BJj competitor and coach
- Website: bonesjiujitsu

Devhonte Johnson, commonly known as "Bones", is an American grappler and Brazilian jiu-jitsu black belt competitor and coach. A multiple time IBJJF World, Pan American and European champion in lower belt divisions; Johnson is a black belt IBJJF World No-Gi, Pan American No-Gi and European Open No-Gi Champion.

== Career ==
Devhonte M. Johnson was born in Paterson, New Jersey. During his senior year in Eastside High School he started training Brazilian jiu-jitsu (BJJ) under Coach Edson Carvalho with whom he stayed until purple belt.

In 2015, Johnson joined Unity Jiu Jitsu in New York City training under head instructor Murilo Santana. During this time, Johnson started competing winning the IBJJF World No-Gi Championship and the Pan IBJJF Jiu-Jitsu No-Gi Championship at every belt level. Johnson specializes in the Lasso Guard and Stack Pass techniques. While teaching at Unity HQ in Manhattan Johnson opened his own Unity Jiu-Jitsu affiliate in New Jersey.

In 2018 Johnson participated in numerous competitions as brown belt, winning the IBJJF World Jiu-Jitsu Championship, IBJJF World No-Gi Championship, IBJJF European Open Championship as well as the IBJJF Pans No-Gi Championship.

=== Black belt career ===
In August 2019, Johnson was awarded his black belt by Santana, that same year Johnson opened his own gym, Bones BJJ in Clifton, NJ. In 2021 he won Pan No-Gi and World No-Gi titles for the first time at black belt. In 2021 Johnson was ranked No. 1 in the IBJJF no-gi super heavyweight division.

Johnson was invited to compete in the BJJ Stars 10 Absolute Grand prix on 22 April 2023. He defeated Gutemberg Pereira by decision in the opening round before losing to eventual champion Erich Munis on points in the quarter-final.

Johnson is booked to compete against Vinicius 'Trator' Ferreira in the main event of Place of Peace Invitational 3 on August 13, 2023. He won by decision. Johnson competed in an 8-man tournament at Blue Collar FC: American Dream Conference on September 1, 2023. He lost his opening round match to Roosevelt Sousa. Johnson then entered the super-heavyweight division of the IBJJF No Gi Pan Championship 2023 on October 1, 2023, and won a silver medal.

Johnson competed in the ADCC North American East Coast Trials 2023 on October 15, winning a bronze medal in the under 99kg division.

Johnson agreed to represent Acai Republic in the over 91kg division at AIGA Champions League Final 2023 on December 13 and 14, but did not compete. Johnson then defeated Denis Gunic on points at Place of Peace Invitational 8 on September 14, 2024. Johnson then won a bronze medal in the super-heavyweight division and a gold medal in the absolute division of the IBJJF no gi Pan Championship 2024 on November 3, 2024.

Johnson won a silver medal in the absolute division at the IBJJF No Gi World Championship 2024. He then represented North America in the Polaris Squads Intercontinental Championship 2025. He went 2-2 against Team Europe at Polaris 32, but Team North America lost the match.

Johnson represented Team Al Leone at the AIGA Champions League finals 2025, going 2-0 as Al Leone finished in third place.

Johnson competed in the no gi absolute grand prix at BJJ Stars 16 on July 25, 2025. He was knocked out in the opening round.

== Fight history ==
Opponent	W/L	Method	Competition	Weight	Stage	Year
Thiago Sa	L	Referee Decision	No Gi Pan Am.	91KG	4F	2018
Nick Calvanese	L	Referee Decision	F2W 91	ABS	SPF	2018
Nicholas Albin	L	Referee Decision	ADCC EC Trials	99KG	R1	2018
Gilvan Costa	W	Armbar	NY Fall NGO	97KG	F	2018
Adriano Silva	W	Kimura	NY Fall NGO	ABS	4F	2018
Gabriel Almeida	W	Pts: 0x0, Adv	NY Fall NGO	ABS	SF	2018
Fernando Henrique	W	RNC	NoGi Worlds	91KG	R1	2018
Arnaldo Maidana	W	Pts: 2x0	NoGi Worlds	91KG	4F	2018
Jackson Sousa	L	Pts: 0x0, Adv	NoGi Worlds	91KG	SF	2018
Charles McGuire	W	Submission	Atlanta WO	94KG	F	2019
Julian Synan	W	Bow and arrow	Atlanta WO	ABS	R1	2019
JT Torres	L	Pts: 2x0	Atlanta WO	ABS	4F	2019
Gustavo Batista	L	Arm in Ezekiel	Pan American	88KG	8F	2019
Orlando Andavi	W	Choke from back	Pan American	ABS	R1	2019
Leandro Lo	L	Pts: 2x0	Pan American	ABS	R2	2019
Diogo Sampaio	W	Referee Decision	Washington DCO	88KG	SF	2019
Daniel Hampton	W	Choke from back	Washington DCO	88KG	F	2019
Nathan Santos	W	Pts: 3x0	Boston Sp. Open	88KG	SF	2019
Diogo Araujo	W	Pts: 2x2, Adv	Boston Sp. Open	88KG	F	2019
Faisal AlKitbe	L	Pts: 0x0, Pen	World Pro	85KG	4F	2019
Viking Wong	W	Pts: 6x0	World Pro	85KG	RPC	2019
William Dias	W	Pts: 2x0	World Pro	85KG	RPC	2019
DJ Jackson	L	Referee Decision	World Pro	85KG	3RD	2019
Matt Leighton	W	Referee Decision	F2W 111	85KG	SPF	2019
Tarsis Humphreys	L	Pts: 2x0	World Champ.	88KG	R1	2019
Tim Spriggs	L	Pts: 2x2, Pen	NY BJJ Pro	94KG	F	2019
Keenan Cornelius	L	Pts: 4x2	No Gi Pan Am.	97KG	SF	2019
Jonnatas Gracie	W	Referee Decision	No Gi Pan Am.	ABS	R1	2019
Vinicius Trator	W	Pts: 2x0	No Gi Pan Am.	ABS	8F	2019
Frederik Vosgrone	W	Pts: 2x0	No Gi Pan Am.	ABS	4F	2019
Keenan Cornelius	L	Armlock	No Gi Pan Am.	ABS	SF	2019
Marcelo Gomide	W	Adv	European NoGi	97KG	4F	2019
Samir Krvavac	W	Pts: 7x2	European NoGi	97KG	SF	2019
Helton Jose	W	Referee Decision	European NoGi	97KG	F	2019
Santeri Lilius	W	Pts: 6x0	European NoGi	ABS	R1	2019
Freddy Vosgrone	W	Adv	European NoGi	ABS	8F	2019
Max Bickerton	W	Pts: 11x0	European NoGi	ABS	4F	2019
Muslim Patsarigov	W	Referee Decision	European NoGi	ABS	SF	2019
Marcelo Gomide	L	Referee Decision	European NoGi	ABS	F	2019
Eliot Kelly	W	Referee Decision	F2W 131	120KG	SPF	2019
Gabriel Araujo	W	Pts: 11x0	NYC Fall Open	100KG	F	2019
Max Gimenis	L	Pts: 2x0	NYC Fall Open	ABS	SF	2019
Paul Ardila	W	Pts: 2x0	NYC Fall NGO	97KG	F	2019
Gabriel Almeida	W	Pts: 11x0	NYC Fall NGO	ABS	4F	2019
Yuri Silva	W	N/A	NYC Fall NGO	ABS	SF	2019
Arya Esfandmaz	W	Referee Decision	Polaris 12	104KG	SPF	2019
Fellipe Trovo	W	Pts: 0x0, Adv	NoGi Worlds	ABS	4F	2019
Roberto Abreu	L	Referee Decision	NoGi Worlds	ABS	SF	2019
Roberto Alencar	W	Pts: 2x0	NoGi Worlds	91KG	4F	2019
Jackson Sousa	L	DQ	NoGi Worlds	91KG	SF	2019
T. Clark	W	Choke from back	SUBVERSIV	ABS	R1	2020
Fellipe Andrew	W	Referee Decision	SUBVERSIV	ABS	SF	2020
Fellipe Trovo	L	Triangle	SUBVERSIV	ABS	F	2020
J. Oliver Jansen	W	Pts: 10x0	Pan American	ABS	R1	2020
Guilherme Augusto	W	Pts: 0x0, Adv	Pan American	ABS	8F	2020
Max Gimenis	L	Choke from back	Pan American	ABS	4F	2020
Guilherme Augusto	L	Pts: 8x2	Pan American	100KG	SF	2020
Vinicius Trator	W	Referee Decision	F2W 155	124KG	SPF	2020
Patrick Gaudio	L	Pts: 0x0, Adv	BJJ Stars 4	100KG	SPF	2020
Guilherme Augusto	W	Referee Decision	F2W 159	94KG	SPF	2020
Jackson Douglas	W	Referee Decision	Dallas Open	O100KG	SF	2021
Guilherme Augusto	L	Pts: 0x0, Adv	Dallas Open	O100KG	F	2021
Lucas Norat	W	Choke from back	Houston Open	100KG	SF	2021
Daniel Hampton	W	Pts: 18x0	Houston Open	100KG	F	2021
Michael Perez	W	Pts: 0x0, Adv	NoGi Pan Am.	97KG	4F	2021
Diego Ramalho	W	Referee Decision	NoGi Pan Am.	97KG	SF	2021
Arnaldo Maidana	W	Pts: 4x0	NoGi Pan Am.	97KG	F	2021
Yuri Simoes	L	Referee Decision	F2W 172	124KG	SPF	2021
Lucas Norat	W	Pts: 7x0	Pan American	100KG	4F	2021
Guilherme Augusto	L	Referee Decision	Pan American	100KG	SF	2021
Fellipe Andrew	W	Anaconda choke	NoGi Worlds	97KG	4F	2021
Elliot Kelly	W	Pts: 0x0, Pen	NoGi Worlds	97KG	SF	2021
Joe Dierkhising	W	Pts: 4x2	NoGi Worlds	97KG	F	2021
Kristopher Torres	W	RNC	ADCC EC Trials	99KG	R1	2021
Jon Beale	W	Armbar	ADCC EC Trials	99KG	R2	2021
Brandon Conrad	W	RNC	ADCC EC Trials	99KG	R3	2021
Joe Dierkhising	W	Pts: 4x0	ADCC EC Trials	99KG	4F	2021
Paul Ardila	W	Referee Decision	ADCC EC Trials	99KG	SF	2021
Mason Fowler	L	Referee Decision	ADCC EC Trials	99KG	F	2021
Arnaldo Maidana	W	Referee Decision	F2W 188	100KG	SPF	2021
Lucas Norat	W	Pts: 16x0	World Champ.	100KG	8F	2021
Fellipe Trovo	W	Pts: 3x0	World Champ.	100KG	4F	2021
Fellipe Andrew	L	Pts: 4x2	World Champ.	100KG	SF	2021

== Championships and accomplishments ==
Main Achievements (black belt level):

- IBJJF World Championship No-Gi Champion (2021)
- IBJJF Pan Championship No-Gi Champion (2021)
- IBJJF Houston Open Champion (2021)
- IBJJF European Open No-Gi Champion (2019)
- IBJJF Washington DC Open Champion (2019)
- 2nd place IBJJF European Open No-Gi (2019 (Note: Absolute))
- 3rd place IBJJF World Championship (2021)
- 3rd place IBJJF World Championship No-Gi (2018)
- 3rd place IBJJF Pan Championship (2020 / 2021)
- 3rd place IBJJF Pan Championship No-Gi (2019 (Note: Weight and absolute))

Main Achievements (colored belts ):

- IBJJF World Champion (2017 purple / 2018 brown)
- IBJJF World No-Gi Champion (2014 blue / 2015 purple / 2016 purple / 2017 brown)
- IBJJF Pans Champion (2016 purple / 2017 purple)
- IBJJF Pans No-Gi Champion (2014 blue / 2016 purple / 2018 brown)
- IBJJF European Open Champion (2017 purple / 2018 brown)
- IBJJF American Nationals No-Gi Champion (2017 brown)
- IBJJF NY Summer Open Champion (2017 brown)
- IBJJF NY Summer Open No-Gi Champion (2017 brown)
- IBJJF New York Fall Open No-Gi Champion (2018)
- 2nd place IBJJF World Championship (2016 purple)
- 2nd place IBJJF Pans Championship (2018 brown)
- 2nd place IBJJF European Open (2017 purple / 2018 brown)
- 3rd place IBJJF World Championship (2016 purple)
- 3rd place IBJJF World Championship No-Gi (2015 purple)
- 3rd place IBJJF Pans Championship (2015 purple)
- 3rd place CBJJ Brazilian Nationals (2018 brown)

== Instructor lineage ==
Mitsuyo Maeda > Carlos Gracie > Helio Gracie > Rickson Gracie > Marcelo Behring > Mario Yamasaki > Murilo Santana > Devhonte Johnson

== See Also ==
- Diego Pato
- Anderson Munis
