= Chloé McNally =

Brazilian jiu-jitsu practitioner from the US

- Born: San Francisco, US
- Division: GI Weight Classes: Middleweight (−69 kg); Medium Heavy (−74 kg); No-GI Weight Classes: Middleweight (− 66.5 kg); Medium Heavy (− 71.5 kg)
- Style: Brazilian Jiu-Jitsu
- Team: Unity Jiu Jitsu
- Trainer: Murilo Santana
- Rank: BJJ black belt

Chloé McNally is an American competitor of Brazilian jiu-jitsu. A No-Gi World Champion, IBJJF Pan American Champion and Brazilian National Champion in colored belts, McNally is a two-time World Jiu-Jitsu Championship and Pan Jiu-Jitsu Championship black belt medallist.

== Career ==
Chloé Michele McNally was born in San Francisco. In her youth she competed in Eventing, a horse riding events, reaching the AAU Junior Olympic Games. In 2014 she discovered Brazilian jiu-jitsu (BJJ) at a local martial arts school and then moved to Clockwork BJJ under 3rd Degree Black belt Josh Griffiths, where she earned her blue belt and started competing.

In 2016, she joined Unity Jiu Jitsu under former world champion Murilo Santana. The following year she became the 2017 No-Gi World Champion at blue belt, also earning a bronze in her weight division and silver in absolute at the Gi World Championship. She was also selected to compete at the UAEJJF World Pro Championship.

In 2018, as a purple belt, she won the IBJJF Brazilian National Championship and bronze at Pans. In 2019, still at purple belt, she became Pan Champion and won double silver at the World Championship. After receiving her brown belt, she won bronze at the No-Gi World Championship and silver at the Pan Championship (default gold in weight division). In August 2020, she competed at Subversiv 3, a grappling team tournament, gaining her first win against Pamela Boveda but losing to Kendall Reusing by head and arm choke, to Jena Bishop by armbar and to Bailey Luttrell by decision.

On May 22, 2021, McNally received her black belt from Santana. Competing for the first time as a black belt she earned a bronze in her weight division and a silver in absolute at the IBJJF Jiu-Jitsu Con in Las Vegas. McNally then gained a default bronze at the 2021 Pan Jiu-Jitsu Championship (losing to Ana Carolina Vieira) and a default bronze at the 2021 World Championship (losing to Elisabeth Clay). In 2022, she won gold at the Charleston Open, then won silver at the 2022 Pan Jiu-Jitsu Championship against Thamara Ferreira after losing by a penalty, silver at the Brazilian National Championship and bronze at the 2022 World Jiu-Jitsu Championship.

== Brazilian Jiu-Jitsu competitive summary ==
Main Achievements (Black Belt)

- 2nd Place IBJJF Pan Championship (2022)
- 2nd Place Brazilian National Championship (2022)
- 3rd Place IBJJF World Championship (2021 / 2022)
- 3rd Place IBJJF Pan Championship (2021)

Main Achievements (Coloured Belts)

- IBJJF World Jiu Jitsu No-Gi champion (2017 blue)
- IBJJF European Jiu Jitsu No-Gi champion (2019 brown)
- IBJJF Pan American champion (2019 purple)
- IBJJF Pan American champion (2020 brown)
- IBJJF Brazilian Nationals champion (2018 purple)
- 2nd Place IBJJF World Jiu Jitsu Championship (2019 (Note: Weight and absolute) purple)
- 2nd place IBJJF World Jiu Jitsu Championship (2017 (Note: Absolute) blue)
- 2nd Place IBJJF World Jiu Jitsu No-Gi Championship (2018 purple)
- 2nd place IBJJF Pan American Championship (2020 brown)
- 2nd place IBJJF Pan Jiu Jitsu Championship (2018 purple)
- 2nd place IBJJF Pan Jiu Jitsu No-Gi Championship (2017 blue)
- 2nd place IBJJF Pan Jiu Jitsu No-Gi Championship (2016 blue)
- 2nd place IBJJF American Nationals (2020 brown)
- 2nd place UAEJJF Abu Dhabi World Pro (2017 blue)
- 3rd place IBJJF World Jiu Jitsu Championship (2017 blue)
- 3rd place IBJJF World Jiu Jitsu No-Gi Championship (2019 brown)
- 3rd place IBJJF European Jiu Jitsu No-Gi Championship (2019 brown)
- 3rd place IBJJF Pan Jiu Jitsu Championship (2017 blue)
- 3rd Place IBJJF Pan Jiu Jitsu No-Gi Championship (2017 blue)
- 3rd place IBJJF No Gi American Nationals (2020 brown)

== Instructor lineage ==
Rickson Gracie > Marcelo Behring > Mario Yamasaki > Murilo Santana > Chloé McNally
