= Amy Campo =

American practitioner of Brazilian jiu-jitsu

- Born: January 30, 2000 (age 26); Utah, United States
- Height: 5 ft 7 in (1.70 m)
- Weight: 163.1 lb (74.0 kg; 11.65 st)
- Division: Medium-heavy; -74 kilograms (163 lb) (Gi); -71.5 kilograms (158 lb) (No-Gi)
- Team: Zenith BJJ
- Trainer: Eduardo Mori
- Rank: BJJ black belt (Note: under Eduardo Mori)

Amy Campo (born January 30, 2000) is an American submission grappler, and Brazilian jiu-jitsu (BJJ) black belt athlete.

A multiple time IBJJF World (Gi and No-Gi), Pans and American national jiu-jitsu champion in colored belts; Campo is a black belt World Jiu-Jitsu Champion in both Gi and No-GI and the first-ever American 60+ kg ADCC Submission Fighting World Champion.

== Early career ==
Amy Scot Campo was born on January 30, 2000, in Utah, United States, At the age of thirteen she began learning kickboxing, MMA, and Brazilian jiu-jitsu (BJJ) after watching her brother compete. Trained by 4th deg. BJJ black belt Eduardo Mori at his academy in Ogden, Campo started medalling in the juvenile division of tournaments such as the Pan IBJJF Championship and the American Nationals. In 2017 she won the American nationals in heavyweight, bronze in Absolute followed by silver at the Pans; in 2018, competing in the purple belt adult division, Campo won double silver at the 2018 American No-Gi Championship then became 2018 World No-Gi champion in middleweight. In October 2019, Campo fought an amateur MMA bout that she won via submission during Steelfist Fight Night event in Salt Lake City, Utah. In 2019 and 2020 Campo won the American No-Gi championship in both weight (medium-heavy) and absolute, winning both divisions again in 2021 in the same divisions as a brown belt.

Following a double gold medal performance at the 2021 World Jiu-Jitsu Championship as a brown belt, Campo was promoted to black belt by her coach while standing on the podium.

== Black belt career ==
=== 2022 ===
In April 2022 she won the ADCC West Coast Trials Women's 60 kg+ division after defeating Maggie Grindatti by submission, Elizabeth Clay by 13 points lead and Paige Ivette in the final. That same year Campo won the American championship in both gi and No-Gi before winning silver in the Absolute division of the 2022 World Jiu-Jitsu Championship, the first American to reach the absolute final in more than a decade.

In September 2022 Campo defeated multiple-time ADCC champion Gabi Garcia, Elisabeth Clay, and Rafaela Guedes at the 2022 ADCC World Championship, becoming ADCC world champion and the first-ever American to win the ADCC World 60+ kg division.

In her final competition of the year, Campo won the medium-heavyweight division of the IBJJF No-Gi World Championship and won another silver medal in the absolute division. In recognition of her first year at competing at black belt, she was awarded 'Female Breakout Grappler of The Year' at the Jitsmagazine 2022 BJJ Awards.

=== 2023 ===
Campo was invited to compete in the women's under 66 kg grand prix at Polaris 23 on March 11, 2023. She submitted Julia Maele and Brianna Ste-Marie before losing on points to Elisabeth Clay and earning a silver medal.

On March 26, 2023, Campo won a silver medal in the medium-heavyweight division of the IBJJF Pan Championship 2023. On June 4, 2023 she became Medium-heavyweight world champion at the 2023 World Jiu-Jitsu Championship and also won a bronze medal in the absolute division.

Campo competed in the women's openweight division of The Crown alongside Melissa Stricker, Tayane Porfírio, and Gabi Pessanha on November 19, 2023. She lost both matches.

=== 2024 ===
Campo won bronze medals in the middleweight and absolute divisions of the IBJJF World Championship 2024 on June 1, 2024. Campo then won gold medals in the medium-heavyweight gi and no gi divisions, and the no gi absolute division at the IBJJF American National Championship 2024 on June 28–29, 2024.

Campo was invited to compete in the over 65 kg division at the 2024 ADCC World Championship. She submitted Nikki Lloyd-Griffiths in the opening round and the lost to both Nathiely De Jesus and Kendall Reusing to finish fourth. She also competed in the women's absolute division, where she beat Amanda Leve and lost to Bia Mesquita, winning the bronze medal after her opponent in the third-place match could not compete.

== Brazilian Jiu-Jitsu competitive summary ==
Main achievements at black belt:

- IBJJF World Champion (2023)
- IBJJF World No-GI Champion (2022)
- ADCC Submission Fighting World Champion (2022)
- IBJJF American National Champion (2022 (Note: Absolute)}
- IBJJF American National No-Gi Champion (2022 (Note: Weight and Absolute))
- IBJJF Salt Lake City International Open Champion (2022)
- IBJJF Salt Lake City International No-Gi Open Champion (2022)
- IBJJF Denver International Open (2022)
- 2nd Place Polaris Under 66 kg Grand Prix (2023)
- 2nd Place IBJJF World Jiu-Jitsu Championship (2022)
- 2nd place IBJJF World No-Gi Championship (2022
- 3rd Place IBJJF World Jiu-Jitsu Championship (2023

Main achievements in colored belts:

- IBJJF World Champion (2021 brown)
- IBJJF World No-Gi Champion (2018 purple)
- IBJJF Pan Championship No-Gi Champion (2021 brown)
- IBJJF American Nationals No-Gi Champion (2019 purple, 2020, 2021 brown)
- 2nd place IBJJF American Nationals No-Gi Championship (2018 purple)
- 2nd place IBJJF World Championship (2018 purple)

Main achievements at Juvenile:

- IBJJF American Nationals (2017)
- 2nd Place IBJJF Pan Championship (2017)
- 3rd Place IBJJF Pan Championship (2017 blue)
- 3rd place IBJJF American Nationals (2017)
