= Adam Wardziński =

Polish jiu-jitsu practitioner

- Born: Adam Wardziński; April 22, 1991 (age 35); Poland
- Weight: 91.5 kg (202 lb; 14.41 st)
- Division: Adult / Male / Black / Heavy
- Style: Brazilian Jiu-Jitsu
- Team: Checkmat
- Rank: Black belt in Brazilian Jiu-Jitsu under Alan “Finfou” do Nascimento
- Years active: 2012-2025

Adam Wardziński
Medal record

Representing Poland

Brazilian Jiu-Jitsu

World IBJJF Jiu-Jitsu Championship
Gold medal – first place	2025 California, USA	-94 kg
Gold medal – first place	2024 California, USA	-94 kg

World IBJJF Jiu-Jitsu No-Gi Championship
Gold medal – first place	2019 California, USA	-91.5 kg
Bronze medal – third place	2021 California, USA	Absolute
Bronze medal – third place	2021 California, USA	-91.5 kg

Pan IBJJF Jiu-Jitsu Championship
Gold medal – first place	2023 Florida, USA	-94 kg
Silver medal – second place	2021 Florida, USA	-94 kg
Silver medal – second place	2019 California, USA	-94 kg
Bronze medal – third place	2024 Florida, USA	-94 kg

Pan IBJJF Jiu-Jitsu No-Gi Championship
Gold medal – first place	2023 Texas, USA	-91.5 kg

European IBJJF Jiu-Jitsu Championship
Gold medal – first place	2024 Paris, France	-94 kg
Gold medal – first place	2022 Rome, Italy	-94 kg
Silver medal – second place	2020 Lisbon, Portugal	-94 kg
Bronze medal – third place	2022 Rome, Italy	Absolute
Bronze medal – third place	2018 Lisbon, Portugal	-94 kg

European IBJJF Jiu-Jitsu No-Gi Championship
Bronze medal – third place	2017 Rome, Italy	-91.5 kg

Abu Dhabi World Professional Jiu-Jitsu Championship
Gold medal – first place	2020 Abu Dhabi, UAE	-94 kg
Silver medal – second place	2021 Abu Dhabi, UAE	-94 kg
Silver medal – second place	2019 Abu Dhabi, UAE	-94 kg
Silver medal – second place	2018 Abu Dhabi, UAE	-94 kg

Abu Dhabi World Masters Jiu-Jitsu Championship
Gold medal – first place	2020 Abu Dhabi, UAE	-94 kg

Abu Dhabi Grand Slam Jiu-Jitsu World Tour (Professional/Adult)
Gold medal – first place	2021 Moscow, Russia	-94 kg
Gold medal – first place	2020 London, UK	-94 kg
Gold medal – first place	2020 Abu Dhabi, UAE	-94 kg
Gold medal – first place	2019 Abu Dhabi, UAE	-94 kg
Gold medal – first place	2019 Tokyo, Japan	-94 kg
Silver medal – second place	2023 Florida, USA	-94 kg
Silver medal – second place	2019 Rio De Janeiro, Brazil	-94 kg
Silver medal – second place	2019 London, UK	-94 kg
Silver medal – second place	2018 Abu Dhabi, UAE	-94 kg
Silver medal – second place	2017 California, USA	-94 kg
Silver medal – second place	2017 Tokyo, Japan	-94 kg
Bronze medal – third place	2023 London, UK	-94 kg
Bronze medal – third place	2022 London, UK	-94 kg
Bronze medal – third place	2018 Rio De Janeiro, Brazil	-94 kg
Bronze medal – third place	2018 California, USA	-94 kg
Bronze medal – third place	2018 London, UK	-94 kg

Abu Dhabi Grand Slam Jiu-Jitsu World Tour (Masters)
Gold medal – first place	2023 Florida, USA	-94 kg
Gold medal – first place	2023 London, UK	-94 kg

Adam Wardziński (born April 22, 1991) is a Polish retired Brazilian jiu-jitsu practitioner who is a 2-time IBJJF World Champion and 2019 IBJJF No-Gi World Champion in the adult men's black belt heavyweight division. He is the first European to achieve world titles in the men's competitions. In the gi, he is the only non-Brazilian to win in the heavy (94kg) weight class apart from Robert Drysdale's win in 2005.

Wardziński is also the winner of the IBJJF Pan Championship (2023), IBJJF Pan No-Gi Championship (2023), IBJJF European Championship (2024, 2022), and AJP Abu Dhabi World Pro (2020), among other titles.

His nickname is "Megatron", not to be confused with Megaton Dias.

== Grappling career ==
=== 2020-2023 ===
Wardzinski represented Team Europe at Polaris Squads 2 on November 7, 2024. He drew two matches and Team Europe won the event 9–0. He then beat Rafael Lovato Jr. by decision in a superfight at Raw Grappling Championship 1 on November 14, 2021. Wardzinski also won the heavyweight division of the IBJJF European Championship 2022.

Wardzinski was then invited to compete in an absolute tournament at BJJ Stars 10: Battlefield on April 22, 2023. He won his opening round match and lost in the quarter-final. He then won a gold medal in the heavyweight division of the IBJJF Denver Open on May 6, 2023.

Wardzinski won a silver medal in the light-heavyweight division of the Abu Dhabi Grand Slam - Miami on September 17, 2024. He later won a gold medal at heavyweight in the IBJJF No Gi Pan Championship on October 1, 2024.

Wardzinski then won gold medals in the super-heavyweight and absolute divisions at the IBJJF Orange County Open on October 21, 2023. He also won gold medals in the super-heavyweight and absolute gi divisions, along with a silver medal in the super-heavyweight no gi division, at the IBJJF Nashville Fall Open on November 12, 2023. He later won a silver medal in the heavyweight division of the IBJJF No Gi World Championship on December 9, 2023.

=== 2024 - First world title ===
Wardzinski won a gold medal in the heavyweight division of the IBJJF European Championship on January 27, 2024. He then competed at the ADCC European, Middle-eastern, and African Trials on February 17, 2024, where he won a bronze medal at under 88kg.

Wardzinski won both the heavyweight and absolute divisions at the IBJJF Indianapolis Open on March 9, 2024. He then won a bronze medal in the heavyweight division of the IBJJF Pan Championship on March 24, 2024. Wardzinski won the heavyweight and absolute divisions at the IBJJF Denver Open on May 11, 2024.

Wardzinski then won a gold medal at the IBJJF World Championship on June 2, 2024, becoming the first European man to do so at black belt. He also won a gold medal in the heavyweight division of the IBJJF American National Championship 2024. Wardzinski also won the super-heavyweight division at the IBJJF London Fall Open on October 12, 2024.

Wardzinski competed in the heavyweight division of the second edition of The Crown on November 17, 2024. He beat Matheus Spirandeli, Horlando Monteiro, and Gustavo Batista in order to win the title.

Wardzinski won Male Grappler of the Year (Gi) at the Jits Magazine BJJ Awards 2024.

Wardzinski won a gold medal in the heavyweight division of the IBJJF European Championship 2025.

=== 2025 ===
Wardzinski won a gold medal in the heavyweight division of the IBJJF European Championship 2025. He then won a gold medal in the heavyweight division of the IBJJF Pan Championship 2025.

Wardzinski challenged Erich Munis for the absolute title at BJJ Stars 15 on April 26, 2025. He lost the match on points.

Wardzinski then won a second title in the heavyweight division at the IBJJF World Championship 2025, becoming the first European to win an IBJJF grand slam and announcing his retirement immediately afterward.

== Instructor lineage ==
Carlos Gracie > Helio Gracie > Rolls Gracie > Romero Cavalcanti > Ricardo Vieira > Alan Finfou > Adam Wardziński

== See also ==
- Erberth Santos
