= Josh Griffiths =

Josh Griffiths is the name of:

- Josh Griffiths (Casualty), fictional character
- Josh Griffiths (Jiu Jitsu practitioner), American martial artist
- Josh Griffiths (runner), Welsh runner
- Josh Griffiths (footballer), English footballer
