= Brianna Ste-Marie =

Brazilian jiu-jitsu practitioner from Canada

- Born: 30 August 1996 (age 30); Montreal, Quebec, Canada
- Division: Lightweight: Gi Weight Classes; Under 64 kilograms (141 lb); No-Gi Weight Classes; Under 61.5 kilograms (136 lb)
- Team: Brazilian Top Team (BTT)
- Trainer: Fábio Holanda; Leonardo Saggioro
- Rank: BJJ black belt

Other information
- Occupation: BJJ instructor
- University: Concordia University (BA, Human Environment)

Brianna Ste-Marie (born 30 August 1996) is a Canadian submission grappler, and Brazilian jiu-jitsu (BJJ) black belt athlete. An IBJJF World No-Gi, Pan American (Gi and No-GI), European and American national jiu-jitsu champion in coloured belts, as well as a Combat Jiu-Jitsu and Medusa champion; Ste-Marie is a 2022 World No-GI champion, a 2023 World Jiu-Jitsu Championship medallist and the 2022 ADCC Submission Grappling under 60 kilograms (130 lb) silver medallist.

== Biography ==
Brianna Ste-Marie was born on 30 August 1996, in Montreal, Quebec, Canada. A successful rugby player throughout her childhood and teenage years, she started training Brazilian jiu-jitsu (BJJ) after starting university. At 19 she decided to quit rugby for BJJ.

In December 2020 after getting promoted to brown belt, Ste-Marie became Combat Jiu-Jitsu flyweight champions after defeating Liz Tracy in the final. In October 2021 competing at Medusa 1, a Female-Only Jiu-Jitsu event, Ste-Marie became bantamweight Combat Jiu-Jitsu rules Medusa champion. after submitting Nikki Sullivan.

In 2021, Ste-Marie won the IBJJF No-Gi Worlds and the American Nationals, both at brown belt

== Black belt career ==
=== 2021-2022 ===
On 4 December 2021, after winning the ADCC East Coast Trials, defeating no-gi world champions Raquel Canuto and Nathalie Ribeiro and Jasmine Rocha, Ste-Marie was promoted to Brazilian Jiu-Jitsu black belt, by Brazilian Top Team Canada’s head coach, Fabio Holanda. At the end of 2021, Ste-Marie was awarded with "Female Breakout Grappler of the Year" by BJJ and grappling media outlet Jits magazine at the 2021 BJJ Awards.

In April 2022 Ste-Marie won the 2nd ADCC North American Trials thus qualifying for the ADCC World Championship. Ste-Marie became the first woman in ADCC history to win both East and West Coast trials in the same cycle, defeating 10 opponents across both Trials competitions. During the 2022 ADCC World Championship Ste-Marie won silver after defeating Finnish Elvira Karppinen in the first round and Bianca Basilia via Points (4-0) in the semi-final before losing to current BJJ World champion Ffion Davies in the final. In 2021 Jitsmagazine awarded Ste-Marie received their 'Female Breakout Grappler of the Year' award.

=== 2023 ===
She was then invited to compete in the women's under 66 kg grand prix at Polaris 23 on March 11, 2023. Ste-Marie won her opening round match against Maggie Grindatti but lost in the second round to Amy Campo. She next competed at the IBJJF Miami Open on April 29 and 30, 2023 where she won two gold medals in middleweight division and the absolute division. In June 2023 she won bronze at the 2023 World Jiu-Jitsu Championship in the light division.

Ste-Marie competed against Elisabeth Clay for the vacant featherweight Who's Number One title at WNO: Night of Champions on October 1, 2023. She lost the match by unanimous decision.

Ste-Marie was invited to compete in the women's lightweight division of The Crown on November 19, 2023 along with Luiza Monteiro, Janaina Lebre, and Nathalie Ribeiro. She lost to Monteiro in the opening round and chose not to compete in the bronze medal match.

=== 2024 ===
Ste-Marie challenged Ffion Davies for the under 55 kg title at Polaris 27 on March 23, 2024. She lost the match by submission.

Ste-Marie won a silver medal in the lightweight division of the IBJJF Brazilian National Championship 2024 on April 28, 2024.

Ste-Marie won a silver medal in the lightweight division of the IBJJF World Championship 2024 on June 1, 2024.

Ste-Marie was then invited to compete in the under 65 kg division of the 2024 ADCC World Championship. She defeated Morgan Black by decision in the opening round, lost on points to Helena Crevar in the semi-final, and lost a decision to Bia Mesquita in the bronze medal match to finish fourth. She also competed in the women's absolute division, getting submitted by Adele Fornarino in the opening round. She then won a gold medal in the middleweight division of the IBJJF No Gi European Championship on October 20, 2024.

Ste-Marie competed in the lightweight division at the second edition of The Crown on November 17, 2024. She defeated Jaine Fragoso, Gabrielle McComb, and Janaina Lebre to win the title.

Ste-Marie won a gold medal in the lightweight division and a silver medal in the absolute division at the IBJJF No Gi World Championship 2024.

=== 2025 ===
Ste-Marie faced Elisabeth Clay at UFC Fight Pass Invitational 10 on March 6, 2025. She won the match by submission.

Ste-Marie represented Team North America at Polaris 32 on June 28, 2025, going 2-1 and helping them beat Team Europe.

== Competitive summary ==
Main achievements:

- IBJJF World No-GI Champion (2022)
- 2nd Place 2022 ADCC Submission Fighting World Championship
- ADCC East Coast Trials winner (2021)
- ADCC West Coast Trials winner (2022)
- Combat Jiu-Jitsu flyweight Champion (2020)
- 3rd place IBJJF World Jiu-Jitsu Championship (2023)

In coloured belts:

- IBJJF World No-Gi Champion (2019 purple, 2021 brown)
- IBJJF Pan American Champion (2018 blue, 2020 purple)
- IBJJF Pan Championship No-Gi Champion (2018 blue, 2019 (Note: Weight and Absolute) purple)
- IBJJF European Open Champion (2020 purple)
- IBJJF American Nationals Champion (2021 brown)
- IBJJF American Nationals No-Gi Champion (2021 brown)
- 2nd place IBJJF American Nationals (2021 (Note: Absolute) brown)
- 2nd place IBJJF World Championship No-Gi (2018 blue)
- 2nd place IBJJF Pan Championship No-Gi (2017 blue)
- 3rd place IBJJF World Championship (2018 blue, 2019 purple)
- 3rd place IBJJF World Championship No-Gi (2019 purple, 2021 brown)
- 3rd place IBJJF Pan Championship (2020 brown)
- 3rd place IBJJF European Open (2020 purple)

== Instructor lineage ==
- Carlos Gracie > Helio Gracie > Carlson Gracie
  - Murilo Bustamante > Fábio Holanda > Brianna Ste-Marie
  - Sérgio Bolão > Ricardo Marques > Leonardo Saggioro > Brianna Ste-Marie
