= Mario Yamasaki =

Brazilian martial artist

- Born: Mario Yamasaki; April 22, 1964 (age 62); São Paulo, Brazil
- Other names: Mario Yamasaki Jr. “If He Dies, He Dies”; "The Grim Reaper"
- Style: Brazilian Jiu-Jitsu, Judo
- Teachers: Shigeru Yamasaki, Shigueto Yamasaki, Marcelo Behring, Otavio de Almeida
- Rank: 6th degree black belt in Brazilian Jiu-Jitsu; Judo black belt

Other information
- Occupation: Brazilian Jiu-Jitsu instructor, MMA referee
- Notable school: Yamasaki Academy
- Website: http://www.grappling.com

Mario Yamasaki (born April 22, 1964) is a Brazilian mixed martial arts referee licensed in many states, most recognizable from his duties with the Ultimate Fighting Championship (UFC), as well as founder and chief instructor of the International Yamasaki Academy. Yamasaki is a veteran of over 490 fights in the UFC, Strikeforce, WEC, EliteXC and Pride Fighting Championships.

== Biography ==
Yamasaki was born in São Paulo, Brazil, the oldest of two sons born to Shigeru Yamasaki (山崎 茂, Mario Yamasaki Sr.). Yamasaki's family has been teaching martial arts in Brazil for two generations. His father is half-Japanese.

Yamasaki and his younger brother Fernando, a 7th Red & Black Belt in BJJ, originally began training in judo as children under their father Shigeru, an 8th degree Red/White belt in the art and their uncle Shigueto Yamasaki Sr. (山崎 重人).

In 1986, at the age of 22 Yamasaki began training in Brazilian jiu-jitsu under 5th degree black belt Marcelo Behring (a black belt under his father Flavio Behring and Rickson Gracie), who began teaching jiu-jitsu at the same gym in São Paulo where Yamasaki taught judo.

Yamasaki's training under Behring would only last a short time as he would soon move to the United States, traveling frequently back to Brazil to continue his jiu-jitsu training under Behring, until the latter switched gyms. Yamasaki would continue his training in jiu-jitsu under his brother Fernando, who had begun training under Otavio de Almeida and Roberto Lage.

In January 2002, Otavio de Almeida, president of the Federação de Jiu-Jitsu Brasileiro de São Paulo, Brasil (Brazilian Jiu-Jitsu Federation of São Paulo, Brazil) promoted Yamasaki to 4th degree black belt.

== UFC career ==
Yamasaki first became affiliated with the UFC (then owned by Semaphore Entertainment Group), when both he and his brother helped the promotion organize their first event in Brazil, UFC Brazil: Ultimate Brazil in São Paulo. After the event, Yamasaki asked UFC referee 'Big' John McCarthy if there were any referee positions available with the company, and was told that the company was looking for someone, marking the beginning of Yamasaki's career as an MMA referee.

At UFC 142 Yamasaki controversially disqualified Erick Silva for illegal blows to the head of Carlo Prater. After the bout, in-ring announcer Joe Rogan criticized Yamasaki for making a bad decision. The UFC upheld his decision and did not seek appeal.

At UFC Fight Night: Machida vs. Anders, Yamasaki was criticized by observers, including Dana White, after he failed to stop a fight between Valentina Shevchenko and Priscila Cachoeira: Shevchenko landed over two hundred strikes to Cachoeira's three. Yamasaki later said that he let the fight go on because he wanted to "allow [Cachoeira] to be a warrior and keep fighting". Dana White has previously repeatedly called for Yamasaki to be precluded from refereeing future UFC events, due to numerous similar controversies. Since the event, Yamasaki has not applied for any UFC refereeing jobs although he has refereed a few other smaller organizations' events.

He announced in 2021 that he planned on applying for more regular officiating assignments, as well as taking a judging course organized by the California State Athletic Commission.

== Personal life ==
Yamasaki lives between São Paulo, Brazil, and Bethesda, Maryland, with his wife and children, where he co-owns and operates a chain of Brazilian jiu-jitsu schools. Yamasaki also owns a construction company in the United States. Yamasaki comes from a martial arts family. Both his father Shigueru Yamasaki and uncle Shigueto Yamasaki are high ranking judoka in Brazil. His brother Fernando Yamasaki holds black belt ranks in both Brazilian jiu-jitsu and judo. His cousin Shigueto Yamasaki, Jr. represented Brazil competing in judo at the 1992 Summer Olympics.

== See also ==
- Diego Pato
- Anderson Munis
