= Erberth Santos =

Brazilian jiu-jitsu black belt and IBJJF World Champion

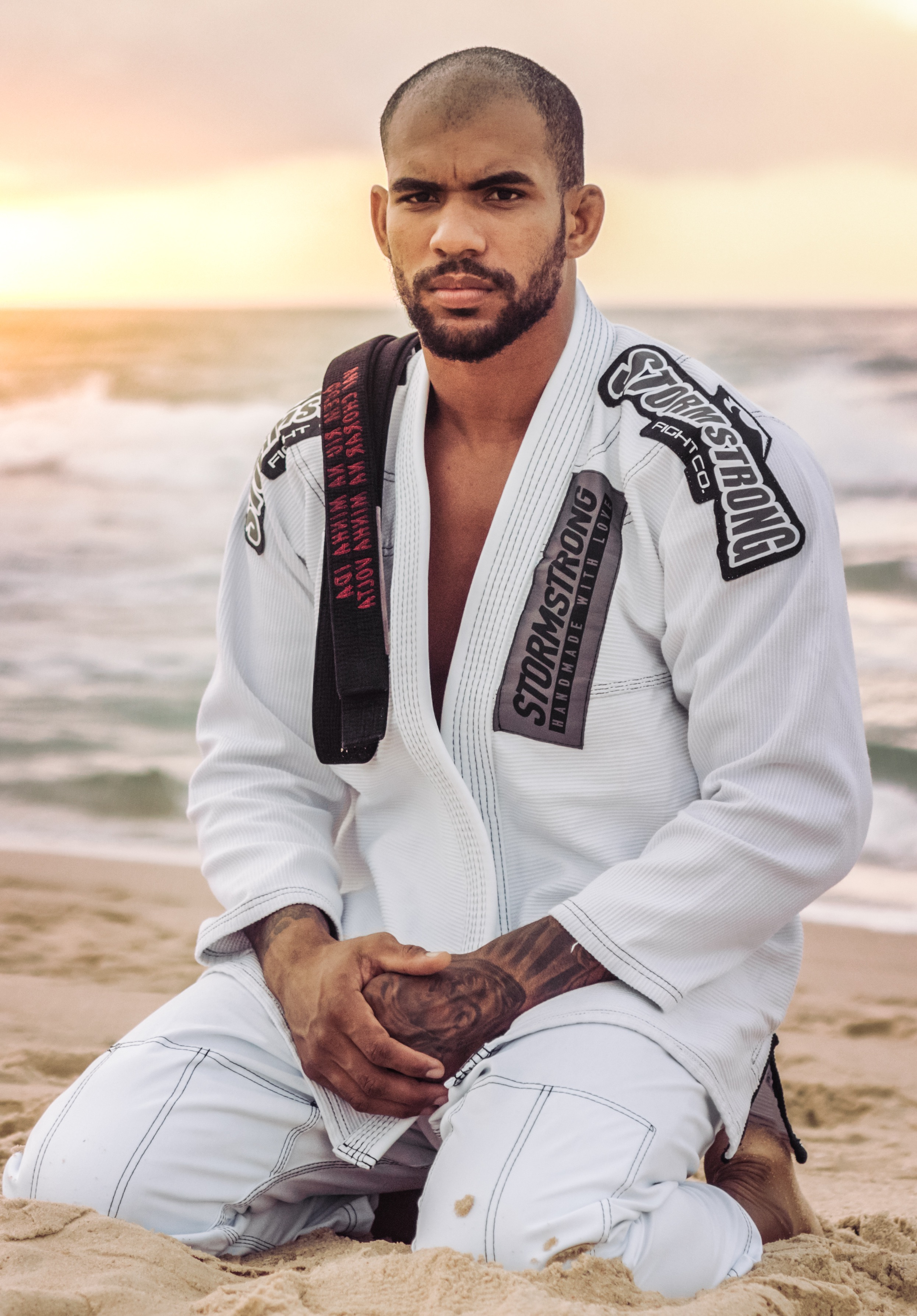
- Erberth Santos de Mesquita
- Born: Erberth Santos de Mesquita; February 17, 1994 (age 31); Zé Doca, Maranhão, Brazil
- Other names: Dino
- Nationality: Brazil
- Style: Brazilian jiu-jitsu
- Rank: Black belt in Brazilian jiu-jitsu under Luiz Guigo

Erberth Santos de Mesquita (born February 17, 1994 in Zé Doca, Brazil) is a Brazilian jiu-jitsu competitor, a black belt under Luiz Guigo, and the 2017 IBJJF World Champion in the super-heavyweight division.

== Biography ==
Santos moved at a young age to the city of Boa Vista, Roraima. He began training jiu-jitsu at the age of nine under the influence of his former brother-in-law, MMA fighter Fabiano Silva ("Jacarezinho"). He started training in the social project of the PF Team Association, coordinated by professor Pedro Freitas, which teaches jiu-jitsu to children in Roraima's capital.

In 2017, Santos founded his own team, the "Esquadrão Brasileiro de Jiu Jitsu", in São Paulo.

== World Jiu-Jitsu Championship ==
In 2016, he reached the final of the absolute division against Marcus Almeida, losing 6–4, which gave Almeida his fourth absolute world title.

In 2017, Santos became world champion in the super-heavyweight division by defeating Bernardo Faria.

== Controversies ==
In 2015, Santos elbowed his opponent during a competition, starting a brawl. In 2017, he was again involved in altercations, including an incident with Alexandre Vieira.

The year 2018 was particularly difficult for Santos. He was submitted by the Norwegian newly-promoted black belt Tommy Langaker at the European Championship, after allegedly kicking Langaker in the face moments before being submitted. He was later defeated again by Polish competitor Adam Wardziński at ACB Jiu Jitsu, in a match where Santos appeared to quit after falling behind. After these defeats, Santos announced that he would take time off from competition to focus on his academy.

In February 2019, Santos faced Felipe Preguiça at the BJJ Stars event. In the weeks leading up to the match and even during the weigh-ins, Santos engaged in heavy trash talk. Early in the fight, he complained of knee pain and received medical attention, but then began arguing with someone in the crowd. Moments later, he left the mat and charged into the audience, starting a brawl. Event staff and spectators attempted to restrain him, and Santos was removed from the venue. The victory was awarded to Felipe Preguiça by disqualification.

== Legal issues ==
On August 24, 2023, Erberth Santos and fellow fighter André Pessoa were arrested in Boituva, São Paulo, accused of committing at least four cases of rape and a series of robberies, involving knives, threats, and assaults, in several cities in Mato Grosso do Sul. Both Santos and Pessoa confessed to the crimes, and 26 cell phones were seized from them.

On August 25, 2023, the court ordered preventive detention for Santos and Pessoa, and they were transferred to the Dr. Antônio de Souza Neto penitentiary in Sorocaba, São Paulo, to await trial.

On November 16, 2024, Santos and Pessoa were sentenced to 14 years in prison.
