= Nathalie Ribeiro =

Brazilian jiu-jitsu practitioner from Brazil

- Born: 6 November 1992 (age 33)
- Other names: Nathalie Wan Soares Veras Ribeiro
- Nickname: Tata Ribeiro
- Division: Gi Weight Classes; Lightweight; (under 64 kg / 141.1 lbs): No-Gi Weight Classes; Lightweight; (under 61.5 kg / 135.6 lbs )
- Style: Brazilian Jiu-Jitsu
- Fighting out of: La Habra, California
- Team: Checkmat USA
- Trainer: Lucas Leite; João Aloísio Silva; Sylvio Behring
- Rank: black belt in BJJ

Other information
- Occupation: Brazilian jiu-jitsu instructor

Nathalie "Tata" Ribeiro (born 6 November 1992) is a submission grappler and black belt Brazilian jiu-jitsu competitor and instructor. A multiple time world champion in colored belt, Ribeiro is a three-time World Championship medallist, the 2019 World No-Gi Champion, the 2022 European Champion, the 2022 Pan-American champion and the 2021 Pan-American champion in both Gi and No-Gi.

== Early life ==
Nathalie Wan Soares Veras Ribeiro was born on 6 November 1992, in Recreio dos Bandeirantes, Rio de Janeiro, Brazil. At the age of eight Ribeiro started Jiu-Jitsu, both her parents trained with her father, a black belt and her mother a blue belt at the time. At 16 she received her blue belt then stopped training after becoming a mother; three years later she came back as a white belt starting at legendary red and white belt (8th degree) Sylvio Behring's academy, where she earned her blue and purple belts. As a purple belt Ribeiro won the 2015 SJJIF World Championship in Gi and No-Gi, both times in her weight division and in open class, she also won bronze at the IBJJF Pans Championship and the IBJJF World No-Gi Championship. She was promoted to brown by Aloisio and João Silva after receiving an athletic scholarship becoming part of their team as she moved to the US in March 2015. She became an IBJJF world champion in 2017 in both Gi and No-Gi, winning bronze that same year at the IBJJF Pans Championship. She joined Checkmat becoming an instructor at Checkmat's La Habra location in California while training under Lucas Leite, she won the 2018 Pans Championship.

== Black belt career ==
Leite promoted Ribeiro to black belt on 12 March 2018. As a black belt she won bronze at the 2018 World Championship, silver at the 2019 IBJJF American National in her weight division and gold in open class, Ribeiro then won gold at the 2019 World No-GI Championship. The following year she finished third at the 2020 European Open and won the Pan No-Gi championship. In 2021 she became Pan champion in both Gi and No-Gi; Ribeiro then won silver at the World No-GI in the middleweight division and finished third at the World Championship in the lightweight division. At the 2022 European Open she won gold in her weight class and bronze in open class (absolute) becoming European champion for the first time. At the 2022 Pan Jiu-Jitsu Championship Ribeiro defeated Ffion Davies, who she had previously never beaten in four matches, winning the title for the second time. In June Ribeiro won bronze at the 2022 World Championship.

=== 2023-2024 ===
Ribeiro competed in a superfight against Janaina Lebre in the IBJJF FloGrappling Grand Prix 2023 on March 3, 2023 and won the match 3-2 on points. At the IBJJF Santa Cruz International Open on April 22, 2023, Ribeiro won gold in the lightweight division. She then competed at the IBJJF San Diego Spring Open 2023 on May 20, winning gold in the featherweight division.

Ribeiro competed at the IBJJF Master World Championship on September 2, 2023, where she won the master 1 lightweight division.

Ribeiro competed in a superfight against Luiza Monteiro at ADXC 1 on October 20, 2023. She lost the match by unanimous decision.

Ribeiro was invited to compete in the women's lightweight division of The Crown on November 19, 2023 along with Brianna Ste-Marie, Janaina Lebre, and Luiza Monteiro. She won a silver medal at the event.

Ribeiro then won gold medals in the lightweight and absolute divisions of the IBJJF Houston Open on April 13, 2024, before also winning the lightweight division of the IBJJF Orange County Open on April 21, 2024.

Ribeiro won a gold medal in the featherweight division of the IBJJF World Championship 2024 on June 1, 2024.

== Brazilian Jiu-Jitsu competitive summary ==
Main Achievements (Black Belt)

- IBJJF World Champion No-Gi (2019)
- 2 x IBJJF Pan Champion (2021 / 2022)
- 2 x IBJJF Pan Champion No-Gi (2020 / 2021)
- IBJJF European Open Champion (2022)
- Abu Dhabi Grand Slam LA Champion (2018)
- IBJJF Las Vegas Open Champion (2018)
- IBJJF San Diego Open Champion (2018)
- IBJJF Dallas Spring Open Champion (2018)
- 2nd Place IBJJF Pan Championship (2020)
- 2nd Place IBJJF World Championship No-Gi (2021)
- 2nd Place IBJJF European Open (2023)
- 3rd Place IBJJF World Championship (2018 / 2021 / 2022)
- 3rd Place IBJJF European Open (2020)
- 3rd Place IBJJF Pan Championship (2019)

Main Achievements (Coloured Belts)

- IBJJF World Champion (2017 brown)
- IBJJF World Champion No-Gi (2017 brown)
- IBJJF Pans Champion (2018 brown)
- SJJIF World Champion No-Gi (2015 (Note: Weight and absolute) purple)
- 2nd Place UAEJJF Grand Slam LA (2017 brown)
- 2nd Place IBJJF American Nationals (2016 brown)
- 3rd Place IBJJF Pans Championship (2015 purple, 2017 brown)
- 3rd Place IBJJF World No-Gi Championship (2015 purple)

== Instructor lineage ==
Carlos Gracie > Hélio Gracie > Rolls Gracie > Romero Cavalcanti > Léo Vieira > Lucas Leite > Nathalie Ribeiro
