= João Assis =

Brazilian jiu-jitsu practitioner and mixed martial artist

- Born: Joao Francisco de Moraes Assis; July 11, 1983 (age 43); Porto Alegre, Rio Grande do Sul, Brazil
- Weight: 185 lb (84 kg; 13 st 3 lb)
- Division: Middleweight
- Team: Checkmat
- Rank: 2nd degree black belt in Brazilian Jiu-Jitsu under Léo Vieira
- Years active: (2004-2006, 2009-2010) (MMA)

Other information
- Mixed martial arts record from Sherdog

João Assis
Medal record

Representing Brazil

Grappling

ADCC Submission Wrestling World Championship
Silver medal – second place	2011 Nottingham, UK	-99kg
Gold medal – first place	2013 Beijing, China	-99kg

João Assis (born July 11, 1983), is a Brazilian Brazilian jiu-jitsu practitioner and a former mixed martial artist. Assis is a world no-gi champion and an ADCC gold and silver medalist. João became the 2013 ADCC Submission Grappling World Champion by defeating Dean Lister in the finals.

== Bio ==
Joao Francisco de Moraes Assis is Brazilian Brazilian jiu-jitsu black belt under Leonardo Vieira.

== Main achievements ==
Assis won the following titles:

- ADCC Champion (2013)
- World Nogi Champion (2015, 2010)
- World Champion (2007 – purple belt division)
- World Cup Champion (2007 – open weight division, purple belt – CBJJE)
- Pan American Champion (2009 – open weight, brown belt division)
- 10x Grapplers Quest Champion
- 2x NAGA Champion – NO GI advanced (2009 weight and open weight)
- 2x NAGA Champion – Jiu Jitsu (2009 weight and open weight)
- 2008 World NO GI Champion (2008 – brown belt division)
- 4x American National Champion
- California State Champion (2009 – open weight)
- ADCC Silver Medallist (2011)

== Mixed martial arts record ==
Fights record

Professional record breakdown
12 matches	5 wins	6 losses
By knockout	2	6
By submission	3	0
No contests	1	

Res.	Record	Opponent	Method	Event	Date	Round	Time	Location	Notes
Loss	5-6 (1)	Lorenz Larkin	KO (Slam)	Respect In The Cage 10	July 21, 2010	1	1:43	Los Angeles, California, United States	
Loss	5-5 (1)	Gerson Cordeiro	KO (Punches)	M-1 Challenge 19: 2009 Semifinals	September 26, 2009	1	3:50	Rustov Oblast, Russia	
Loss	5-4 (1)	Augusto Montano	TKO (Punches)	Total Combat 33	July 11, 2009	1	4:43	Mexico City, Mexico	
Loss	5-3 (1)	Luiz Cane	TKO (Punches)	Fury FC 2 - Final Combat	November 30, 2006	1	3:41	São Paulo, Brazil	
Loss	5-2 (1)	Victor Vianna	KO (Punches)	Fury FC 1 - Warlords Unleashed	September 27, 2006	1	1:57	São Paulo, Brazil	
Win	5-1 (1)	Jaguar Jaguar	KO (Punch)	Portugal Vale Tudo 2	October 1, 2005	1	n/a	Lisbon, Portugal	
NC	4-1 (1)	Jalison Silva Santos	No Contest	Clube Da Luta 4	May 24, 2005	1	4:43	Salvador, Bahia, Bahia, Brazil	
Win	4-1	Marlo Senck	Submission (rear naked choke)	Profight Championships 4	April 19, 2005	1	3:28	Porto Alegre, Rio Grande do Sul, Brazil	
Loss	3-1	Helio Dipp	KO (Punch)	Storm Samurai 6	May 19, 2005	1	2:56	Curitiba, Paraná, Brazil	
Win	3-0	Edinelson Nelsão	Submission (kimura)	Clube da Luta 2	May 15, 2005	1	2:10	Salvador, Bahia, Bahia, Brazil	
Win	2-0	Roberto Piazza	TKO (punches)	Profight Championship 3	January 31, 2005	1	0:40	Porto Alegre, Rio Grande do Sul, Brazil	
Win	1-0	Valdir Linhares	Submission (rear-naked choke)	Profight Combat Show	May 24, 2004	3	4:03	Porto Alegre, Rio Grande do Sul, Brazil	

== Sources ==
- bjjheroes
- sherdog
