= Rose El Sharouni =

Brazilian jiu-jitsu practitioner from the Netherlands

- Born: Rose-Marie El Sharouni; 28 September 1991 (age 35); Heerlen, Netherlands
- Division: feather / lightfeather
- Team: BJJAA/Checkmat
- Rank: black belt in BJJ (Note: under Léo Vieira)

Rose El Sharouni is a Dutch born Brazilian jiu-jitsu practitioner and competitor. A two-time World Champion in coloured belts, she is an IBJJF black belt World, European Open and Pan American medallist.

== Biography ==
Rose-Marie El Sharouni was born on 28 September 1991, in Heerlen, Netherlands. From the age of 6 she practised judo before leaving it for traditional Jiu jitsu, then Brazilian jiu-jitsu (BJJ) at the age of sixteen. She started to train and compete under Brazilian Jiu Jitsu Academy Amsterdam (a Checkmat affiliate). Training BJJ while studying medicine, she received her black belt from Vieira in 2019.

El Sharouni is the co-founder of Ladies Only BJJ, an organisation that set up BJJ training camps for women and promotes women's BJJ.

== Competitive career ==
=== 2023-2024 ===
On March 26, 2023, El Sharouni won a silver medal in the light-featherweight division of the IBJJF Pan Championship 2023. She then competed at the Abu Dhabi Grand Slam Tour - Abu Dhabi on May 7, 2023 and won a bronze medal in the light-featherweight division.

El Sharouni competed in the IBJJF World Championship 2023 on June 3 and 4, 2023 and won a bronze medal in the light-featherweight division. She next competed in the light-featherweight division of the IBJJF European Championship on January 27, 2024, winning a bronze medal.

== Championships and accomplishments ==
Main Achievements (black belt level):

- 2nd place IBJJF Pan American Championship (2023)
- 2nd place IBJJF European Open (2022)
- 2nd place AJP Abu Dhabi World Pro (2021 / 2022)
- 2nd place AJP Abu Dhabi Grand Tour London (2018 / 2019)
- 3rd place IBJJF World Championship (2021 / 2022 / 2023)
- 3rd place IBJJF European Open (2020 / 2023)
- 3rd place IBJJF London International Open (2023)
- 3rd place AJP Abu Dhabi Grand Tour Abu Dhabi (2023)
- 3rd place AJP Abu Dhabi Grand Tour London (2022)

Main Achievements (Colored Belts):

- IBJJF European Open Champion (2015 blue, 2019 brown)
- 3rd place IBJJF World Championship (2018 brown)

== Awards ==
- Ranked No. 1 European athlete in UAEJJF and AJP competitions. (2022)
