= Leandro Vieira =

Brazilian jiu-jitsu instructor and competitor

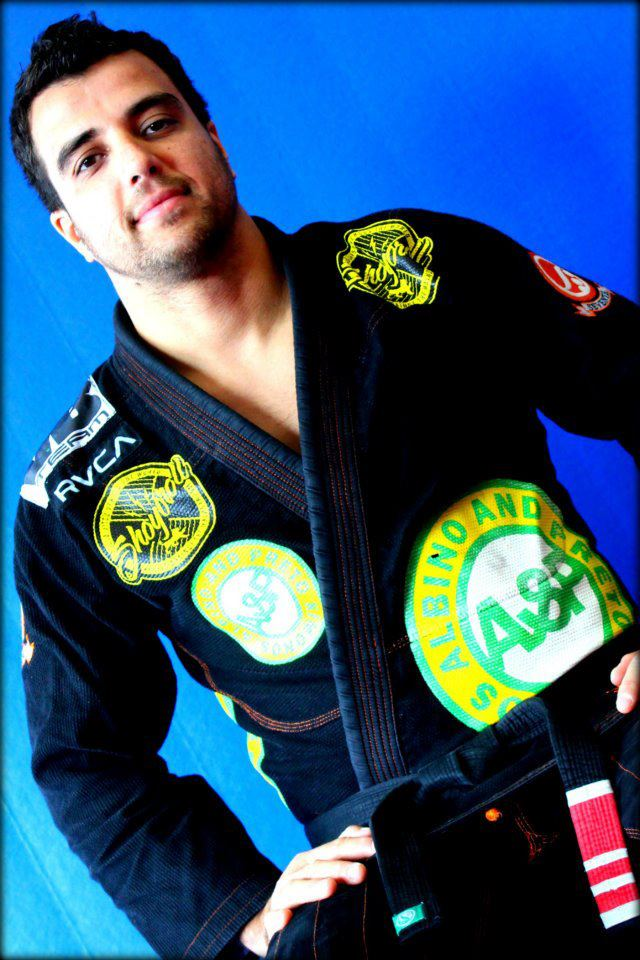
- Leandro Vieira
- Born: June 5, 1981 (age 45); Rio de Janeiro, Brazil
- Nickname: Leandrinho or Boneco do Posto
- Height: 6 ft 0 in (1.83 m)
- Weight: 185 lb (84 kg; 13.2 st)
- Division: Middle Heavyweight
- Style: Brazilian jiu-jitsu
- Team: Checkmat and American Kickboxing Academy
- Rank: 5th degree Black Belt in Brazilian Jiu Jitsu
- Years active: 1988-present

Other information
- Notable relatives: Léo Vieira and Ricardo Vieira

Leandro Vieira is a Brazilian jiu-jitsu instructor and competitor, and a co-founder of Checkmat. He is also the Brazilian jiu-jitsu head coach for the MMA team at American Kickboxing Academy, renowned for being one of the most successful teams in the world.

== Brazilian jiu-jitsu ==
Leandro Vieira began training jiu-jitsu at five years old. He has won medals at IBJJF Championships such as the Brazilian jiu-jitsu World Championships, Brazilian Nationals, Paulista Regionals, Las Vegas Open and Submission Ink Grappling Tournament. He holds a 4th-Degree Black Belt in Brazilian jiu-jitsu.

=== Leandro's records ===
1999 - 1st place Blue Belt Feather Weight at the Brazilian Nationals
2000 - 3rd place Purple Belt Feather Weight at the World jiu-jitsu Championship
2002 - 1st place Brown Belt at the Regional Paulista jiu-jitsu Championship
2010 - 3rd place Black Belt Absolute Division at Submission Ink Grappling Tournament
2010 - 3rd place Black Belt Master Medium Heavy at the Las Vegas International Open
2011 - 2nd place Black Belt Master Medium Heavy at the Las Vegas International Open

== Checkmat BJJ ==
One of the most successful teams in contemporary Brazilian jiu-jitsu, Checkmat's worldwide headquarters is in São Paulo, Brazil. CheckMat was established in 2008 by its founder and head coach, Leo Vieira. Since its creation, Checkmat has become one of the top teams in Brazilian jiu-jitsu.

=== Checkmat's records ===
2013
2nd Place - World Championship
1st Place - European Open Championship Adult and Female
3rd Place - European Open Championship Master & Senior
3rd Place - European Open No-Gi Championship

2012
1st Place - Pan Kids Championship
2nd Place - Pan Championship

2011
1st Place - World No-Gi Championship
2nd Place - World Championship
1st Place - Brazilian Nationals Adult
2nd Place - Brazilian Nationals Female 3rd Place - European Open Championship Adult
1st Place - European Open Championship Female 1st Place - European Open Championship Master & Senior 2nd Place - European Open Championship Novice

2010
2nd Place - World No-Gi Championship Adult
2nd Place - World No-Gi Championship Female
3rd Place - World Championship
2nd Place - European Open Championship Adult
1st Place - European Open Championship Master & Senior 3rd Place - European Open Championship Novice

2009
1st Place - World No-Gi Championship Adult
3rd Place - World Championship
1st Place - European Open Championship Adult
2nd Place - European Open Championship Master & Senior
3rd Place - European Open Championship Novice

2008
1st Place - World No-Gi Championship
