= Anderson Munis =

Brazilian jiu-jitsu practitioner (born 1995)

- Born: Anderson Munis dos Santos; 25 July 1995 (age 31); Panorama, São Paulo, Brazil
- Nationality: Brazilian
- Division: Super-heavyweight
- Style: Brazilian jiu-jitsu
- Team: Fratres
- Trainer: Isaque Bahiense and Gabriel Figueiró
- Rank: Black belt in Brazilian jiu-jitsu under Isaque Bahiense and Gabriel Figueiró

Anderson Munis dos Santos is a Brazilian grappler and Brazilian jiu-jitsu (BJJ) competitor who competes in the super-heavyweight division. In 2024, he won the IBJJF World Championship in the black belt super-heavyweight division.

== Early life and background ==
Munis was born in Panorama, São Paulo, Brazil. He began training Brazilian jiu-jitsu with his brothers, including Erich Munis.

== Professional career ==
Munis trained at the Dream Art Project alongside his brothers. In 2021, Munis won the Big Deal Pro 3 event, defeating Erberth Santos in the final. In 2023, Anderson and Erich Munis left the Dream Art Project and joined Fratres Jiu-Jitsu. In 2024, Munis won the super-heavyweight division at the IBJJF World Championship.

== Notable achievements ==
Only achievements covered by independent, reliable sources are listed here:

- IBJJF World Jiu-Jitsu Championship (2024) — Super-heavyweight, black belt.

== See also ==
- Erich Munis
- Diego Pato
