= Elisabeth Clay =

Brazilian jiu-jitsu practitioner from the US (born 2000)

Elisabeth Clay Moreira
- Born: Elisabeth Ann Clay; June 10, 2000 (age 26); Katy, Texas, U.S.
- Division: Gi weight classes Medium Heavy -74 kg (163.1 lb); Middleweight -69 kg (152.1 lb)
- Team: Ares BJJ; Legacy; Anchorage Brazilian jiu-jitsu
- Rank: BJJ black belt (Note: under Osvaldo Moizinho and Samir Chantre)

Other information
- Occupation: BJJ instructor
- Website: https://www.instagram.com/elisabethclaybjj/

Elisabeth Clay Moreira (born 2000) is an American submission grappler, Brazilian jiu-jitsu practitioner and competitor. Clay won multiple World and Pan championships titles (Gi and No-Gi) throughout her colored belts as well as the ADCC West Coast Trials when just a 16-year-old blue belt. She is a black belt 3X World No-Gi champion, a 4X Pan No-Gi champion as well as a World, European Open and Brazilian Nationals medallist. As of March 2024, Clay was listed as FloGrappling's #2 female in the world for no-gi pound-for-pound rankings.

== Early life ==
Elisabeth Ann Clay Moreira was born on June 10, 2000, in Katy, Texas, USA. when she was still a child her family moved to Oklahoma and then Alaska. From a family of competitive gymnasts Clay tried gymnastics before joining a local MMA gym at 12 where she started Brazilian jiu-jitsu.

== Early career ==
In 2016, after competing at IBJJF World Championship in the juvenile blue belt division, winning gold in heavyweight and silver in the Absolute, Clay moved to Legacy Jiu Jitsu (an Ares Affiliate) in Anchorage, Alaska. Clay trained under coach Jordan Kontra and started competing in major tournaments. As a 16-year-old blue belt, Clay upset the bracket by winning 2017 ADCC Submission Grappling West Coat Trials. (Note: The ADCC 2017 Trials were qualification events for the ADCC 2017 World Championships which Clay was unable to attend due to a knee injury.) Clay started to be known as a "black belt killer" after defeating brown and black belt opponents. In 2018 she won medium heavy and the open class at Pan Championship then became absolute blue belt World champion. She was then promoted to purple belt.

Mid-2018, Clay moved to Modesto, California to train under Samir Chantre and Osvaldo Moizinho at the Ares Jiu-Jitsu Team headquarters. In February 2019 she arrived third in the 2nd ADCC North American Trial. In March 2019, Clay won double bronze at purple belt at the 2019 Pan Championship. In 2019, she won IBJJF World No-Gi Championship at brown belt, submitting all her opponents in the process. At Fight 2 Win 143 in June 2020 she defeated World No-Gi super-heavy and open weight black belt champion Kendall Reusing via Split Decision. At Fight 2 Win 147 in July 2020 Clay submitted 2x IBJJF world champion Luiza Monteiro via outside heel hook.

== Black belt career ==
=== 2020-2022 ===
In November 2020 she received her black belt from Moizinho and Chantre. In January 2021 FloGrappling chose her as the "2020 Female Grappler of the Year". In February she made her black belt Gi debut at Fight to Win 165 where she submitted no. 2-ranked medium heavyweight Maria Malyjasiak via toehold, winning in the process the welterweight Gi title.

In May 2021 at Subversiv 5 taking place in Miami in May, Clay won the Superfight submitting Andressa Cintra with a kneebar, a few weeks later Clay won silver at the Pan-American Championship then double gold at the 2021 Pan No-Gi with a 100% submission rate at both middleweight and in the absolute division, submitting Kendall Reusing in the openweight final. In October Clay won her first black belt world title at the 2021 World No-Gi Championship, also winning silver in openweight.

In April 2022 Clay participated in the ADCC West Coast Trials but lost on points to Amy Campo in the semi-final. In September she was invited to compete at the 2022 ADCC World Championship replacing Carina Santi, Clay lost on points to Amy Campo. At the 2022 Pan No-Gi taking place in October Clay won her weight and the openweight for the second year in a row after submitting all six of her opponent.

=== 2023 ===
Clay competed in the 2023 IBJJF European Championship, winning a bronze medal in the middleweight division. She was then invited to compete in the women's under 66 kg grand prix at Polaris 23 on March 11, 2023. Clay defeated Joanna Dineva, Ffion Davies, and Amy Campo in one night to win the tournament.

On March 26, 2023, Clay won a gold medal in the middleweight division of the IBJJF Pan Championship 2023. She then competed in the Campeonato Brasileiro de Jiu-Jitsu on May 7, 2023 and won a pair of bronze medals in the middleweight and absolute divisions. Clay then competed at the IBJJF American National Championship 2023, winning a silver medal at middleweight and a bronze medal in the absolute division on July 7. In the no gi edition of the competition on July 8, she won a gold medal at middleweight and a gold medal in the absolute division.

Clay competed against Brianna Ste-Marie for the vacant featherweight Who's Number One title at WNO: Night of Champions on October 1, 2023. She won the match by unanimous decision.

Clay competed against Luiza Monteiro at UFC Fight Pass Invitational 5 on December 10, 2023. She won the match by submission with a heel hook.

=== 2024-2025 ===
After taking time away from competition in order to have a child, Clay returned at the IBJJF No Gi Pan Championship 2024. She won both the heavyweight and absolute divisions of the tournament on November 3, 2024.

Clay then won a gold medal in the middleweight division at the IBJJF No Gi World Championship 2024.

She faced Brianna Ste-Marie at UFC Fight Pass Invitational 10 on March 6, 2025. She lost the match by submission.

Clay then put her WNO featherweight title on the line against Helena Crevar at Who's Number One 27: Rodriguez vs Duarte on April 18, 2025. She lost the match by submission.

== Championships and accomplishments ==
Main Achievements (black belt level):

- 4 x IBJJF Pan No-Gi Champion (2022 / 2021 (Note: Weight and absolute))
- 3 x IBJJF World No-Gi Champion (2022 (Note: Absolute) / 2021)
- 3 x IBJJF American National (2022 / 2021)
- Polaris Under 66 kg Grand Prix Champion (2023)
- IBJJF American National No-Gi Champion (2022)
- IBJJF Dallas International Open Champion (2021)
- SUBVERSIV Tournament Champion (2020)
- F2W Heavyweight Champion (2021)
- 2nd place IBJJF World Championship (2021)
- 2nd place IBJJF World No-Gi Championship (2021)
- 2nd place IBJJF Pan Championship (2021)
- 2nd place CBJJ Brazilian Nationals (2022)
- 2nd place IBJJF American National (2022)
- 2nd place Abu Dhabi Grand Slam Miami (2022)
- 3rd place IBJJF European Open Championship (2023)
- 3rd place CBJJ Brazilian Nationals (2023)

Main Achievements (colored belts ):

- 4 x IBJJF World No-Gi Champion (2018 purple, 2019 brown)
- 3 x IBJJF World Juvenile Champion (2016 / 2017)
- 3 x IBJJF Pan No-Gi Champion (2018 blue, 2019 purple)
- 2 x IBJJF World Champion (2018 blue)
- 2 x IBJJF Pan Champion (2018 blue)
- 2 x IBJJF Pan Juvenile Champion (2016)
- IBJJF Pan Championship No-Gi Champion (2019 purple)
- ADCC American Trials Champion (2017)
- 2nd place IBJJF World Championship (2018 blue)
- 2nd place IBJJF World Juvenile Championship (2016
- 2nd place IBJJF Pan Championship Juvenile (2017)
- 3rd place IBJJF Pan Championship (2019 purple)
- 3rd place ADCC American Trials (2019)

== Instructor lineage ==
Mitsuyo Maeda > Carlos Gracie Sr. > Helio Gracie > Carlos Gracie Junior > Samir Chantre > Elisabeth Clay
