= Diego Pato =

Brazilian submission grappler

Diego Oliveira Batista
- Born: October 2, 1998 (age 28); Parintins, Amazonas, Brazil
- Other names: Diego "Pato" Oliveira
- Nationality: Brazilian
- Style: Brazilian jiu-jitsu
- Team: PSLPB (Projeto Social Lutando Pelo Bem)
- Rank: Black belt under Cícero Costha
- Years active: 2010s–present

Diego Oliveira Batista (born October 2, 1998), commonly known as Diego "Pato" Oliveira, is a Brazilian professional submission grappling athlete and Brazilian jiu-jitsu black belt.

Oliveira has competed in professional grappling events including the Who's Number One (WNO) series. His matches and appearances in professional grappling competitions have been reported by specialized martial arts media outlets such as FloGrappling, JitsMagazine, and GracieMag.

== Background ==
Oliveira was born in Parintins, in the state of Amazonas, Brazil, and later spent part of his youth in Manaus.

He began training Brazilian jiu-jitsu as a teenager and later moved to São Paulo, where he joined the PSLPB training group led by Cícero Costha.

Oliveira received his black belt in Brazilian jiu-jitsu in 2019 under Costha.

== Professional grappling career ==
Following his promotion to black belt, Oliveira began competing more frequently in international submission grappling events. He has competed in professional events including the Who's Number One (WNO) promotion.

Publications such as JitsMagazine and GracieMag have reported on his appearances in professional grappling competitions and his participation in events organized by major grappling promotions.

== Technical style ==
Media coverage by FloGrappling has discussed Oliveira's use of guard-based positions during professional submission grappling matches.

== See also ==
- Josh Griffiths
- Devhonte Johnson
