= Josh Griffiths (Jiu Jitsu practitioner) =

American BJJ practitioner

- Born: April 25, 1980 (age 46); San Diego, CA
- Nationality: American
- Height: 1.905 m (6 ft 3 in)
- Weight: 187 lb (85 kg; 13.4 st)
- Style: Brazilian Jiu-Jitsu
- Fighting out of: New York City, U.S.
- Team: Clockwork Jiu Jitsu
- Rank: 3rd Degree Black belt in Brazilian Jiu-Jitsu
- Years active: 2002–present

Josh Griffiths (born April 25, 1980) is a Brazilian Jiu-Jitsu practitioner and an instructor of the sport in New York.

== Biography ==
Griffiths began training Brazilian jiu-jitsu in 2001 while also studying Engineering at Stevens Institute of Technology. He first learned of the sport after attending an Ultimate Fighting Championship competition in New Jersey and becoming interested in mixed martial arts (MMA). Griffiths received his black belt in 2007 from Kenny Florian. Currently, Griffiths owns Clockwork BJJ in New York City's NoHo neighborhood.

== Competitive Summary ==
- 2011 Abu Dhabi World Pro (Canadian Trials) Champion (brown / black belt)
- 2011 Abu Dhabi World Pro (New Jersey Trials) Champion (brown / black belt)
- 2010 Abu Dhabi World Pro (Canadian Trials) Champion (brown / black belt)
- 2007 Pan American Champion (brown belt)
- 2005 Pan American Championship, 2nd place (purple belt)

== See Also ==
- Diego Pato
