= Unity Jiu Jitsu =

Brazilian jiu-jitsu academy and team in NYC

Unity Jiu-Jitsu
- Date founded: 2015
- Country of origin: United States
- Founder: Paulo & Joao Miyao, Murilo Santana, Ana Lowry, & Yago De Souza
- Current head: Murilo Santana
- Arts taught: Brazilian jiu-jitsu, Grappling
- Practitioners: Thiago Abud; Mayssa Bastos; Felipe Cesar; Jeferson Guaresi; Devhonte Johnson; Levi Jones-Leary; Leandro Lo; Chloé McNally; Italo Moura; Edwin "Junny" Ocasio
- Official website: unityjiujitsu.com

Unity Jiu-Jitsu is a Brazilian jiu-jitsu academy and team started in 2015 with its headquarter based in New York City. Murilo Santana is the head instructor.

== History ==
Unity Jiu Jitsu was established in New York City in January 2015 by Paulo Miyao, his brother Joao, Ana Lowry, and Yago de Souza, all from Cicero Costha's academy in Brazil as well as Murilo Santana from Barbosa Academy. Murilo Santana became the head instructor while the Miyao brothers and Yago De Souza were resident athletes.

The first Unity members to compete at the 2015 IBJJF World Championship were Paulo & Joao Miyao, Murilo Santana, Leandro Lo, Luiza Monteiro, Yago De Souza, Mitch MacDonald, Devhonte Johnson, Matheus Francisco, Junny Ocasio, Brian Richards, Alix Cornu, Thiago Abud, Andres Limongi, Johnavelle Gabriel, Tanner Rice, Ana Lowry, Asif Mansoor, and Antoine Delannoy. Unity ended their first world championship in the top ten academies with 19 points. In June 2020 the Miyao Brothers announced their departure from the team.

== Notable members ==
A list of current and former members:

- Thiago Abud
- Wilson Moreira
- Felipe Cesar
- Margot Ciccarelli
- Eddie Cummings
- Yago de Souza
- Jeferson Guaresi
- Devhonte Johnson
- Levi Jones-Leary
- Leandro Lo
- Paulo Miyao
- Joao Miyao
- Chloé McNally
- Luiza Monteiro
- Italo Moura
- Edwin 'Junny' Ocasio
- Sebastian Rodriguez
- John Ortiz
- Lisander Lopez
- Christopher Soto
- Brandon Thai Tran
- Franco Diaz
- Robin Hwang
- Rafael Briones
- Anthony Raheem Williams

== See also ==
- Brazilian Jiu-Jitsu
- Grappling
