= Maggie Grindatti =

Brazilian jiu-jitsu practitioner from the US

- Born: Margaret Rose Grindatti; 10 June 1992 (age 34); Saco, Maine, U.S.
- Division: Medium Heavy Gi -74 kg (163.1 lb); Medium Heavy No-Gi -71.5 kg (157.6 lb)
- Team: Fight Sport; K team Martial Arts Academy
- Rank: black belt in BJJ (Note: under Roberto “Cyborg” Abreu)

Maggie Grindatti is an American grappler and Brazilian jiu-jitsu black belt competitor. A multiple-time World, Pan and American Nationals champion (Gi and No-Gi) in colored belt, Grindatti is a 2022 European Open Champion, an ADCC West Coast Trial medalist and a World and Pan No-Gi black belt medallist.

== Biography ==
Margaret Rose Grindatti was born on 10 June 1992, in Saco, Maine, USA. the daughter of Kurt and Kim Grindatti. A team athlete since high-school, she played Division 1 field hockey while an undergraduate at the University of Pacific.

After graduating with a Bachelor Of Arts (BA) in Health, Exercise And Sport Sciences in 2014, she moved to Hawaii where she was introduced to Brazilian jiu-jitsu through her uncle Jay Thompson an MMA promoter. She joined K team Martial Arts Academy (a Relson Gracie Academy affiliate) and started competing, training under Robert Drysdale and Egan Inoue. After less than a year of training, she was promoted to blue belt.

In 2016 she met Robert “Cyborg” Abreu during a training camp, she then joined his academy Fight Sports in Miami Florida. She became World champion three years in a row winning a World title at every belt level in both Gi and No-Gi. In February 2019, Grindatti came second at the ADCC North American Trials in the +60 kg (132.3 lb) division after defeating Monique Ricardo in quarter-finals, N. Evangelista in the semi-finals but losing to Amanda Leve in the final. In November 2019, Abeu proposed to Grindatti, They split in 2023.

After splitting from Cyborg, Grindatti continued to train and manage Fight Sports, before being kicked out after beginning a relationship with Fight Sports athlete, Luccas Lira, whom she later married. She later opened her own strength and conditioning gym, Champion Fit, before opening Lira Jiu Jitsu with her husband.

== Black belt career ==
In December 2019, Grindatti was promoted to black belt by Abreu. In 2020 she won silver at the European Open Championship, the following year she won silver at the Pan No-Gi Championship the bronze at the IBJJF World Championship. In February 2022 she won her first major IBJJF title becoming European Champion after defeating Magdalena Loska and winning gold at the 2022 IBJJF European Open.

In April 2022 she participated to the ADCC West Coast Trials, she was defeated in the quarter-finals by Amy Campo. In 2023 she won gold in Absolute at the IBJJF Austin Winter International. After the tournament, Grindatti announced that she would be leaving Fight Sports and no longer represent the team. Grindatti competed under Vagner Rocha Martial Arts (VRMA) at Midwest Finishers 12 on 11 February 2023 in a 3 v 3 women's team tournament. They lost in the second round, with Grindatti drawing her only match.

Grindatti was then invited to compete in the women's under 66 kg grand prix at Polaris 23 on March 11, 2023. She lost in the opening round to Brianna Ste-Marie. Shortly after the tournament, Grindatti announced that she had moved to ATOS and would be representing them in competition moving forward.

Grindatti competed in the under 70 kg grand prix at Enyo Grappling 4 on September 21, 2023. She beat three opponents and won the tournament. Grindatti then entered the medium-heavyweight division of the IBJJF No Gi Pan Championship 2023 on October 1, 2023 and won a bronze medal.

Grindatti lost in the opening round of the IBJJF No-Gi World Championship 2023 and left her rashguard on the mat to signal her retirement from the sport.

=== Return ===
Grindatti returned to face Giovanna Carneiro at UFC Fight Pass Invitational 9 on December 5, 2024. She won the match by submission.

She will now face Helena Crevar at UFC Fight Pass Invitational 10 on March 6, 2025. She lost the match by submission.

== Championships and accomplishments ==
Main Achievements (black belt level):

- IBJJF European Open Champion (2022)
- 2nd Place IBJJF European Open (2020)
- 2nd Place IBJJF Pan Championship No-Gi (2021)
- 3rd Place IBJJF World Championship (2021)

Main Achievements (Colored Belts):

- IBJJF World Champion (2017 (Note: Weight and absolute) blue, 2018 purple, 2019 brown)
- IBJJF World Champion No-Gi (2016 blue, 2018 purple, 2019 brown)
- IBJJF Pan Champion (2017 blue)
- IBJJF Pan Champion No-Gi (2018 purple, 2019 brown)
- IBJJF American Nationals Champion (2016 blue, 2017 purple)
- IBJJF American Nationals No-Gi Champion (2016 blue, 2017 (Note: Absolute))
- UAEJJF USA National Pro Jiu-jitsu Championship - Gi (2018 purple)
- 2nd Place IBJJF American Nationals (2017 purple)
- 2nd Place ADCC West Coast Trials (2019)
- 3rd Place IBJJF American Nationals No-Gi (2016 blue)
