= Gustavo Batista =

Brazilian jiujitsu athlete

- Born: Gustavo Espindola Batista; March 11, 1996 (age 30); Florianópolis, Santa Catarina, Brazil
- Other names: Braguinha
- Weight: 204 lb (93 kg; 14.6 st)
- Division: Super-Heavyweight
- Style: Brazilian jiu-jitsu
- Fighting out of: San Diego, California, United States
- Team: Atos Jiu-Jitsu
- Teachers: Leandro Lo, André Galvão
- Rank: Black belt in Brazilian jiu-jitsu under Leandro Lo

Gustavo Batista (born March 11, 1996) was born in Florianópolis, capital of Santa Catarina in Brazil and he is a professional Brazilian jiujitsu athlete and two-time World Champion. He is currently representing Atos Jiu-Jitsu. He trained under the late Leandro Lo (d. 2022).

== Professional grappling career ==
Batista competed in the main event superfight at Third Coast Grappling Kumite 7 against Vinicius 'Trator' Ferreira on September 26, 2020, winning the match by decision. Batista was then invited to the middleweight grand prix at BJJ Stars 4 on November 4, 2020. He lost by advantages to Isaque Bahiense in the opening round. He also competed in a grand prix tournament at Third Coast Grappling 7 on June 19, 2021, losing in the opening round to Pedro Rocha. Batista defeated Aaron 'Tex' Johnson in a superfight at Fight 2 Win 176 on July 10, 2021. He thencompeted in the heavyweight division of the IBJJF Grand Prix 2021, although he went out in the opening round.

=== 2023-2024 ===
Batista won a gold medal in the medium-heavyweight division of the IBJJF World Championship 2023 on June 4, 2023. Batista also competed against Jansen Gomes in a superfight at BJJ Stars 11 on September 9, 2023. He lost the match 2–0 on points. He then competed against Isaque Bahiense in the co-main event of ADXC 1 on October 20, 2023. He lost the match by decision. Batista competed in the heavyweight division of The Crown on November 19, 2023. He won a silver medal in the division.

Batista competed in the medium-heavyweight grand prix at BJJ Stars 12 on April 27, 2024. He made it to the semi-final before losing on points to Uanderson Ferreira. Batista won a gold medal in the medium-heavyweight division of the IBJJF World Championship 2024 on June 1, 2024. Batista competed in the heavyweight division of the second edition of The Crown on November 17, 2024. He beat Joao Nicolite and lost in the final to Adam Wardziński, finishing with a silver medal.

=== 2025 ===
Batista then won a bronze medal in the absolute division of the IBJJF Pan Championship 2025.

== See also ==
- André Galvão
- Tainan Dalpra
- Alexandre Ribeiro
