= Ricardo Vieira =

Brazilian Jiu-Jitsu practitioner

- Born: January 9, 1979 (age 47); Rio de Janeiro, Brazil
- Division: Super Featherweight
- Style: Brazilian Jiu-Jitsu
- Team: Checkmat
- Rank: 6th Degree Black Belt in Brazilian Jiu-Jitsu

Other information
- Notable relatives: Léo Vieira and Leandro Vieira

Ricardo Vieira
Medal record

Representing Brazil

Brazilian Jiu-Jitsu

World Championship
| Gold medal – first place | 1996 Rio de Janeiro, Brazil | (Blue) |
| Gold medal – first place | 1997 Rio de Janeiro, Brazil | (Blue) |
| Gold medal – first place | 1998 Rio de Janeiro, Brazil | (Purple) |
| Gold medal – first place | 1999 Rio de Janeiro, Brazil | (Brown) |
| Gold medal – first place | 2000 Rio de Janeiro, Brazil | (Brown) |
| Gold medal – first place | 2001 Rio de Janeiro, Brazil | 64kg (Black) |

Brazilian Jiu-Jitsu

Pan American Championship
| Gold medal – first place | 2002 California, USA | -64kg |

Brazilian Jiu-Jitsu

Ricardo Alcantara Vieira commonly known as Rico Vieira or Ricardinho is a Brazilian grappler, a Brazilian Jiu-Jitsu Instructor, and Competitor. He was born on 9 January 1979. He is one of the Viera brothers (Léo and Leandro), who lead and fight for Checkmat.

== Early life ==
Ricardo first stepped on a jiu-jitsu mat at the age of five, joining the kids class of IBJJF Hall of Fame coach Romero Cavalcanti (Jacaré). Vieira also played football (soccer) at a high level, making the junior squad of the famous Rio de Janeiro club Flamengo, though an injury kept him from progressing further in this activity.

== Brazilian Jiu-Jitsu ==
Since beginning training at the age of five, Vieira's aptitude for BJJ shone through right from the get go. He won multiple won in the junior leagues, including the World Jiu-Jitsu Championship, a competition in which he won in every belt division he competed, from blue belt to black belt. He won the IBJJF World Championship as a black belt in 2001. In 2009 Ricardo made a reappearance to a BJJ competition in Stockholm, Sweden, winning the absolute division in the Stockholm BJJ Open. He also made another appearance in 2011 at the Brazilian National No-Gi Championship where he won the Master’s division as a lightweight.

== CheckMat Jiu-Jitsu Team ==
One of the most successful teams in contemporary Brazilian Jiu-Jitsu, CheckMat's worldwide headquarters is in Signal Hill, California. CheckMat was established in 2008 by Leo and his brothers. Since its creation, Checkmat has become one of the top teams in Brazilian Jiu-Jitsu. Team CheckMat is the 2008 and 2009 NoGi World Champion Team. Team Checkmat also came in first for the Brazilian Nationals (Gi) 2010 and Brazilian Nationals (No-Gi) 2010.
