= Checkmat =

Brazilian Jiu-Jitsu association

Checkmat Brazilian Jiu Jitsu
- 250
- Also known as: Checkmat BJJ
- Date founded: 2008
- Country of origin: Brazil
- Founder: Leo Vieira; Ricardo Vieira; Leandro Vieira
- Current head: Leo Vieira
- Arts taught: Brazilian Jiu-Jitsu
- Official website: www.checkmatjiujitsu.com

Checkmat is a Brazilian jiu-jitsu academy and team started in 2008 by Leo Vieira, who leads Checkmat with his brothers Ricardo Vieira and Leandro Vieira. It is headquartered in the Signal Hill neighborhood of Long Beach, California, USA.

== History ==
The team was established in 2008 following a break up between the Vieira Brothers and their previous team, Brasa Clube de Jiu Jitsu. The name "Checkmat" is derived from the chess term "checkmate" and the word "mat", being the surface on which Brazilian Jiu-Jitsu is usually practiced. The Vieira brothers saw similarities in the strategic and tactical nature of chess and Brazilian jiu-jitsu. Checkmat has a strong presence in the Rio de Janeiro favelas through Ricardo Vieira and his Projeto Cantagalo with fighters such as Jansen Gomes.

At the 2023 World Jiu-Jitsu Championship, Checkmat competitor Samuel Nagai won the Male -70 kg class. In 2023, Checkmat was ranked the #2 adult male team and #3 adult female team overall at the IBJJF World Jiu-Jitsu Championship. The team has been consistently ranked among the top-performing teams at major international tournaments including the IBJJF World, Pan, and European Championships.

In 2022, Leo Vieira was appointed as the first Grappling Coach for the UFC Performance Institute, reflecting the international recognition of Checkmat’s technical excellence.

Checkmat also has a notable affiliate program, with over 100 affiliated academies worldwide, including branches in Europe, the Middle East, Asia, and Australia.

== Notable members ==
A list of current and former members:

- Leo Vieira
- Ricardo Vieira
- Leandro Vieira
- Leka Vieira
- Marcus Almeida
- João Assis
- Lucas Leite
- Michelle Nicolini
- Nathalie Ribeiro
- Cláudio Silva
- Jackson Sousa
- Jansen Gomes
- Adam Wardziński
