= Léo Vieira =

Brazilian Jiu-Jitsu practitioner

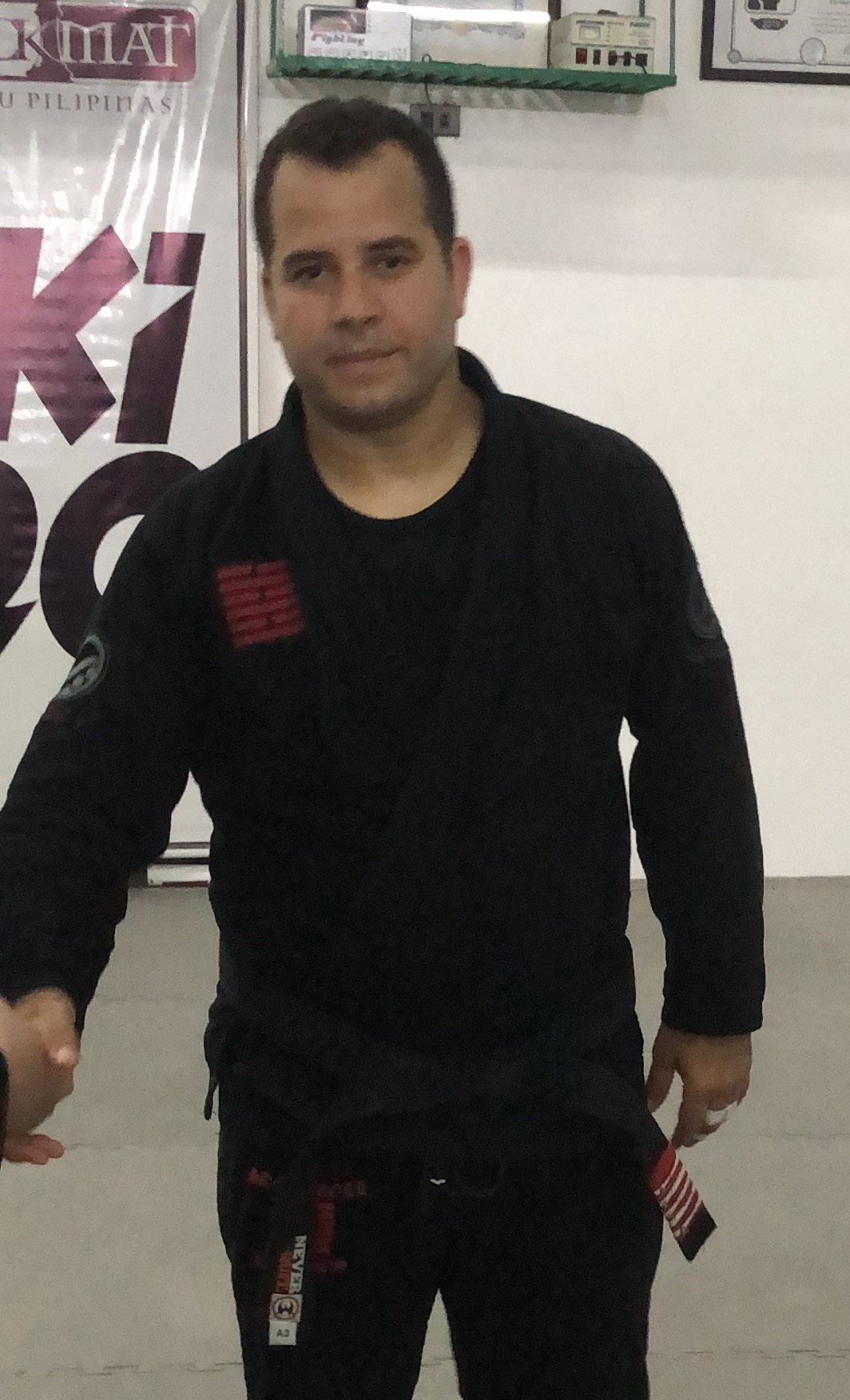
- Vieira in May 2019
- Born: March 23, 1976 (age 50); Rio de Janeiro, Brazil
- Other names: Leozinho
- Division: Featherweight
- Style: Brazilian Jiu-Jitsu
- Team: Checkmat
- Rank: 6th deg. BJJ black belt
- Years active: 1997–2013; 2017

Léo Vieira
Medal record

Representing Brazil

Grappling

ADCC
Gold medal – first place	2003 São Paulo, Brazil	-66kg
Gold medal – first place	2005 California, USA	-66kg
Silver medal – second place	2007 New Jersey, USA	-66kg
Silver medal – second place	2011 Nottingham, UK	-77kg

Brazilian Jiu-Jitsu

World Championship
Silver medal – second place	1997 Rio de Janeiro, Brazil	-76kg
Gold medal – first place	1998 Rio de Janeiro, Brazil	-76kg
Bronze medal – third place	2000 Rio de Janeiro, Brazil	-76kg

Brazilian Jiu-Jitsu

Pan American Championship
Gold medal – first place	2002 California, USA	-69kg
Gold medal – first place	2004 California, USA	-69kg

Leonardo Alcantara Vieira (born March 23, 1976) commonly known as Léo Vieira or Leozinho is a Brazilian submission grappler and Brazilian Jiu-Jitsu instructor.

He is the eldest of the Vieira brothers (Ricardo and Leandro), who lead and fight for Checkmat.

== Brazilian Jiu-Jitsu ==
Leo Vieira began training Jiu-Jitsu under Romero 'Jacare' Cavalcanti at the age of six. He has won numerous medals, such as the Brazilian Jiu-Jitsu World Championships, Pan American Championships and the prestigious ADCC world championships. After being on break from Jiujitsu Gi competition, Vieira competed again on July 16, 2017, at the age of 41. He competed in Absolute Championship Berkut Jiu-Jitsu 6 in Moscow and lost the fight via terra footlock. On September 25, 2017, Vieira competed in the ADCC against former Ultimate Fighting Championship title contender, Chael Sonnen in the absolute division. Vieira lost the fight via referee's decision. Vieira returned after more time away from competition at BJJ Stars 7 on November 6, 2022, where he defeated Cleber Luciano 8-0 on points in a superfight.

In 2022, Vieira was hired as the Vice President of Grappling for ONE Championship.

== CheckMat Jiu-Jitsu Team ==
One of the most successful teams in contemporary Brazilian Jiu-Jitsu, CheckMat's worldwide headquarters is in São Paulo, Brazil. CheckMat was established in 2008 by Leo and his brothers. Since its creation, Checkmat has become one of the top teams in Brazilian Jiu-Jitsu. Team CheckMat is the 2008 and 2009 NoGi World Champion Team. Team Checkmat also came in first for the Brazilian Nationals (Gi) 2010 and Brazilian Nationals (No-Gi) 2010.

== Career Achievements and Style ==
Throughout his competitive career, Vieira became known for his dynamic and creative style of grappling, often using unconventional movement and transitions to outmaneuver opponents. His approach influenced a generation of grapplers, particularly during the early 2000s when he stood out in international competitions such as the ADCC. Vieira is a two-time ADCC world champion, winning gold in 2003 and 2005 in the 66–76 kg weight class. He also secured a silver medal in the absolute division in 2003.

In addition to his athletic accomplishments, Vieira was instrumental in popularizing the use of wrestling-style takedowns and innovative guard passing in Brazilian Jiu-Jitsu competitions, making him one of the most technically respected athletes in the sport.

=== Coaching and Legacy ===
After stepping back from frequent competition, Vieira focused on developing new talent through CheckMat. Under his leadership, the team has produced several world champions including Marcus "Buchecha" Almeida, Lucas Leite, João Assis, and Michele Nicolini. Vieira's coaching philosophy emphasizes creativity, adaptability, and technical excellence, which has helped CheckMat maintain its status among the elite BJJ teams globally.

In addition to his work with CheckMat, Vieira frequently teaches seminars internationally and is widely regarded as one of the most effective instructors in the sport.

=== Personal life ===
Born in Rio de Janeiro, Vieira grew up in a family with a strong connection to martial arts. His brothers Ricardo and Leandro also became accomplished black belts and co-founders of CheckMat. Despite his competitive accomplishments, Vieira is known for maintaining a low public profile, focusing instead on his students and the growth of Brazilian Jiu-Jitsu. He is married and a father, often citing family support as a major factor in his success on and off the mats.

=== Teaching Style and Philosophy ===
Vieira is widely respected not only for his competitive achievements but also for his pedagogical methods. His teaching emphasizes adaptability, movement efficiency, and a deep understanding of leverage and timing. He is known for tailoring his instruction to the unique attributes of each student rather than enforcing a rigid system.

He has mentored numerous champions at various belt levels and remains actively involved in the curriculum development of CheckMat-affiliated academies worldwide.

=== Influence and Community Work ===
Beyond the competition mats, Vieira has contributed to the BJJ community by supporting social projects aimed at bringing martial arts to underserved youth in Brazil. He has collaborated with local initiatives that offer Jiu-Jitsu classes in favelas, promoting discipline and positive life choices through martial arts.

In his role at ONE Championship, Vieira also advocates for the professionalization of grappling as a spectator sport, helping create opportunities for athletes to earn a living from competition.

== Instructor lineage ==
Mitsuyo Maeda → Carlos Gracie, Sr. → Helio Gracie → Rolls Gracie → Romero Cavalcanti → Léo Vieira

== See also ==
- André Galvão
- Romero Cavalcanti
- Alexandre Ribeiro
