= 2009 World Professional Jiu-Jitsu Cup =

Brazilian Jiu-Jitsu competitions

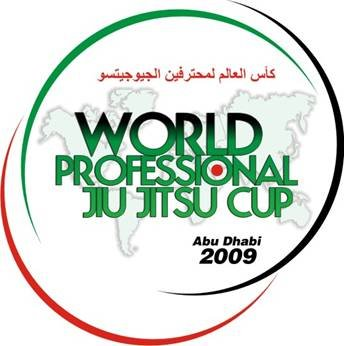
- Location: (United Arab Emirates) Abu Dhabi, UAE
- Dates: 01 – 02 May 2009

The 2009 World Professional Jiu-Jitsu Cup was the first international Brazilian jiu-jitsu tournament organised by the UAE Jiu-Jitsu Federation (UAEJJF) held in Abu Dhabi, United Arab Emirates.

== Results ==
Purple, Brown and Black Belts

Medal/Prize	(gold) Gold Medal + $7,000	(silver) Silver Medal + $3,000	(bronze) Bronze Medal + $1,000

Weight	Gold	Silver	Bronze
-65 kg	(Brazil) Rafael Mendes (BRA)	(United States) Rubens Charles Maciel (USA)	(United Arab Emirates) Tiego Fernandes (UAE)
-65 kg	(Brazil) Rafael Mendes (BRA)	(United States) Rubens Charles Maciel (USA)	(United States) Renato Tavares (USA)
-75 kg	(Brazil) Michael Langhi (BRA)	(United States) Marcelo Garcia (BRA)	(Brazil) Michel Maia (BRA)
-75 kg	(Brazil) Michael Langhi (BRA)	(United States) Marcelo Garcia (BRA)	(Brazil) Claudio Calasans (BRA)
-85 kg	(Brazil) Tarsis Humphreys (BRA)	(United Kingdom) Victor Estima (UK)	(United Arab Emirates) Paulo Ricardo Rodrigues (UAE)
-85 kg	(Brazil) Tarsis Humphreys (BRA)	(United Kingdom) Victor Estima (UK)	(Brazil) Zumbi Larara (BRA)
-95 kg	(Brazil) Antonio Peinado (BRA)	(Lebanon) Fadi Serhal (LEB)	(United Kingdom) Lúcio Rodrigues (UK)
-95 kg	(Brazil) Antonio Peinado (BRA)	(Lebanon) Fadi Serhal (LEB)	(Brazil) Braulio Estima (BRA)
+95 kg	(Brazil) Alexandre De Souza (BRA)	(Brazil) Gabriel Vella (BRA)	(Brazil) Lucas Sachs (BRA)
+95 kg	(Brazil) Alexandre De Souza (BRA)	(Brazil) Gabriel Vella (BRA)	(Portugal) Bento Ribeiro (POR)
Open	(Brazil) Tarsis Humphreys (BRA)	(Brazil) Braulio Estima (BRA)	(United States) Marcelo Garcia (USA)
Open	(Brazil) Tarsis Humphreys (BRA)	(Brazil) Braulio Estima (BRA)	(Brazil) Gabriel Vella (BRA)

=== White and Blue Belts ===
Medal/Prize	(gold) Gold Medal + $2,500	(silver) Silver Medal + $1,000	(bronze) Bronze Medal

Weight	Gold	Silver	Bronze
-63 kg	(United Arab Emirates) Tareq Al Kitbi (UAE)	(United Arab Emirates) Ahmed Saeed Al Nuaimi (UAE)	(United Arab Emirates) Ahmed Ghuloum Al Mazam (UAE)
-63 kg	(United Arab Emirates) Tareq Al Kitbi (UAE)	(United Arab Emirates) Ahmed Saeed Al Nuaimi (UAE)	(United Arab Emirates) Yaser Mohamed Al Qubaisi (UAE)
-68 kg	(United States) Pedro Torres (USA)	(United Arab Emirates) Mohamed Al Qubaisi (UAE)	(United Arab Emirates) Khalifa Al Shamsi (UAE)
-68 kg	(United States) Pedro Torres (USA)	(United Arab Emirates) Mohamed Al Qubaisi (UAE)	(United Arab Emirates) Talib Saleh Alkirbi (UAE)
-73 kg	(Brazil) Victor Silveira Santos (BRA)	(Brazil) Gabriel Tayeh (BRA)	(Spain) David Aranda (ESP)
-73 kg	(Brazil) Victor Silveira Santos (BRA)	(Brazil) Gabriel Tayeh (BRA)	(Bahrain) Ali Monfaradi (BHR)
-78 kg	(Brazil) Miguel Anka (BRA)	(United Arab Emirates) Majed Abdullah Al Naqbi (UAE)	(Jordan) Saad Qweder (JOR)
-78 kg	(Brazil) Miguel Anka (BRA)	(United Arab Emirates) Majed Abdullah Al Naqbi (UAE)	(United Arab Emirates) Ali Ahmed Al Menhali (UAE)
-83 kg	(Brazil) Jader Cabra (BRA)	(Bahrain) Ahmed Shabeeb (BHR)	(Jordan) Tamer Samir (JOR)
-83 kg	(Brazil) Jader Cabra (BRA)	(Bahrain) Ahmed Shabeeb (BHR)	(Egypt) Hattem Mattar (EGY)
-88 kg	(United Arab Emirates) Faisal Fahad Al Kitbi (UAE)	(Romania) Lifei Vali (ROM)	(Jordan) Yazan Janeb (JOR)
-88 kg	(United Arab Emirates) Faisal Fahad Al Kitbi (UAE)	(Romania) Lifei Vali (ROM)	(Brazil) Felipe Leal (BRA)
-93 kg	(Australia) Stefenn Krieg (AUS)	(Slovenia) Jaroslav Fedrosisin (SLO)	(Russia) Hakim Shomirzoev (RUS)
-93 kg	(Australia) Stefenn Krieg (AUS)	(Slovenia) Jaroslav Fedrosisin (SLO)	(United Arab Emirates) Abdulla Rashed Al Kitbi (UAE)
-98 kg	(United Arab Emirates) Yahya Mansoor (UAE)	(Egypt) Tarek Mattar (EGY)	(Kuwait) Fawzan Al Sabej (KUW)
-98 kg	(United Arab Emirates) Yahya Mansoor (UAE)	(Egypt) Tarek Mattar (EGY)	(United Arab Emirates) Mohammed Saleh Al Minhali (UAE)
+98 kg	(United Arab Emirates) Eid Reehan Obaid (UAE)	(United States) Danial McCormick (USA)	(The Bahamas) Alex Maldenado (BAH)
+98 kg	(United Arab Emirates) Eid Reehan Obaid (UAE)	(United States) Danial McCormick (USA)	(Japan) Hideki Sekine (JPN)
Open Light	(United Arab Emirates) Mohamed Al Qubaisi (UAE)	(Brazil) Gabriel Thaye (BRA)	(United Arab Emirates) Tarek Al Kitbi (UAE)
Open Light	(United Arab Emirates) Mohamed Al Qubaisi (UAE)	(Brazil) Gabriel Thaye (BRA)	(Russia) Zelim Khan (RUS)
Open Heavy	(United States) Daniel Colmick (USA)	(United Arab Emirates) Faisal Al Kitbi (UAE)	(United Arab Emirates) Yahya Al Mansoor (UAE)
Open Heavy	(United States) Daniel Colmick (USA)	(United Arab Emirates) Faisal Al Kitbi (UAE)	(Canada) Rodrigo Munduruca (CAN)

== See also ==
- IBJJF World Jiu-Jitsu Championship
- IBJJF European Jiu-Jitsu Championship
- IBJJF Pan Jiu-Jitsu Championship
