= 2010 World Professional Jiu-Jitsu Cup =

Brazilian Jiu-Jitsu competitions

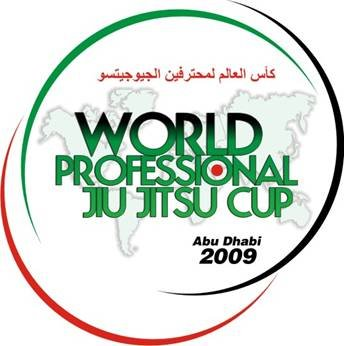
- Venue: Jiu Jitsu Arena
- Location: (United Arab Emirates) Abu Dhabi, UAE
- Dates: 15 - 17 April 2010

The 2010 World Professional Jiu-Jitsu Cup or Abu Dhabi World Professional Jiu-Jitsu Cup was the second edition of the international Brazilian jiu-jitsu tournament organised by the UAE Jiu-Jitsu Federation (UAEJJF) held in Abu Dhabi, United Arab Emirates.

== Results ==
Purple, Brown and Black Belts

Medal/Prize	(gold) Gold Medal + $8,000	(silver) Silver Medal + $3,000	(bronze) Bronze Medal + $1,500

Weight	Gold	Silver	Bronze
-65 kg	(Brazil) Rafael Mendes (BRA)	(Brazil) Guilherme Mendes (BRA)	(Brazil) Almiro Barros (BRA)
-65 kg	(Brazil) Rafael Mendes (BRA)	(Brazil) Guilherme Mendes (BRA)	(Japan) Kataniwa Katsunori (JPN)
-74 kg	(Brazil) Gilbert Burns (BRA)	(Brazil) Claudio Matos (BRA)	(Brazil) Michel Maia (BRA)
-74 kg	(Brazil) Gilbert Burns (BRA)	(Brazil) Claudio Matos (BRA)	(Brazil) Celso Vinicius (BRA)
-83 kg	(Brazil) Claudio Calasans (BRA)	(Brazil) Braulio Estima (BRA)	(Brazil) Delson Heleno (BRA)
-83 kg	(Brazil) Claudio Calasans (BRA)	(Brazil) Braulio Estima (BRA)	(Brazil) Guto Campos (BRA)
-92 kg	(Brazil) Alexandre Ceconi (BRA)	(Brazil) Romulo Barral (BRA)	(Lebanon) Fadi Serhal (LIB)
-92 kg	(Brazil) Alexandre Ceconi (BRA)	(Brazil) Romulo Barral (BRA)	(Brazil) Carlos Alexandre (BRA)
+92 kg	(Brazil) Ricardo Abreu (BRA)	(Brazil) Gabriel Vela (BRA)	(Brazil) Luiz Felipe Theodoro (BRA)
+92 kg	(Brazil) Ricardo Abreu (BRA)	(Brazil) Gabriel Vela (BRA)	(Brazil) Marcus de Almeida (BRA)
Open	(Brazil) Tarsis Humphreys (BRA)	(Brazil) Claudio Calasans (BRA)	(Brazil) Alexandre Souza (BRA)
Open	(Brazil) Tarsis Humphreys (BRA)	(Brazil) Claudio Calasans (BRA)	(Brazil) Gabriel Vela (BRA)

Open Weight Champion received an additional $12,000 bonus.

=== White and Blue Belts ===
Medal/Prize	(gold) Gold Medal + $3,000	(silver) Silver Medal + $1,500	(bronze) Bronze Medal

Weight	Gold	Silver	Bronze
-63 kg	(United Arab Emirates) Tareek Alkutbi (UAE)	(United Arab Emirates) Ahmed Gloum (UAE)	(New Zealand) Raymond Lee Massa (NZL)
-63 kg	(United Arab Emirates) Tareek Alkutbi (UAE)	(United Arab Emirates) Ahmed Gloum (UAE)	(Jordan) Ghaleb Odeh Ahmad (JOR)
-68 kg	(Brazil) Matheus Luckmann (BRA)	(United States) Jacob Sandoval (USA)	(United Arab Emirates) Talib Saleh (UAE)
-68 kg	(Brazil) Matheus Luckmann (BRA)	(United States) Jacob Sandoval (USA)	(United States) Kevin Mahecha (USA)
-73 kg	(United Kingdom) Daniel Agard (UK)	(Sweden) Daniel Svensson (SWE)	(United States) Issa Able (USA)
-73 kg	(United Kingdom) Daniel Agard (UK)	(Sweden) Daniel Svensson (SWE)	(Japan) Takatoshi Matsumoto (JPN)
-78 kg	(Jordan) Khlaed Abdulkareem (JOR)	(Guam) Jon Tuck (GUM)	(Jordan) Zaid Jarandoka (JOR)
-78 kg	(Jordan) Khlaed Abdulkareem (JOR)	(Guam) Jon Tuck (GUM)	(Iraq) Mario Marwan Kamal (IRQ)
-83 kg	(Australia) Kit Dale (AUS)	(United Arab Emirates) Gustavo Silvestro (UAE)	(South Africa) Faisal Alsouqi (ZAF)
-83 kg	(Australia) Kit Dale (AUS)	(United Arab Emirates) Gustavo Silvestro (UAE)	(Jordan) Wesley Charles (JOR)
-88 kg	(Poland) Krysztof Saganowsk (POL)	(United Arab Emirates) Majid Alnaqbi (UAE)	(Jordan) Tamer Sameer (JOR)
-88 kg	(Poland) Krysztof Saganowsk (POL)	(United Arab Emirates) Majid Alnaqbi (UAE)	(Jordan) Sami Mohamed (JOR)
-93 kg	(United Arab Emirates) Faisal Alkutbi (UAE)	(Brazil) Celso Frabetti (BRA)	(Norway) Brandon ROPATI (NZ)
-93 kg	(United Arab Emirates) Faisal Alkutbi (UAE)	(Brazil) Celso Frabetti (BRA)	(New Zealand) Ghaleb Odeh Ahmad (NZ)
-98 kg	(United Arab Emirates) Yahia Mansoor (UAE)	(Brazil) Marcelo Tarso (BRA)	(United Arab Emirates) Tarek Matar (UAE)
-98 kg	(United Arab Emirates) Yahia Mansoor (UAE)	(Brazil) Marcelo Tarso (BRA)	(United States) Orlando Sanches (USA)
+98 kg	(Japan) Hideki Sekine (JPN)	(United States) Willie Leonard (USA)	(United Arab Emirates) Mohammad Almenhali (UAE)
+98 kg	(Japan) Hideki Sekine (JPN)	(United States) Willie Leonard (USA)	(Canada) Alex Emond (CAN)
Open Light	(Guam) Jon Tuck (GUM)	(United Arab Emirates) Mohammed Naser (UAE)	(Bahrain) Ali Monfaradi (BHR)
Open Light	(Guam) Jon Tuck (GUM)	(United Arab Emirates) Mohammed Naser (UAE)	(Kuwait) Ahmad (KWT)
Open Heavy	(United Arab Emirates) Faisal Al Kutbi (UAE)	(Egypt) Tarek Mattar (EGY)	(United Arab Emirates) Ali Mehali (UAE)
Open Heavy	(United Arab Emirates) Faisal Al Kutbi (UAE)	(Egypt) Tarek Mattar (EGY)	(Japan) Hideki Sekine (JPN)

=== Female ===
Medal/Prize	(gold) Gold Medal + $4,000	(silver) Silver Medal + $2,000	(bronze) Bronze Medal

Weight	Gold	Silver	Bronze
-63 kg	(India) X.X. (IND)	(Brazil) Beatriz Mesquita (BRA)	(United States) Hillary Williams (USA)
-63 kg	(India) X.X. (IND)	(Brazil) Beatriz Mesquita (BRA)	(Brazil) Juliana Holanda (BRA)
+63 kg	(Brazil) Gabi Garcia (BRA)	(Brazil) Luzia Fernandes (BRA)	(Brazil) Cassuza Fornari (BRA)
+63 kg	(Brazil) Gabi Garcia (BRA)	(Brazil) Luzia Fernandes (BRA)	(Brazil) Rosangela Conceição (BRA)

== See also ==
- IBJJF World Jiu-Jitsu Championship
- IBJJF European Jiu-Jitsu Championship
- IBJJF Pan Jiu-Jitsu Championship
