= Rodolfo Vieira =

Brazilian mixed martial artist and Brazilian Jiu-Jitsu practitioner

- Vieria celebrating in a Brazilian jiu jitsu competition
- Born: September 25, 1989 (age 37); Rio de Janeiro, Brazil
- Other names: The Black Belt Hunter
- Height: 5 ft 11 in (180 cm)
- Weight: 185 lb (84 kg; 13 st 3 lb)
- Division: Middleweight
- Reach: 73 in (185 cm)
- Style: Brazilian Jiu-Jitsu
- Fighting out of: Orlando, Florida, United States
- Team: Fusion X-Cel
- Rank: Black belt in Brazilian Jiu-Jitsu under Julio Cesar Pereira
- Years active: 2017–present

Mixed martial arts record
- Total: 17
- Wins: 12
- By knockout: 1
- By submission: 9
- By decision: 2
- Losses: 5
- By knockout: 1
- By submission: 1
- By decision: 3

Other information
- Notable relatives: Ana Carolina Vieira (sister)
- Mixed martial arts record from Sherdog

Rodolfo Vieira (born September 25, 1989) is a Brazilian mixed martial artist and former submission fighter who is currently signed to the Ultimate Fighting Championship| (UFC).

A four-time Brazilian Jiu Jitsu World Champion, seven-time Abu Dhabi World Pro champion, two-time Pan American and European Champion as well as ADCC Submission Grappling World Champion, Vieira is regarded as one of the best heavyweight BJJ competitors of his generation. His sister is 4 x BJJ World champion Ana Carolina Vieira.

Having transitioned to MMA in 2015, Vieira joined the Ultimate Fighting Championship in 2019 where he competes in the middleweight division.

== Background ==
Born in Rio de Janeiro, Vieira started training under Arlans Maia when he was 13. A few years later as a purple belt he joined Gama Filho team (now Grappling Fight Team) under Julio Cesar Pereira.

== Grappling career ==
=== Early career ===
Vieira won the 2009 Abu Dhabi World Cup Brazilian north trials as a brown belt (in a mixed brown and black belt division). He won his division at the Abu Dhabi World Cup with a victory over two-time world champion Braulio Estima, whilst still a brown belt, this earned him the nickname "black belt hunter". After being promoted to black belt, injury sidelined him throughout most of 2010. He returned in 2011 winning his division and the absolute at the Pan American Championships also winning double gold at the Abu Dhabi World Cup and the IBJJF World Championships, facing Bernardo Faria in five out of the six finals. Vieira competed at the 2011 ADCC Submission Wrestling World Championship where he defeated Joseph Lee Blaize and Antonio Peinado but lost to Dean Lister, in the semi-finals (by heel hook).

=== World championship victories ===
In 2012 after winning double gold at the European Championships and the World Cup, he suffered a defeat to Marcus Almeida in the absolute quarter-finals of the IBJJF World Championship, Vieira won his weight class for a second time after defeating Xande Ribeiro. In 2013 he competed at the Copa Podio in Brazil, where he won his weight division and the absolute. He then competed at the Abu Dhabi World Cup, where he won his weight division but came second in the absolute after losing to Marcus Almeida.

At the 2013 IBJJF World Championship, Vieira retained his title in the −94 kg weight class but lost to Almeida in the final of the absolute. In 2014 in an effort to defeat Marcus Almeida Vieira put on more weight and moved up to the −100 kg weight class, at the 2014 Abu Dhabi World Cup he won his weight class defeating Luiz Panza in the final, but again was defeated by Marcus Almeida in the absolute final.

=== 2023 onwards ===
On December 11, 2020, Vieira returned to grappling competition to headline a Who's Number One event against Kaynan Duarte. Vieira was submitted with a rear-naked choke at 2:28.

Vieira faced Derek Brunson in the main event of ADXC 7 on November 17, 2024. He won the match by submission.

== Grappling style ==
Vieira's Jiu-Jitsu style includes a diverse set of techniques incorporating guard passing style with demanding physical exertion. His recurrent matches with Marcus Almeida have been noted among Jiu-Jitsu's rivalries.

== Mixed martial arts career ==
=== Early career ===
Vieira made his professional debut, as a light heavyweight, against Daniyar Zarylbekov at Arzalet Fighting Globe Championship 1 on February 10, 2017. He won the fight by a first-round rear-naked choke submission.

Vieira was scheduled to face Fagner Rakchal at Shooto Brazil 74 on August 27, 2017. He won the fight by a third-round submission.

=== Absolute Championship Berkut ===
Vieria made his ACB and middleweight debuts against Alexander Neufang at ACB 82 on March 9, 2018. Vieria won the fight by a first-round technical knockout.

Vieria made his second appearance with the promotion against Jacob Holyman-Tague at ACB 88 on June 16, 2018. He won the fight by a first-round submission.

Vieria was scheduled to face Vitaliy Nemchinov at ACA 96 on June 8, 2019. Vieria won the fight by a first-round submission.

=== Ultimate Fighting Championship ===
Vieira was signed by the UFC in June 2019.

Vieira made his debut at UFC, facing Oskar Piechota, at UFC Fight Night 156 on August 10, 2019. He won the fight via an arm-triangle submission in round two.

Vieira faced Saparbek Safarov on March 7, 2020, at UFC 248. He again won the fight via an arm-triangle submission in the first round.

Vieira was scheduled to face Markus Perez on October 11, 2020 at UFC Fight Night 179. However, on September 21, Vieira pulled out due to rib injury that was sustained in training, forcing him to rest and not be able to prepare for the fight.

Vieira was scheduled to face Anthony Hernandez on January 16, 2021, at UFC on ABC 1. However, Hernandez pulled out due to a positive COVID-19 test and they were rescheduled for UFC 258 on February 13, 2021. After a competitive first round Vieira became fatigued and was submitted via guillotine choke in round two. After the loss, Vieira vowed to fix his cardio issues.

Vieira faced Dustin Stoltzfus on July 17, 2021, at UFC on ESPN 26. He won the fight via rear-naked choke submission in round three. This win earned him the Performance of the Night award. Shortly after the fight, Vieira began working with Mano Santana, Lyoto Machida's Karate coach, to improve his striking.

Vieira was scheduled to face Wellington Turman on January 22, 2022, at UFC 270. However, after Vieira was forced to withdraw for medical reasons, the bout was cancelled. It was revealed after his withdrawal that Vieira had to undergo a cerebral angiography to determine if he would be able to continue fighting professionally, and he was cleared to continue.

Vieira faced Chris Curtis on June 25, 2022, at UFC on ESPN 38. He lost the fight via unanimous decision.

Vieira was scheduled to face Cody Brundage on November 19, 2022, at UFC Fight Night 215. However, Vieira pull out from the event due to undisclosed reason and the bout was scrapped.

Vieira faced Cody Brundage at UFC on ESPN: Song vs. Simón on April 29, 2023. He won the fight via submission in round two. This win earned him his the Performance of the Night bonus award.

Vieira was scheduled to face Armen Petrosyan at UFC Fight Night 231 on November 4, 2023. However the bout was scrapped after Petrosyan fell ill backstage during the event. The pair was rebooked for UFC Fight Night 236 on February 10, 2024. He won the bout by submission due to an arm-triangle choke with seconds remaining in the first round. This fight earned him another Performance of the Night award.

Vieira was scheduled to face Jacob Malkoun on February 15, 2025, at UFC Fight Night 251. However, Malkoun withdrew from the fight due to an undisclosed injury and was replaced by Andre Petroski. He lost the fight by unanimous decision.

Vieira faced Tresean Gore on August 2, 2025, at UFC on ESPN 71. At the weigh-ins, Gore weighed in at 189.5 pounds, three and a half pounds over the middleweight non-title fight limit, so the bout proceeded as a catchweight bout with 25 percent of Gore's purse going to Vieira. He won the fight by unanimous decision.

Vieira faced Bo Nickal on November 15, 2025, at UFC 322. He lost the fight by head kick knockout in the third round.

Vieira faced Eric McConico on April 25, 2026, at UFC Fight Night 274. He lost the fight via unanimous decision.

Vieira faced Robert Bryczek on September 26, 2026 at UFC Fight Night 289. He won the fight by unanimous decision.

== Championships and accomplishments ==
=== Mixed martial arts ===
- Ultimate Fighting Championship
  - Performance of the Night (three times) vs. Dustin Stoltzfus, Cody Brundage and Armen Petrosyan
  - Most arm-triangle submissions in UFC history (4)

=== Grappling ===
- IBJJF
  - IBJJF World Champion (weight and absolute weight classes) (2014/2013/2012/2011).
  - IBJJF Pans Champion (weight and absolute weight classes) Champion (2011)
  - IBJJF European Open Champion (weight and absolute weight classes) (2012)
  - IBJJF World Championship Runner-up (absolute weight class) (2014/2013/2012)
- ADCC
  - ADCC Champion (2015)
  - Copa Pódio
  - Copa Pódio Champion (2014/2013)
  - IBJJF Europea
  - IBJJF European Open Champion (weight and absolute weight classes)(2012)
  - UAEJJF Abu Dhabi
  - UAEJJF Abu Dhabi World Pro Champion (absolute weight class)(2014)
  - UAEJJF Abu Dhabi World Pro Champion (weight and absolute weight classes)(2012/2011)
  - CBJJ Brazilian
  - CBJJ Brazilian Champion (weight and absolute weight classes)(2008 purple belt)
  - CBJJ Brazilian Champion (weight and absolute weight classes) (2007 blue belt)

== Mixed martial arts record ==
Professional record breakdown
17 matches	12 wins	5 losses
By knockout	1	1
By submission	9	1
By decision	2	3

Res.	Record	Opponent	Method	Event	Date	Round	Time	Location	Notes
Win	12–5	Robert Bryczek	Decision (unanimous)	UFC Fight Night: Rosas Jr. vs. Barcelos	26 September 2026	3	5:00	Las Vegas, Nevada, United States	
Loss	11–5	Eric McConico	Decision (unanimous)	UFC Fight Night: Sterling vs. Zalal	25 April 2026	3	5:00	Las Vegas, Nevada, United States	
Loss	11–4	Bo Nickal	KO (head kick)	UFC 322	15 November 2025	3	2:24	New York City, New York, United States	
Win	11–3	Tresean Gore	Decision (unanimous)	UFC on ESPN: Taira vs. Park	2 August 2025	3	5:00	Las Vegas, Nevada, United States	Catchweight (189.5 lb) bout; Gore missed weight.
Loss	10–3	Andre Petroski	Decision (unanimous)	UFC Fight Night: Cannonier vs. Rodrigues	15 February 2025	3	5:00	Las Vegas, Nevada, United States	
Win	10–2	Armen Petrosyan	Submission (arm-triangle choke)	UFC Fight Night: Hermansson vs. Pyfer	10 February 2024	1	4:48	Las Vegas, Nevada, United States	Performance of the Night.
Win	9–2	Cody Brundage	Submission (arm-triangle choke)	UFC on ESPN: Song vs. Simón	29 April 2023	2	1:28	Las Vegas, Nevada, United States	Performance of the Night.
Loss	8–2	Chris Curtis	Decision (unanimous)	UFC on ESPN: Tsarukyan vs. Gamrot	25 June 2022	3	5:00	Las Vegas, Nevada, United States	
Win	8–1	Dustin Stoltzfus	Submission (rear-naked choke)	UFC on ESPN: Makhachev vs. Moisés	17 July 2021	3	1:54	Las Vegas, Nevada, United States	Performance of the Night.
Loss	7–1	Anthony Hernandez	Submission (guillotine choke)	UFC 258	13 February 2021	2	1:53	Las Vegas, Nevada, United States	
Win	7–0	Saparbek Safarov	Submission (arm-triangle choke)	UFC 248	7 March 2020	1	2:58	Las Vegas, Nevada, United States	
Win	6–0	Oskar Piechota	Submission (arm-triangle choke)	UFC Fight Night: Shevchenko vs. Carmouche 2	10 August 2019	2	4:26	Montevideo, Uruguay	
Win	5–0	Vitaliy Nemchinov	Submission (rear-naked choke)	ACA 96	8 June 2019	1	2:01	Łódź, Poland	
Win	4–0	Jacob Holyman-Tague	Submission (rear-naked choke)	ACB 88	16 June 2018	1	3:51	Brisbane, Australia	
Win	3–0	Alexander Neufang	TKO (punches)	ACB 82	9 March 2018	1	3:42	São Paulo, Brazil	Middleweight debut.
Win	2–0	Fagner Rakchal	Submission (arm-triangle choke)	Shooto Brazil 74	27 August 2017	3	4:47	Rio de Janeiro, Brazil	
Win	1–0	Daniyar Zarylbekov	Submission (rear-naked choke)	Arzalet Fighting 1	10 February 2017	1	2:27	São Paulo, Brazil	Light Heavyweight debut.

== Grappling record ==
Professional record breakdown
110 matches	100 wins	9 losses
By submission	68	1
By decision	31	8
By disqualification	1	0
Draws	1	

Result	Opponent	Method	Event	Division	Type	Year
Win	(Brazil) Mahamed Aly	Points	Black Belt CBD	−100 kg	Gi	2018
Win	(Australia) Kit Dale	Submission	Black Belt CBD	−100 kg	Gi	2018
Loss	(Brazil) João Gabriel Rocha	opened the fight	ADCC World Championship	Absolute	Nogi	2015
Win	(United States) Rafael Lovato Jr.	Points (5–0)	ADCC World Championship	Absolute	Nogi	2015
Win	(United States) Benson Henderson	Submission (kimura)	ADCC World Championship	Absolute	Nogi	2015
Win	(Brazil) Felipe Pena	Referee Decision	ADCC World Championship	−99 kg	Nogi	2015
Win	(Brazil) Xande Ribeiro	Points	ADCC World Championship	−99 kg	Nogi	2015
Win	(Brazil) Cassio Silva	Points	ADCC World Championship	−99 kg	Nogi	2015
Win	(United States) Adam Sachnoff	Submission (armbar)	ADCC World Championship	−99 kg	Nogi	2015
Loss	(Brazil) Marcus Almeida	Points (0–2)	World Championship	Absolute	Gi	2014
Win	(Brazil) Bernardo Faria	Submission (armbar)	World Championship	Super Heavyweight	Gi	2014
Win	(Brazil) Leo Nogueira	Submission (arm-triangle choke)	World Championship	Super Heavyweight	Gi	2014
Win	(United States) James Puepolo	Submission (choke)	World Championship	Super Heavyweight	Gi	2014
Win	(United States) Harlan Berk	Submission (choke)	World Championship	Super Heavyweight	Gi	2014
Win	(Brazil) Bernardo Faria	Submission (wrist lock)	World Championship	Absolute	Gi	2014
Win	(Denmark) Alexander Trans	Submission (choke)	World Championship	Absolute	Gi	2014
Win	(United States) Sean Roberts	Submission (choke)	World Championship	Absolute	Gi	2014
Win	(United States) AJ Agazarm	Submission (choke)	World Championship	Absolute	Gi	2014
Loss	(Brazil) Marcus Almeida	Points (0–2)	World Cup	Absolute	Gi	2014
Win	(Brazil) André Galvão	Submission (ezequiel choke)	World Cup	Absolute	Gi	2014
Win	(Brazil) Leandro Lo	Submission (bow & arrow choke)	World Cup	Absolute	Gi	2014
Win	(Brazil) Luiz Panza	Submission (choke)	World Cup	Absolute	Gi	2014
Win	(Brazil) Luiz Panza	Submission (armbar)	World Cup	Super Heavyweight	Gi	2014
Win	(Brazil) Lucio Rodrigues	Points (7–0)	World Cup	Super Heavyweight	Gi	2014
Win	(Brazil) Antonio Braga Neto	Submission (armbar)	World Cup	Super Heavyweight	Gi	2014
Win	(United Kingdom) Luke Costello	Submission (bow & arrow choke)	World Cup	Super Heavyweight	Gi	2014
Win	(Brazil) Leandro Lo	Submission (choke)	Copa Podio	Absolute	Gi	2014
Win	(Brazil) Travis Stevens	Submission (choke)	Copa Podio	Absolute	Gi	2014
Draw	(Brazil) Leandro Lo	Draw	Copa Podio	Absolute	Gi	2014
Win	(United States) Alan Belcher	Submission (choke)	Copa Podio	Absolute	Gi	2014
Win	(United Arab Emirates) Faisal Alkitbe	Submission (choke)	Copa Podio	Absolute	Gi	2014
Win	(Brazil) Alexandre Souza	Submission (armbar)	Copa Podio	Absolute	Gi	2014
Win	(Brazil) Braulio Estima	Decision	Metamoris II	Superfight	Gi	2013
Loss	(Brazil) Marcus Almeida	Points (2–6)	World Championships	Absolute	Gi	2013
Win	(Brazil) Nivaldo Lima	Submission (choke)	World Championships	Heavyweight	Gi	2013
Win	(Brazil) Leo Leite	Submission (choke)	World Championships	Heavyweight	Gi	2013
Win	(Brazil) Yuri Simoes	Points (8–0)	World Championships	Heavyweight	Gi	2013
Win	(United States) James Puopolo	Submission (choke)	World Championships	Heavyweight	Gi	2013
Win	(Brazil) Leo Leite	Submission (armbar)	World Championships	Absolute	Gi	2013
Win	(Brazil) João Rocha	Submission (armbar)	World Championships	Absolute	Gi	2013
Win	(Brazil) Antonio Peinado	Submission (armbar)	World Championships	Absolute	Gi	2013
Win	(Brazil) Lucas Sachs	Submission (armbar)	World Championships	Absolute	Gi	2013
Win	(Brazil) Ricardo Abreu	Advantages (3–0)	Copa Podio	Superfight	Gi	2013
Win	(Brazil) Leo Leite	Submission (armbar)	Copa Podio	Superfight	Gi	2013
Loss	(Brazil) Marcus Almeida	Points (2–7)	World Cup	Absolute	Gi	2013
Win	(Brazil) Claudio Calasans	Points (9–0)	World Cup	Absolute	Gi	2013
Win	(Brazil) Pedro Peres	Submission (bow & arrow choke)	World Cup	Heavyweight	Gi	2013
Win	(Brazil) Roberto Alencar	Points (11–0)	World Cup	Heavyweight	Gi	2013
Win	(Brazil) Rodrigo Ribeiro	Submission (triangle choke)	World Cup	Heavyweight	Gi	2013
Win	(Brazil) Pedro Henrique	Submission (ezekiel choke)	World Cup Brazilian Trials	Heavyweight	Gi	2013
Win	(Brazil) Leo Nogueira	Advantages (3–1)	Copa Podio	Absolute	Gi	2013
Win	(Brazil) Alexandre Souza	Submission (armbar)	Copa Podio	Absolute	Gi	2013
Win	(Brazil) Xande Ribeiro	Advantages (6–0)	Copa Podio	Absolute	Gi	2013
Win	(United States) Keenan Cornelius	Points (10–0)	Copa Podio	Absolute	Gi	2013
Win	(Brazil) Leo Nogueira	Points (9–0)	Copa Podio	Absolute	Gi	2013
Win	(Brazil) Alexandre Ceconi	Submission (choke)	Copa Podio	Absolute	Gi	2013
Win	(Brazil) Kim Terra	Submission (armbar)	Rockstrike	Absolute	Gi	2012
Win	(Brazil) Gilmar Oliveira	Submission (choke)	Rockstrike	Absolute	Gi	2012
Win	(Brazil) Tarsis Humphreys	Points (16–0)	Rockstrike	Absolute	Gi	2012
Win	(Brazil) Luciano Gonçalves	Submission (armbar)	Rockstrike	Absolute	Gi	2012
Win	(Brazil) Luis Roberto Pereira	Submission (armbar)	Rockstrike	Absolute	Gi	2012
Win	(Brazil) Enrico Wesley	Submission (choke)	Brazil. Teams	Heavyweight	Gi	2012
Win	(Brazil) Kinter Moura	Submission (armbar)	Brazil. Teams	Heavyweight	Gi	2012
Win	(Brazil) Xande Ribeiro	Advantages (4–0)	World Championships	Heavyweight	Gi	2012
Win	(Brazil) Alexandre Ceconi	Submission (choke)	World Championships	Heavyweight	Gi	2012
Win	(Brazil) Fabiano Souza	Submission (armbar)	World Championships	Heavyweight	Gi	2012
Win	(Brazil) Alan Salgado	Submission (cross choke)	World Championships	Heavyweight	Gi	2012
Loss	(Brazil) Marcus Almeida	Points (7–8)	World Championships	Absolute	Gi	2012
Win	(United States) James Puopolo	Submission (choke)	World Championships	Absolute	Gi	2012
Win	(Brazil) Diego Vivaldi	Submission (cross choke)	World Championships	Absolute	Gi	2012
Win	(Brazil) André Galvão	Points (4–2)	World Cup	Absolute	Gi	2012
Win	(Brazil) Bernardo Faria	Submission (cross choke)	World Cup	Absolute	Gi	2012
Win	(Brazil) Marcus Almeida	Submission (bow & arrow choke)	World Cup	Absolute	Gi	2012
Win	(Brazil) Roberto Alencar	Submission (armbar)	World Cup	Heavyweight	Gi	2012
Win	(Brazil) Marcelo Bernardo	Submission (armbar)	World Cup	Heavyweight	Gi	2012
Win	(Brazil) Cristiano Carioca	Submission (choke)	World Cup	Heavyweight	Gi	2012
Win	(Brazil) Luiz Panza	Submission (armbar)	World Cup Brazilian Trials	Heavyweight	Gi	2012
Win	(Brazil) Luís Felipe	Submission (armbar)	World Cup Brazilian Trials	Heavyweight	Gi	2012
Win	(Brazil) Pedro Borges	Submission (armbar)	World Cup Brazilian Trials	Heavyweight	Gi	2012
Win	(Brazil) Otavio Countinho	Disqualification (knee reap)	World Cup Brazilian Trials	Heavyweight	Gi	2012
Win	(Brazil) Bernardo Faria	Points (7–0)	European Championship	Absolute	Gi	2012
Win	(Brazil) Roberto Tussa	Submission (ezekiel choke)	European Championship	Heavyweight	Gi	2012
Win	(Brazil) Paulo Tarcisio	Submission (choke)	European Championship	Heavyweight	Gi	2012
Win	(Brazil) Gabriel Kitober	Submission (choke)	European Championship	Heavyweight	Gi	2012
Win	(Brazil) Lucio Rodrigues	Submission (ezekiel choke)	European Championship	Absolute	Gi	2012
Win	(Brazil) Victor Estima	Submission (triangle choke)	European Championship	Absolute	Gi	2012
Loss	(United States) Dean Lister	Submission (heel hook)	ADCC World Championship	−99 kg	Nogi	2011
Win	(Brazil) Antonio Peinado	Points (5–0)	ADCC World Championship	−99 kg	Nogi	2011
Win	(United States) Joseph Lee Baize	Submission (armbar)	ADCC World Championship	−99 kg	Nogi	2011
Win	(Brazil) Bernardo Faria	Points (9–0)	World Championship	Absolute	Gi	2011
Win	(Brazil) Bernardo Faria	Points (3–0)	World Championship	Heavyweight	Gi	2011
Win	(United States) Rafael Lovato Jr.	Points (20–2)	World Championship	Heavyweight	Gi	2011
Win	(Brazil) Gybson Sá	Submission (armbar)	World Championship	Heavyweight	Gi	2011
Win	(United States) Dustin Denes	Points (26–0)	World Championship	Heavyweight	Gi	2011
Win	(Brazil) Marcus Almeida	Submission (armbar)	World Championship	Absolute	Gi	2011
Win	(Brazil) Sérgio Moraes	Submission (armbar)	World Championship	Absolute	Gi	2011
Win	(Brazil) Claudio Calasans	Submission (armbar)	World Championship	Absolute	Gi	2011
Win	(Brazil) Antionio Braga Neto	Submission (choke)	World Championship	Absolute	Gi	2011
Win	(United States) Matt Jubera	Submission (triangle choke)	World Championship	Absolute	Gi	2011
Win	(Brazil) Bernardo Faria	Points (3–0)	Pan Championship	Absolute	Gi	2011
Win	(Brazil) Bernardo Faria	Points (8–0)	Pan Championship	Heavyweight	Gi	2011
Win	(Brazil) Diego Herzog	Submission (armbar)	Pan Championship	Heavyweight	Gi	2011
Win	(Brazil) Leo Nogueira	Advantages (4–0)	Pan Championship	Heavyweight	Gi	2011
Win	(Brazil) Marcus Almeida	Submission (Choke)	Pan Championship	Absolute	Gi	2011
Win	(Brazil) Antonio Peinado	Submission (choke)	Pan Championship	Absolute	Gi	2011
Win	(United States) Dan Simmler	Submission (cross choke)	Pan Championship	Absolute	Gi	2011
Win	(Brazil) Rafael Mendes	Referee Decision	World Cup	Absolute	Gi	2011
Win	(United States) Rafael Lovato Jr.	Points	World Cup	Heavyweight	Gi	2011
Win	(Brazil) Rafael Mendes	Referee Decision	Nogi World Cup	Absolute	Nogi	2011
Loss	(United States) Rafael Lovato Jr.	Points	Nogi World Cup	Heavyweight	Nogi	2011
Win	(Brazil) Alexandre de Souza	Points (14–0)	Pan Championship	xxx	Gi	2010
Win	(Brazil) Antonio Peinado	Advantages (2–0)	World Cup	−92 kg	Gi	2009
Win	(Brazil) Braulio Estima	Advantage (1–0)	World Cup	−92 kg	Gi	2009
Loss	(Brazil) André Galvão	Points (0–8)	ADCC 2009 Brazilian Trials	−88 kg	Nogi	2009
Win	(Brazil) Ricardo Seixas	Submission (guillotine choke)	ADCC 2009 Brazilian Trials	−88 kg	Nogi	2009

== See also ==
- List of current UFC fighters
- List of male mixed martial artists
