= Micael Galvão =

Brazilian jiu-jitsu practitioner from Brazil

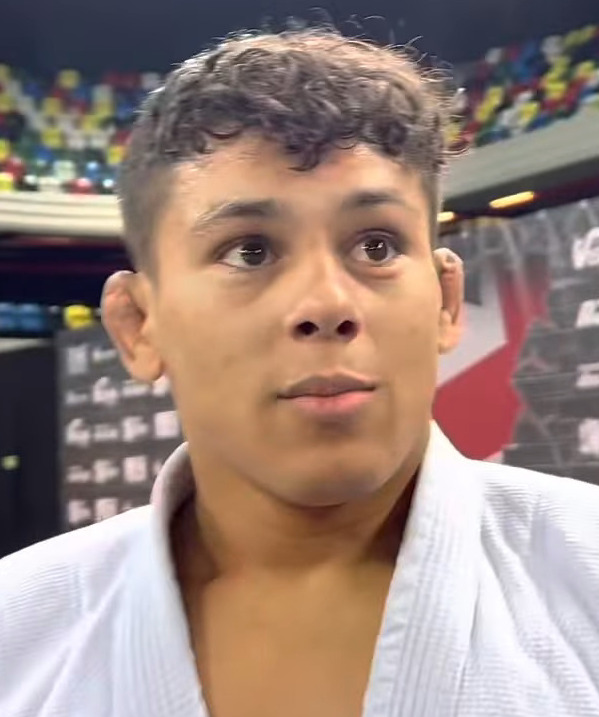
- Born: Micael Ferreira Galvão; 8 October 2003 (age 23); Manaus, Brazil
- Nickname: Mica
- Division: Lightweight / Middleweight
- Team: Melqui Galvao Jiu-Jitsu; Fight Sports (Note: Since 2021)); Dream Art / Alliance; Projeto Nandinho; Cícero Costha
- Trainer: Melqui Galvão, Totonho Aleixo
- Rank: 1st degree black belt in BJJ (Note: under Melqui Galvao) black belt in Luta Livre (Note: under Totonho Aleixo)

Other information
- Occupation: Submission wrestler; BJJ athlete

Micael Ferreira Galvão, commonly known as Mica Galvão, (born 8 October 2003) is a submission grappler, Luta Livre and Brazilian jiu-jitsu (BJJ) black belt competitor from the Brazilian state of Amazonas. A highly decorated athlete competing since childhood, Galvão was promoted to black belt in 2021, at the age of 17, less than three years after reaching blue belt. In 2022 Galvão won the 2022 IBJJF World Jiu-Jitsu Championship before testing positive for a banned substance, was stripped of said title and received a one-year suspension ban.

== Early life and education ==
Micael Ferreira Galvão was born on 8 October 2003 in Manaus, Brazil. His father Melquisedeque Galvão, known as Melqui Galvão, was the chief investigator of the special anti-kidnapping squad of the Manaus Police Department, and a Brazilian jiu-jitsu (BJJ) and Luta Livre black belt. (Note: Melqui Galvão was promoted to black belt in 2014) His grandfather was a well known kung fu instructor. Coached by his father, Micael Galvão's entered his first BJJ competition at the age of four. When he was 10, Galvão started training in Luta Livre Esportiva (also known as Brazilian catch wrestling). He also trained in judo and freestyle wrestling. In February 2011 his father began Projeto Nandinho (Note: The Nandinho project was initially called "Ferinhas do Jiu-Jítsu", the project was renamed "Nandinho" after one of the students who died in 2012.) at first in his garage, a program for low-income children and adolescents, looking to train in BJJ. It became part of Dream Art Project, a program for young athletes supported by Alliance Jiu Jitsu in Amazonas, Brazil.

Together with his sister Sammi, Micael Galvão quickly conquered all the main competitions in Amazonas and the rest of Brazil. At the 2015 Amazon Jiu-Jitsu Championship, at 11 he won via submission against all of his opponents, winning an Amazon Championship title for the 15th time. In July 2015 Galvão and his sister Brazil for the first time, to participate in the American National Jiu-Jitsu Championship in Las Vegas.

The Galvão siblings became known around the regional competition circuit for prevailing via submission against older and heavier opponents during "superfights". In one of the matches, Galvão, a green belt who was 13 won with submission against a 25-year-old brown belt competitor with a proven competition record. At 15, Galvão was promoted to blue belt, winning the 2017 IBJJF Kids Pan Championship; a month later, during the Copa Podio Orange League Event where juveniles face experience grapplers, Galvão won via submission against Leandro Rounaud, a former IBJJF Manaus Open adult black belt champion.

In January Galvão won the IBJJF European Jiu-Jitsu Championship in Lisbon, Portugal in the Juvenile, blue heavy division. In August 2019 Galvão won the Abu Dhabi International Pro Championship being held in Manaus, in the -81 kilograms (179 lb) juvenile blue belt division while his sister Sammi won the -70 kilograms (150 lb) female adult purple belt.

After turning 16, Galvão was promoted to purple belt, competing in the adult bracket he won the Abu Dhabi Grand Slam 2019–2020 – Abu Dhabi. Less than a year later, he was promoted to brown belt in October 2020. In April 2021 he won the Abu Dhabi Grand Slam 2020–2021 – Abu Dhabi in the -77 kilograms (170 lb) division. In May 2021 Galvão participated in Flograppling's Who's Number 1 (WNO), defeating World No-Gi black belt Champion and ADCC veteran Dante Leon by unanimous decision. In June 2021 it was announced that Roberto "Cyborg" Abreu's Fight Sports was partnering with Melqui Galvao's project in Brazil providing an exchange program between their headquarters in Miami and their Manaus location. Micael Galvão announced that he was now representing Fight Sports team going forward in competitions. Also in 2021 as a brown belt, he won the Abu Dhabi Grand Slam World Pro and the 2021 IBJJF No Gi Pan Championship in the middleweight division.

On 19 June 2021 Galvão entered the Third Coast Grappling 7 grand prix, prevailing against three BJJ black belts via submission in one night to win the title.

== Black belt career ==
=== 2021 ===
On 9 July 2021 a few months after being promoted to black belt in Luta Livre by his mentor Totonho Aleixo, and only nine months after receiving his BJJ brown belt, 17-year-old Galvão was promoted to BJJ black belt by his father Melqui Galvão at their academy. In October Micael Galvão won the Abu Dhabi Grand Slam 2021–2022 Rio De Janeiro, winning all his fights by submission. In November 2021, he became the youngest athlete to compete in the AJP World Pro championship at the male black belt level, then became the youngest competitor to win the event after submitting all his opponents in the 77 kilograms (170 lb) division.

After defeating Carlos Andrade at the prestigious Curitiba Open, a tournament featuring the top Brazilian competitors, Galvão held a record of 12 submission win in a row. In September 2021 Galvão lost a no-Gi match to Tye Ruotolo by Split Decision at the WNO Championship.

=== 2022 ===
In February 2022 Galvão won the Brazilian ADCC Trials submitting all of his opponents, scoring 6 wins, 5 submissions and 1 disqualification, and securing a spot at the upcoming 2022 ADCC Submission Fighting World Championship, the world's biggest grappling tournament, in the 77 kg weight class.

In April 2022, Galvão took part in BJJ Stars 8 Middleweight GP, one of the biggest and most prestigious professional jiu-jitsu shows in São Paulo; he won the first match against multiple-time black belt World champion Leandro Lo via decision, the semi-final against Mauricio Oliveira via submission (Injury Forfeit), and won in the final against Lucas "Hulk" Barbosa, a-two time World champion (Gi and No-Gi) whom Galvão defeated with a Bow and Arrow Choke.

In June 2022 competing at the World Championship as a black belt for the first time, Galvão became, at 18 years old, the youngest ever jiu-jitsu world champion after defeating 19-year-old Tye Ruotolo in the lightweight final. Galvão was later stripped of the title after testing positive for clomifene, a banned substance, and suspended for a year. He won silver at the 2022 ADCC World Championship after defeating Dante Leon, in a match where 2 points were deducted from Leon in the final 10 seconds; winning against Renato Canuto and Oliver Taza by points, but losing to Kade Ruotolo in the final.

=== 2023 ===
In January 2023, Galvão's father Melqui announced that they would be separating from Fight Sports and branching out as their own BJJ affiliation, including a new location in São Paulo. Galvão returned to gi competition for the first time in 9 months at the Abu Dhabi Grand Slam Tour in London on 12 March 2023, winning gold in the welterweight division. Galvão was booked to compete in a superfight against Alexandre de Jesus in the main event of Majestic BJJ 3 on 1 April 2023. Galvão won via submission against de Jesus in the main event and won the promotion's 83 kg title. Galvão was invited to compete in the BJJ Stars 10 Absolute Grand prix on 22 April 2023. He defeated Otavio Nalati on points in the opening round before winning his quarter-final match against Kaynan Duarte by disqualification. Galvão lost to Fellipe Andrew on points in the semi-final, although he was visibly injured from the previous match. Galvão had an MRI shortly after that which confirmed that he had suffered a medial collateral ligament injury and would be out of competition for a minimum of 8–12 weeks.

==== Doping ban ====
In April, Galvão was stripped of his 2022 IBJJF world title following an USADA announcement that he had tested positive for clomifene after a drug test conducted in connection to the 2022 World Jiu-Jitsu Championship. The USADA determined that Galvão's positive test was "caused by a medication prescribed in a therapeutic dose under the care of a physician" but that he failed to request a mandatory therapeutic use exemption. Galvão accepted a one year suspension starting on 22 July 2022.

==== Competition return ====
Galvão made his return to competition after recovering from his injury at the CBJJE São Paulo open 2023 on 29 July, winning a gold medal in the medium-heavyweight division. On 5 August 2023, he made his return to IBJJF competition by winning gold medals in the gi lightweight division and the no gi medium-heavyweight division of the IBJJF Vitoria Open 2023. He competed again at the IBJJF Floripa Winter Open 2023 on 12 and 13 August, winning gold medals in the middleweight division in both the gi and no gi.

Galvão competed in a 4-man tournament for the Who's Number One welterweight title at WNO: Night of Champions on 1 October 2023. He won both matches and was crowned the champion. He won the no gi middleweight division at the IBJJF Sao Paulo Open 2023 on 19 November 2023.

Galvão was scheduled to make his first Who's Number One welterweight title defense against Kody Steele at WNO 21: Ryan vs Barbosa on 30 November 2023. He won the match by submission, with a rear-naked choke. He announced after winning the match that he was going to make his second title-defense against Nicky Ryan at WNO 22 on 9 February 2024.

Galvão represented Team Modolfo in the under 83 kg division at AIGA Champions League Final 2023 on 13 and 14 December. He did not compete in the semi-final but won his final match by submission, helping Team Modolfo win the tournament.

=== 2024 ===
Galvão announced at the beginning of 2024 that he would move up to middleweight after defending his welterweight WNO title earlier in 2024. He won the IBJJF European Championship in Paris at middleweight on 27 January 2024. Nicky Ryan withdrew from a welterweight title-fight with Galvão at Who's Number One 22 and was replaced with Kenta Iwamoto. Galvão won the match by submission and retained the title.

Galvão won a gold medal in the middleweight division of the IBJJF Pan Championship 2024 in Kissimmee, Florida on March 24, 2024. He was booked to defend his Who's Number One welterweight title against Tommy Langaker at WNO 23 on May 10, 2024. He withdrew due to injury and was replaced by Andrew Tackett.

Galvão won the lightweight division of the IBJJF World Championship 2024 on June 1, 2024. The gold medal completed his IBJJF Grand Slam for the year. He competed against Davi Ramos in the main event of BJJ Stars 13: Vikings Edition on August 3, 2024. Galvão won the match on points.

Galvão was invited to compete in the 77 kg division of the 2024 ADCC World Championship on August 17–18, 2024. He won by submission over Luiz Paulo in the opening round, beat Oliver Taza and PJ Barch by decision, and prevailed by submission over Vagner Rocha to win the gold medal. That meant that Galvão in 2024, became the second person ever to achieve the sport's super grand slam. He competed in the men's absolute division, won via submission by Elder Cruz in the opening round and lost by submission to Dante Leon in the quarter-final.

=== 2025 ===
Galvão competed in the middleweight no gi grand prix at BJJ Stars 15 on April 26, 2025. He won all three matches and the title. He faced Jonnatas Gracie for the middleweight title in the main event of Who’s Number One 28 on June 13, 2025. Galvão won the match by decision.

== Brazilian Jiu-Jitsu competitive summary ==
Main Achievements (Black belt):

- ~~IBJJF World champion (2022)~~ (disqualified) (Note: Disqualified from those results see Doping ban)
- CBJJ Brazilian Nationals Champion (2022)
- BJJ Stars Middleweight Grand Prix Champion (2022)
- Third Coast Grappling Middleweight Grand Prix Champion (2021)
- ADCC Balneário Brazil Trials Champion (2021)
- AJP Abu Dhabi World Pro Champion (2021)
- AJP Grand Slam, RJ Champion (2021)
- 2nd place ADCC Submission Fighting World Championship (2022)
- 2nd place WNO Championship (2021)

Main Achievements (Coloured Belts):

- IBJJF Pan No-Gi Champion (2021 brown)
- AJP World Pro Champion (2021 brown)
- AJP World Pro Qualifier BR winner (2021 brown)
- AJP Grand Slam, AD Champion (2020 purple, 2021 brown)
- 2nd place WNO Championship (2021)

=== Main Achievements (Juvenile) ===
- IBJJF World Championship Juvenile Champion (2019) (Note: Weight and absolute)
- IBJJF Pan Championship Juvenile Champion (2019)
- IBJJF European Open Juvenile Champion (2019)
- IBJJF South American Championship Juvenile Champion (2019)
- CBJJ Brazilian Nationals Juvenile Champion (2019)
- CBJJ Brazilian Nationals Junior Champion (2015)
- BJJ Brazilian Nationals Teen Champion (2016)

== Instructor lineage ==
Carlos Gracie → Helio Gracie → Royler Gracie → Augusto Monteiro → Ronnie Melo → Melquisedeque Galvão → Micael Galvão

== Personal life ==
Galvão has said that his concern for animal welfare turned him into a vegetarian and that his diet plan has benefited his athletic performance.

He and Amit Elor, are engaged. Elor is the youngest American ever to win an Olympic gold medal in wrestling and win a senior title at the Freestyle Wrestling World Championships. In 2024, Galvão announced his intention to represent Brazil in freestyle wrestling at the Olympic Games.

In 2025, Galvão enlisted in the Brazilian national army and holds the rank of third sergeant.
