= Dante Leon (martial artist) =

Canadian grappler

- Born: May 6, 1995 (age 31); Harrow, Ontario, Canada
- Height: 5 ft 8 in (1.73 m)
- Weight: 82.3 kg (181 lb; 12 st 13 lb)
- Division: Middleweight -82.3 kg (181.4 lb)
- Fighting out of: Toledo, Ohio, US
- Team: Adamas Jiu-Jitsu; Pedigo Submission Fighting GFTeam
- Teacher: Dean Hersche
- Rank: BJJ black belt under Júlio César Pereira and Vitor Oliveira

Dante Leon (born May 6, 1995) is a Canadian grappler and Brazilian jiu-jitsu (BJJ) black belt competitor.

A multiple-time World and Pan No-Gi champion in the lower belts divisions, Leon is a two-time black belt IBJJF No-Gi World champion, three-time No-Gi Pan champion, American Nationals champion as well as a two-time ADCC Submission Fighting World Championship bronze medallist.

== Early life ==
Leon was born on May 6, 1995, in Harrow, Essex County, Ontario, Canada. He grew up playing ice hockey then was introduced to martial arts and boxing by his father when he was 6. Leon started Brazilian jiu-jitsu (BJJ) in Detroit, Michigan, from the age of 12. His first instructor was the late Dean Hersche. As a blue belt Leon won the IBJJF World Juvenile Championship twice (2012, 2013) the IBJJF Pans Championship and the IBJJF Pans Juvenile Championship.

After being promoted to purple belt Leon won the 2015 IBJJF Pans No-Gi Championship under the Gracie Humaitá/Ribeiro Jiu-Jitsu team. Leon then joined GFTeam under Abraham Marte and Vitor Oliveira. After getting his brown belt, he moved to Toledo, Ohio, to train full time. As a brown belt Leon won the World No-Gi Championship as well as Pan No-Gi. In 2017 he won silver at the IBJJF World Championship.

== Black belt career ==
=== 2017–2020 ===
In June 2017, Leon was promoted to black belt by Júlio César Pereira and Oliveira, that same year Leon won the American No-Gi Nationals and the IBJJF Pans No-Gi. At the 2018 World No-Gi Championship, Leon won bronze after reaching the semi-finals before losing to Hugo Marques. In 2019, he became black belt No-Gi World champion for the first time, after defeating Jaime Canuto 4x2 in the finals.

Competing in the KASAI Elite Grappling Championships, Leon defeated Edwin Najmi via rear naked choke on April 6, 2019, during Kasai Pro 5. On February 1, 2020, at Kasai Pro 7, Leon defeated Renato Canuto via points.

=== 2021–2022 ===
In 2021, Leon finished second of No-Gi World after losing to Marques by referee decision in the final. In October 2021, Leon announced he would be officially joining Pedigo Submission Fighting to compete under their banner.

At the 2022 ADCC World Championship, Leon defeated Magid Hage and Mateusz Szczecinski before losing to Micael Galvão in the semi-finals. He won the bronze medal match by defeating PJ Barch. In 2022 Leon became No-Gi World champion for the second time after defeating Carlos Henrique 2 points 0 in the final.

=== 2023 ===
On February 26, 2023, Leon won the middleweight division and the absolute division at the IBJJF Tampa International Open. Leon was then booked to compete at Who's Number One 18: Meregali v Marinho on May 18, 2023, against Ruan Alvarenga. Leon won the match, submitting Alvarenga with a rear-naked choke. Leon competed in the IBJJF Indianapolis no gi Open on June 18, 2023, and won a gold medal in the medium-heavyweight division.

Leon competed against Ethan Crelinsten for the vacant WNO lightweight title at Who's Number One 19 on August 10, 2023. He won the match by submission and became the new WNO lightweight world champion. Leon then entered the super-heavyweight division of the IBJJF No Gi Pan Championship 2023 on October 1, 2023, and won a gold medal. Leon then won the no gi middleweight division at the IBJJF Nashville Fall Open 2023 on November 12, 2023.

Leon represented Team Modolfo in the under 76 kg division at AIGA Champions League Final 2023 on December 13 and 14. He won his semi-final match by submission and his final match by submission to help Team Modolfo win the tournament. Leon was voted MVP of AIGA Season 2 as a result, and later won 'Male Grappler of the Year (No Gi)' at the JitsMagazine BJJ Awards 2023.

=== 2024 ===
Leon was booked to defend his WNO lightweight title against Diego 'Pato' Oliveira at Who's Number One 22 on February 9, 2024. He was submitted with a heel hook and lost the title.

Leon competed in the IBJJF No Gi Absolute Grand Prix on February 29, 2024. He beat Elder Cruz in the opening round before losing to eventual champion Kaynan Duarte in the semi-final. He then won a gold medal in the middleweight division and a silver medal in the absolute division at the IBJJF No Gi American National Championship 2024 on June 29, 2024.

Leon was then invited to compete in the 2024 ADCC World Championship on August 17–18, 2024. He lost on points to Elijah Dorsey in the opening round. Leon returned in the men's absolute division, where he beat Michael Perez and Micael Galvão before losing to Kaynan Duarte in the semi-final. He then beat Giancarlo Bodoni in the third-place match to win a bronze medal.

Leon faced Andy Varela at UFC Fight Pass Invitational 8 on October 10, 2024. He won the match by submission.

Leon competed against Ellis Younger at Polaris 30 on November 2, 2024. He won the match by decision.

Leon then signed a contract to compete for ONE Championship from 2024 onwards. He made his debut against Bruno Pucci at ONE Fight Night 26 on December 6, 2024 and won the match by submission.

Leon faced Tommy Langaker at ONE Fight Night 27 on January 10, 2024. He won the match via unanimous decision.

=== 2025 ===
Leon faced Tye Ruotolo for the ONE Championship welterweight title at ONE Fight Night 31 on May 2, 2025. He lost the match via unanimous decision.

Leon represented Williams Elite Team at the AIGA Champions League finals 2025, going 2-1 as Williams Elite Team finished in second place.

Leon then defeated Marcio Andre on points to win the under 76 kg title at ACBJJ 16 on June 19, 2025.

== Grappling competitive summary ==
Main Achievements as black belt:

- IBJJF World No-Gi Champion (2019/2022)
- IBJJF Pans No-Gi Champion (2019/2022)
- Kasai 170 lbs Champion (2020)
- IBJJF American Nationals No-Gi Champion (2017)
- 2nd place IBJJF World No-Gi Championship (2021)
- 3rd place IBJJF World No-Gi Championship (2018)
- 3rd place IBJJF American Nationals No-Gi (2017 (Note: Absolute))

Main Achievements as coloured belt:

- IBJJF World No-Gi Champion (2016 brown)
- IBJJF Pans Champion (2013 blue, 2016 brown)
- IBJJF Pans No-Gi Champion (2015 purple, 2016 brown)
- UAEJJF USA National Pro (2016 (Note: Weight and absolute) brown)
- 2nd place IBJJF World Championship (2017 brown)
- 2nd place IBJJF Pans Championship (2013 blue)
- 2nd place UAEJJF Abu Dhabi Pro (2016 brown)
- 3rd place IBJJF Pans No-Gi Championship (2015 purple)

Main Achievements (juvenile divisions):

- IBJJF World Juvenile Champion (2012 blue)
- IBJJF Pans Juvenile Champion (2012 blue)
- 2nd place IBJJF World Juvenile Championship (2012 blue)
- ONE Championship
  - 2024: Ranked #2 Submission of the Year vs. Bruno Pucci

== Instructor lineage ==
Lineage 1: Kanō Jigorō → Mitsuyo Maeda → Luis França > Oswaldo Fadda→ Monir Salomão → Júlio César Pereira → Dante Leon

Lineage 2: Kanō Jigorō → Mitsuyo Maeda → Carlos Gracie Sr. → Helio Gracie → Carlos Gracie Jr. → Adilson Lima → Vitor Oliveira → Dante Leon
