= Ana Carolina Vieira (fighter) =

Brazilian jiu-jitsu practitioner from Brazil

- Born: 19 November 1993 (age 32); Rio de Janeiro, Brazil
- Other names: Ana Carolina Vieira Srour
- Nickname: Baby, Carol
- Division: Medium-Heavy; −74 kg (163.1 lb); Middleweight; −69 kg (152.1 lb)
- Style: Brazilian Jiu-Jitsu
- Team: GFTeam; Aviv Jiu-Jitsu
- Trainer: Luanna Alzuguir
- Rank: 2nd deg. BJJ black belt (Note: under Julio Cesar Pereira)

Other information
- Notable relatives: Luanna Alzuguir (spouse); Rodolfo Vieira (brother)

Ana Carolina Vieira is a Brazilian grappler and Brazilian jiu-jitsu practitioner and competitor. A multiple-time World and Brazilian champion in the lower belts divisions, Vieira is a five-time black belt IBJJF World champion, four-time IBJJF Pan Champion, two-time Abu Dhabi World Pro Champion and European champion. She is the founder of Aviv jiu-jitsu.

== Biography ==
Ana Carolina Vieira was born on 19 November 1993 in Rio de Janeiro, Brazil. She started learning capoeira then Brazilian jiu-jitsu (BJJ) at the age of 14 but quit because of the lack of girls. She chose to return to BJJ at 17 after watching her brother Rodolfo Vieira compete.

== Grappling career ==
She started training under coach Gabriel Marinho winning as a blue belt in 2012 three major competitions: the Abu Dhabi World Pro trials, the World Championship and the Brazilian Nationals. As a member of the Grappling Fight Team, which also included female athletes such as Mayssa Bastos, Amanda Monteiro and Thamires Aquino, Vieira began training under head coach Julio Cesar Pereira. Vieira started winning championships at every belt levels. She was promoted to black belt in June 2016. The following year she became black belt IBJJF World Champion then in 2018 she won both Gi and No Gi Worlds. On 26 March 2023, Vieira won a fourth gold medal in the Medium-Heavyweight division of the 2023 IBJJF Pan Championship.

=== 2024 ===
Vieira competed at the second ADCC South American Trials 2024 on March 9, 2024, where she won a gold medal at under 65 kg and was invited to the 2024 ADCC World Championship.

Vieira defeated Amanda Leve, Bia Mesquita, and Helena Crevar to win gold in the under 65 kg division at the 2024 ADCC World Championship on August 17–18, 2024.

Vieira competed against Aurelie Le Vern at ADXC 7 on November 17, 2024. She lost the match by decision.

=== 2025 ===
Vieira will compete in the $100,000 four-woman bracket at Craig Jones Invitational 2 on August 30–31, 2025.

== Championships and accomplishments ==
Main Achievements (black belt level):

- 5 x IBJJF World Champion (2022 / 2021 / 2019 / 2018 / 2017)
- 2 x IBJJF Pan Champion (2021 / 2019)
- IBJJF European Open Champion (2017)
- 3CG Kumite 7 Grand Prix Champion (2020)
- 2 x AJP Abu Dhabi World Pro Champion (2018 / 2017)
- 2nd place IBJJF World No-Gi Championship (2018)
- 2nd place IBJJF Pan Championship (2021 (Note: Absolute))
- 2nd place IBJJF Women's Heavyweight Grand Prix (2023)
- 3rd place IBJJF World Championship (2022/2019/2018)

Main Achievements (Colored Belts):

- 5 x IBJJF World Champion (2016 brown / 2014 purple / 2013 (Note: Weight and Absolute) / 2012 blue)
- 4 x CBJJ Brazilian Nationals Champion (2016 brown / 2014 purple / 2012 blue)
- UAEJJF Grand Slam, Rio de Janeiro (2016)
- BJJ Brazilian National Team Championship (2012 blue)
- 2nd place CBJJ Brazilian Nationals (2014 purple)
- 3rd place IBJJF World Championship (2012 blue)
- 3rd place CBJJ Brazilian Nationals (2012 blue)

== Instructor lineage ==
Luis França > Oswaldo Fadda > Monir Salomão > Júlio César Pereira> Ana Carolina Vieira

== Personal life ==
Vieira is the cofounder with her wife Hall of Famer, 5 x IBJJF World champion and ADCC champion Luanna Alzuguir of Aviv Jiu-Jitsu, and the sister of multiple-time world champion and Hall of Fame Rodolfo Vieira.
