= Dante Leon =

Dante Leon may refer to:

- Dante Leon (martial artist) (born 1995), Canadian grappler and Brazilian jiu-jitsu black belt competitor
- Dante Leon (wrestler), a ring name of American professional wrestler Marcos Meza (born 1994)
