= Zarutsky =

Zarutsky or Zarutski (Russian feminine: Zarutskaya, Ukrainian feminine: Zarutska) is an East Slavic surname. Notable people with the surname include:

- Alexander Zarutsky, Russian professional association football official and a former player
- Anton Zarutskiy (born 1986), Russian rower
- Irina Zarutskaya (1908–1990), Soviet geomorphologist, cartographer and university professor
- Iryna Zarutska (2002–2025), Ukrainian-American murder victim
- Ivan Zarutsky (died 1614), Don Cossack leader, Russia
- Pavel Zarutsky (1868–1938), Russian and Soviet architect

== See also ==
- Zaruski
- Zaritsky
