= Fight Sports =

Brazilian jiu-jitsu academy and competition team

- Date founded: 2011
- Country of origin: US
- Founder: Roberto "Cyborg" Abreu
- Arts taught: Brazilian jiu-jitsu, Grappling
- Official website: fightsportsglobal.com

Fight Sports is a Grappling and Brazilian jiu-jitsu academy and team based out of Miami, Florida. It was founded in 2011 by multiple time world champion Roberto "Cyborg" Abreu. Fight Sport's competition team includes a number of jiu-jitsu's top competitors, including many ADCC qualifiers. Fight Sports is also an internationally known Jiu Jitsu affiliation with 32 schools worldwide.

== History ==
Fight Sports started as a Brazilian jiu-jitsu (BJJ) academy established in Miami in 2011 by six-time World No-Gi and ADCC champion Roberto "Cyborg" Abreu, one of the most decorated BJJ competitors in history. In July 2022, there were Fight Sports schools affiliates on four continents and over thirty schools worldwide.

In June 2021 Fight Sports announced partnering with Melqui Galvao's project in Brazil, providing an exchange program between their HQ in Miami and their location in Manaus, Brazil. 18-year-old Mica Galvão announced that he was now representing Fight Sports team going forward in competitions, just like most of the Melqui Galvao-trained athletes. One of the best represented teams heading to the 2022 ADCC World, in June 2022 the team announced having hired wrestler Pat Downey to prepare for the Championship. In January 2023 Melqui Galvao announced leaving Fight Sports to open his own academy in Jundiai, Sao Paulo, Brazil.

=== Sexual assault cases ===
In 2020, a BJJ black belt under Abreu and instructor at Fight Sports Naples, Marcel Goncalves, was accused of sexual assault by a student of his who was 16 years old at the time of the incident. Initially, Abreu drew heavy criticism for his handling of the claims and how he chose to comment on them before he eventually put out a further statement that denounced Goncalves' actions. Since then, Abreu has also been named in a civil suit on the same matter, where he and Fight Sports LLC were accused of "failure to properly oversee its trainers and instructors and its failures to properly care for vulnerable minors training at Fight Sports’ gyms." On June 17, 2023, a summary judgement was issued in the case that ruled in favor of Abreu and Fight Sports.

In 2023, a second sexual assault lawsuit named both Abreu and Fight Sports LLC, stemming from an incident concerning another affiliated gym. Mandy Schneider was allegedly sexually assaulted by Rodrigo da Costa Oliveira, the coach of Rockstar Martial Arts Gym in Frisco, Texas, in a hotel room. The lawsuit stated that Schneider told the managers of the gym, but they did not inform her parents or the authorities and instead ordered her to stay quiet. The lawsuit claimed that "The repeated failures of Roberto Abreu and Fight Sports to ensure the safety of underage athletes have fostered an environment ripe for such abuse."

== Notable members ==
A list of current and former members:

- Aaron "Tex" Johnson
- Sofia Amarante
- Fabricio Andrey
- Valdir Araújo
- Daniel Azevedo
- João Costa
- Cyborg Abreu
- Rodrigo Francioni
- Micael Galvão
- Marcel Gonçalves
- Maggie Grindatti
- Jacob Mackenzie
- André Porfirio
- Natasha Quiza
- Diogo Reis
- Ricardo Rezende
- Vagner Rocha
- Daniel Niño de Rivera
