= Zarzycki =

Zarzycki (feminine: Zarzycka) is a Polish surname associated with the noble Zarzycki family of Nowina coat of arms, as well as with Zarzycki coat of arms introduced in Kingdom of Galicia and Lodomeria. Russian equivalent: Zaritsky, Ukrainian: Zarytskyi/Zarytsky. Notable people with the surname include:

- Aleksander Zarzycki (1834–1895), Polish pianist, composer and conductor
- Ferdynand Zarzycki (1888–1958), Polish general and politician
- Jan Zarzycki (born 1949), Polish electronics engineer, professor of technical sciences
- Jan Piotr Zarzycki (1921–2005), Polish histologist
- Jerzy Zarzycki (1911–1971), Polish film director
- Krystyna Zielińska-Zarzycka (1924–2007), Polish journalist and politician, M.P.
- Wojtek Zarzycki (born 1982), Polish-Canadian retired footballer
- Zbigniew Zarzycki (born 1948), Polish former volleyball player
