= Zaritsky =

Zaritsky, feminine: Zaritskaya is a Russian and Zaritskyi/Zaritska, Zarytskyi/Zarytska Ukrainian surname. Polish-language equivalents: Zarycki/Zarycka, Zarzycki/Zarzycka. Notable people with the surname include:

- John Zaritsky (born 1943), Canadian film maker
- Joseph Zaritsky (1891–1985), Israeli artist
- Max Zaritsky (1885–1959), American union leader
- Mikhail Zaritskiy (born 1973), Luxembourgian footballer
- Oleksandra Zaritska, singer from Ukrainian band Kazka
- Osher Zaritsky, birth name of Oscar Zariski (1899–1986), American mathematician

== See also ==
- Zarutsky
