= Zaruski =

Zaruski, feminine:Zaruska is a Polish surname.

- Javier Zaruski (born 1991), Uruguayan submission grappler
- Mariusz Zaruski (1867–1941) was a brigadier-general in the Polish Army, a pioneer of Polish sports yachting, and mountaineer.
