= Javier Zaruski =

Profesional Martial Artist (Brazilian Jiu Jitsu)

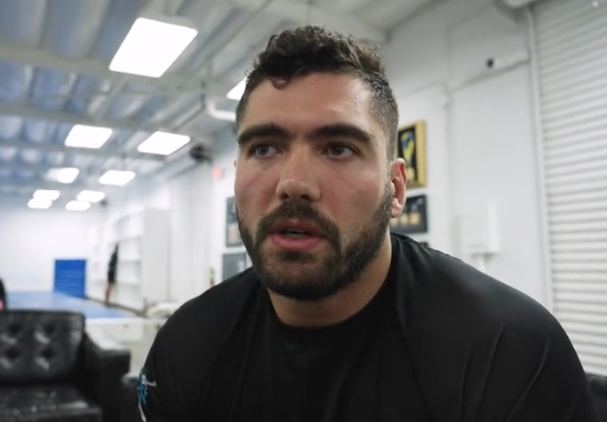

Personal information
- Nickname: The Warrior of God
- Nationality: Uruguayan
- Born: 23 August 1991 (age 35) Montevideo, Uruguay
- Height: 193 cm (6 ft 4 in)
- Weight: 215 lb (98 kg; 15 st 5 lb)

Sport
- Country: Uruguay
- Sport: Brazilian Jiu Jitsu/Submission Wrestling
- Weight class: Super-Heavyweight
- Rank: Black belt
- Coached by: Andre Galvao

Achievements and titles
- Highest world ranking: 1st (2023), Current IBJJF Super-Heavyweight No-Gi World Champion
Medal record
Brazilian Jiu Jitsu
World No-Gi Championship
Gold medal – first place	2023 Las Vegas	97.5kg
Gold medal – first place	2021 Dallas	(Brown) +100kg

Javier Zaruski Saul (born 23 August 1991) is a Uruguayan Brazilian jiu-jitsu comptetitor and submission grappler. He holds the rank of black belt in Brazilian jiu-jitsu under André Galvão. He is a multiple-time No-Gi World Champion and the current Super-Heavyweight No-Gi World Champion. He is the very first Uruguayan in history to ever win a black belt IBJJF No-Gi World title. Also he is the number one ranked Super Heavyweight in the World according to the International Brazilian Jiu-Jitsu Federation.

== Early life ==
Javier Zaruski was born on 23 August 1991, in Uruguay. His athletic journey began in football (soccer), where he played at a competitive level for teams such as Rampla Juniors and Club Sportivo Cerrito. Despite showing promise in football, Zaruski's career took a different turn when he discovered mixed martial arts (MMA).

Inspired by the UFC and the performances of fighters like Frank Mir, Zaruski decided to pursue a career in MMA. He initially trained at Scorpion, a mixed martial arts gym in Montevideo, Uruguay, where he developed a passion for grappling.

== Career ==
Zaruski was a prominent force in the colored belt divisions, winning multiple titles including the World IBJJF Jiu-Jitsu No-Gi Championship as a brown belt in Dallas, Texas.

=== Black belt career ===
As a Black Belt he captured double gold at the ADCC in Mexico City and the Super Heavyweight No-Gi Black Belt World Title (First and only Uruguayan in the history of the sport), where he submitted 4 of his 5 fights in his run for gold including a triangle choke submission in the finals against Vinicius Trator.

Zaruski competed against Victor Hugo in a superfight at Who's Number One 24 on June 20, 2024. He lost the match by submission.

Zaruski was invited to compete in the under 99kg division at the 2024 ADCC World Championship. He beat Henrique 'Ceconi' Cardoso by submission in the opening round and lost a decision to Roberto 'Cyborg' Abreu in the semi-final.

Zaruski competed at the ADCC in Mexico City on October 19, 2024. He won double gold with a perfect record finishing all of his fights by submission with 3 rear naked chokes and one arm triangle choke.

Zaruski is due to compete against Henrique ‘Ceconi’ Cardoso at ADXC 7 on November 17, 2024. He lost the match by decision.

Zaruski competed in the no gi absolute grand prix at BJJ Stars 16 on July 25, 2025. He was knocked out in the opening round.

== Championships and accomplishments ==
Main Achievements:

- 1st Place IBJJF World No-Gi Championship (2023)
- 1st Place ADCC Mexico City (2023) (Weight and Absolute)

Main Achievements (Colored Belts):

- 1st Place IBJJF World Championship NOGI (100% submission ratio in 2021) (Brown)
- 1st Place IBJJF American Nationals (2021 Absolute, Brown)
- 1st Place SJJF World Championship NOGI (2019 Weigh and Absolute, purple)
- 1st Place CBJJ World Championship NOGI (Absolute, Purple)
