= Cyborg Abreu =

Brazilian martial artist

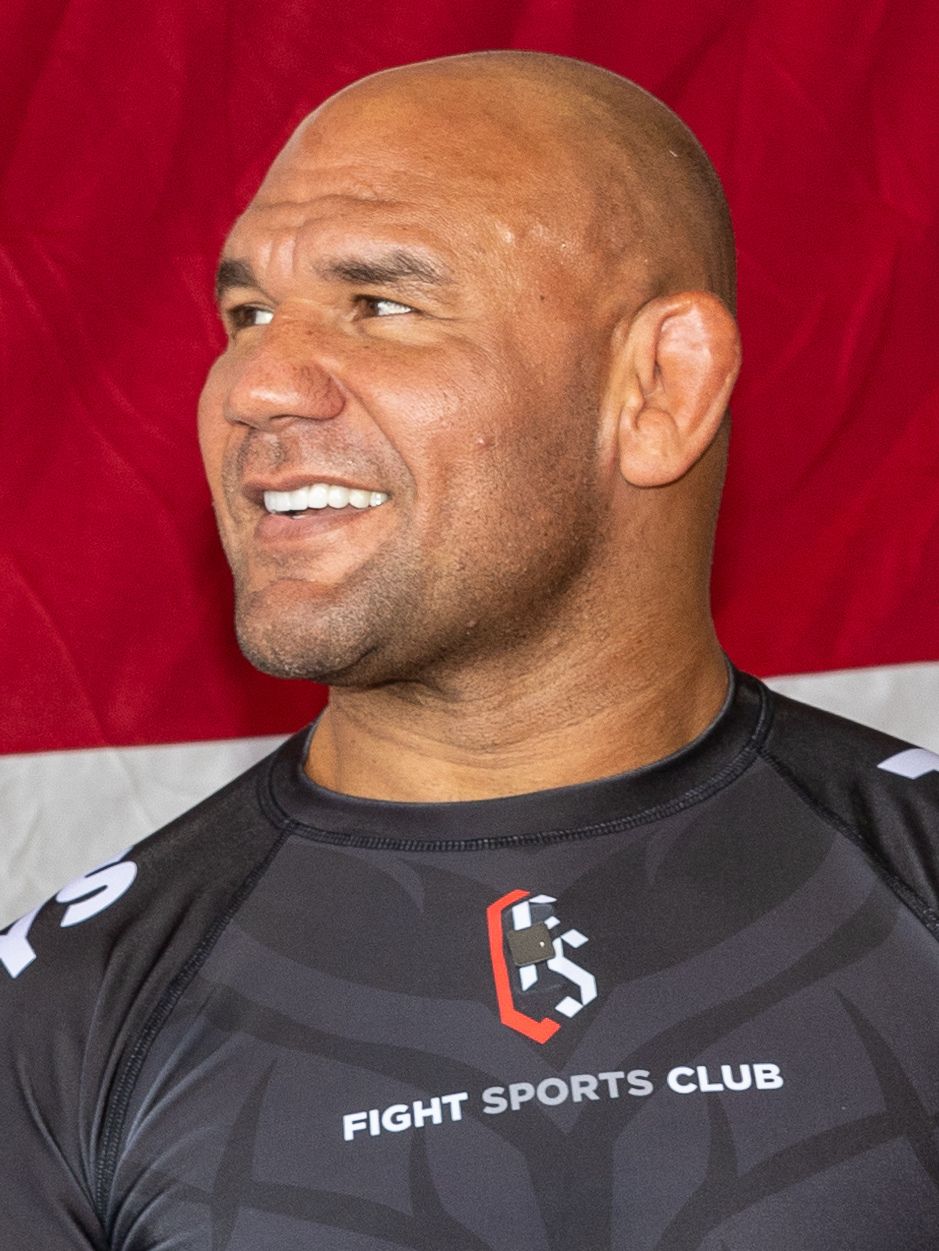
- Abreu in 2025
- Born: Roberto de Abreu Filho; December 20, 1980 (age 45); Campo Grande, Brazil
- Other names: Roberto de Abreu Filho
- Height: 5 ft 11 in (1.80 m)
- Weight: 222 lb (101 kg; 15.9 st)
- Division: Ultra-Heavyweight
- Style: Brazilian jiu jitsu
- Fighting out of: Miami, Florida, United States
- Team: Fight Sports Miami; Nova Geracao
- Teacher: Francisco “Toco” Albuquerque
- Rank: 5th degree black belt in Brazilian jiu jitsu

Roberto de Abreu Filho (commonly known as "Cyborg" Abreu) is a Brazilian submission grappler and instructor. A seven-time World No-Gi Champion, Abreu is known for the "tornado guard" position which involves inverting underneath the opponent and elevating them into a sweep.

== Grappling career ==
Roberto de Abreu Filho grew up in rural Brazil and was affiliated with Nova Geracao. In 2000 Abreu was in a car accident and was left with 300 stitches on his left arm. He was told that he wouldn’t be able to move his arm again but four months later he won silver at the Brazilian Nationals. His coach told him that only a cyborg could make a come back this fast. The name Cyborg then stuck with him.

Abreu is a very active BJJ competitor and coach, with multiple titles including gold medals at the 2010, 2011, 2012, 2017, 2019, and 2021 IBJJF No-Gi World Championships. He also won the ADCC Absolute title in 2013.

== 2022 ==
At the 2022 ADCC World Championship opening round, Cyborg Abreu lost by armbar to Haisam Rida.

=== 2023-2024 ===
On March 8, 2023, Cyborg was handed a three-year ban by the U.S. Anti-Doping Agency (USADA) after failing a December 20, 2022, drug test for using performance enhancing drugs at the 2022 IBJJF No-Gi World Championships. Abreu left the competition early and was tested off site. He tested positive for exogenous testosterone and metabolites (steroids). His suspension began retroactively on January 25, 2023.

Abreu was invited to compete in the BJJ Stars 10 Absolute Grand prix on April 22, 2023. He lost to Mauricio Oliveira on points in the opening round. Abreu was scheduled to compete against Nicholas Meregali at UFC Fight Pass Invitational 4 on June 29, 2023. He lost the match by armbar in EBI overtime.

Abreu competed against Anton Minenko in the co-main event of ADXC 1 on October 20, 2023. He won the match by unanimous decision.

Abreu faced Henrique Cardoso in the co-main event of ADXC 3 on March 2, 2024. He lost the match by decision.

Abreu was then invited to compete in the under 99 kg division of the 2024 ADCC World Championship on August 17 to 18, 2024. He beat both Daishi Goto and Javier Zaruski by decision to make it to the semi-finals, where he was submitted by Kaynan Duarte. He defeated Michael Pixley by points to win a bronze medal. Abreu also entered the absolute division where he beat Luiz Paulo, Izaak Michell, and Giancarlo Bodoni on points before being submitted by Kaynan Duarte in the final and winning a silver medal.

Abreu competed against Haisam Rida in the main event of ADXC 8 on December 6, 2024. Cyborg won a split decision, having previously lost to Rida by armbar submission.

=== 2025 ===
Abreu competed in the no gi absolute grand prix at BJJ Stars 16 on July 25, 2025. He was knocked out in the opening round.

== Fight Sports ==
Abreu currently living in Miami, United States where he runs his academy Fight Sports coaching multiple high level BJJ athletes.

In 2020, a BJJ black belt under Abreu and instructor at Fight Sports Naples, Marcel Goncalves, was accused of sexual assault by a student of his who was 16 years old at the time of the incident. Initially, Abreu drew heavy criticism for his handling of the claims and how he chose to comment on them before he eventually put out a further statement that denounced Goncalves' actions. Since then, Abreu has also been named in a civil suit on the same matter, where he and Fight Sports LLC were accused of "failure to properly oversee its trainers and instructors and its failures to properly care for vulnerable minors training at Fight Sports’ gyms." On June 17, 2023, a summary judgement was issued in the case that ruled in favor of Abreu and Fight Sports.

In 2023, a second sexual assault lawsuit named both Abreu and Fight Sports LLC, stemming from an incident concerning another affiliated gym. Mandy Schneider was allegedly sexually assaulted by Rodrigo da Costa Oliveira, the coach of Rockstar Martial Arts Gym in Frisco, Texas, in a hotel room. The lawsuit stated that Schneider told the managers of the gym, but they did not inform her parents or the authorities and instead ordered her to stay quiet. The lawsuit claimed that "The repeated failures of Roberto Abreu and Fight Sports to ensure the safety of underage athletes have fostered an environment ripe for such abuse."

== Personal life ==
Abreu was cast as Fábio Gurgel in The Smashing Machine.

Abreu was previously engaged to his jiu jitsu athlete Maggie Grindatti. They split in 2023.

== Brazilian Jiu Jitsu achievements ==
Main Achievements (Black Belt):

- ADCC World Champion (2013 (Note: Absolute))
- IBJJF No-Gi World Champion (2021 / 2019 / 2017 / 2012 / 2011 / 2010 (Note: Weight and absolute))
- IBJJF Pan Championship (2008 / 2022)
- IBJJF European Open (2005)
- IBJJF Grand Prix (2019)
- IBJJF Masters World Championship (2018)
- Kasai Pro 264 lbs Grand Prix winner (2020)
- Grappling Pro Champion (2016)
- 2nd Place ADCC World Championship (2009)
- 2nd Place IBJJF World Championship (2010)
- 2nd Place No-Gi World Champion (2021 / 2019 / 2008)
- 2nd Place IBJJF Pan Championship (2009)
- 2nd Place CBJJ Brazilian Nationals (2007)
- 2nd Place AJP King of Mats (2018)
- 3rd Place ADCC World Championship (2017/2013/2011)
- Brazilian Wrestling National Champion (Brazilian National team member).
- No Gi Grappler of the Year at the JitsMagazine BJJ Awards 2020
- 2020 FloGrappling No-Gi Grappler of the Year

Main Achievements (Colored Belt):

- IBJJF Pan American Champion (2001 blue)
- 2nd place World Jiu-Jitsu Championship (2004 brown)
- 3rd place World Jiu-Jitsu Championship (2002 / 2003 purple)
- 2nd place Pan American Championship (2002 purple)

== See also ==
- List of Brazilian Jiu-Jitsu practitioners
