= Abu Dhabi World Professional Jiu-Jitsu Championship =

Brazilian Jiu-Jitsu competitions

Abu Dhabi World Professional Jiu-Jitsu Championship (ADWPJJC)

Competition details
- Location: Abu Dhabi, UAE
- Discipline: Brazilian Jiu-Jitsu
- Type: Jiu-Jitsu Championship
- Organiser: UAE Jiu-Jitsu Federation

Divisions
- Current weight divisions: Weight classes: Men: Heavy (-120 kg); Light Heavy (-94 kg); Middle (-85 kg); Welter (-77 kg); Light (-69 kg); Feather (-62 kg); Light Feather -(-56 kg); Women: Heavy (-95 kg); Middle (-70 kg); Light (-62 kg); Light Feather (-55 kg); Rooster (-49 kg)

History
- First edition: May 1st and 2nd, 2009 in Abu Dhabi, UAE
- Most wins: (Brazil) Rodolfo Vieira (9)

The Abu Dhabi World Professional Jiu-Jitsu Championship (ADWPJJC), often simply called the Abu Dhabi World Pro, and from 2009 to 2014 known as the World Professional Jiu-Jitsu Cup (WPJJC), is an international Brazilian Jiu-Jitsu competition that takes place every year in Abu Dhabi, United Arab Emirates. The tournament is organized by the UAE Jiu-Jitsu Federation (UAEJJF) since 2012, attracting competitors from 60 countries across all belt levels.

== History ==
The first Abu Dhabi World Professional Jiu-Jitsu Championship was established in 2009 as the World Professional Jiu-Jitsu Cup. In 2022 it is considered the main event of the Abu Dhabi Jiu Jitsu Pro (AJP), a tournament circuit with over 80 events in all six continents, that also include the Abu Dhabi Grand Slam Jiu-Jitsu World Tour.

Supported personally by H.H. Sheikh Mohamed bin Zayed Al Nahyan, Supreme Commander of the Armed Forces, the inaugural 2009 tournament had a prize purse of US$111,000. This amount was increased further to US$150,000 in 2010 and is planned to increase to US$272,000 (AED 1,000,000) in 2011, which are the largest money prizes in history of Brazilian Jiu-Jitsu tournaments. In 2019 the World Pro attracted more than 5,000 competitors for a prize pot of $600,000.

Participation in the trials is not mandatory; however the winners of the trials have an all expenses (airfare, hotel, meals) paid trip to Abu Dhabi for the tournament.

== Gold medalists ==
=== Male black belt gold medalists ===
==== 2009–2011 ====
Year	65 kg	74 kg	83 kg	92 kg	+92 kg	Absolute
2009	(Brazil) Rafael Mendes (1/2)	(Brazil) Michael Langhi (1/1)	(Brazil) Tarsis Humphreys (1/2)	(Brazil) Rodolfo Vieira (1/7)	(Brazil) Alexandre Souza (1/1)	(Brazil) Tarsis Humphreys (2/2)
2010	(Brazil) Rafael Mendes (2/2)	(Brazil) Gilbert Burns (1/1)	(Brazil) Claudio Calasans (1/5)	(Brazil) Alexandro Ceconi (1/1)	(Brazil) Ricardo Abreu (1/1)	(Brazil) Claudio Calasans (2/5)
2011	(Brazil) Augusto Mendes (1/2)	(Brazil) Leandro Lo (1/5)	(Brazil) Claudio Calasans (3/5)	(Brazil) Rodolfo Vieira (2/7)	(Brazil) Lucio Rodrigues (1/1)	(Brazil) Rodolfo Vieira (3/7)

==== 2012–2014 ====
Year	64 kg	70 kg	76 kg	82 kg	88 kg	94 kg	100 kg	+100 kg	Absolute
2012	(Brazil) Fernando Vieira (1/1)	(Brazil) Samuel Canquerino (1/1)	(Brazil) Roberto de Souza (1/2)	(Brazil) Claudio Calasans (4/5)	(Brazil) André Galvão (1/3)	(Brazil) Rodolfo Vieira (4/7)	(Brazil) Alexandre Ribeiro (1/1)	(Brazil) Marcus Almeida (1/6)	(Brazil) Rodolfo Vieira (5/7)
2013	(Brazil) Thiago Marquez (1/1)	(Brazil) Augusto Mendes (2/2)	(Brazil) Leandro Lo (2/5)	(Brazil) Marcos Souza (1/1)	(Brazil) André Galvão (2/3)	(Brazil) Rodolfo Vieira (6/7)	(Brazil) Antonio Braga Neto (1/1)	(Brazil) Rodrigo Cavaca (1/1)	(Brazil) Marcus Almeida (2/6)
2014	(Brazil) João Miyao (1/2)	(Brazil) Leandro Saggiorio (1/1)	(Brazil) Roberto de Souza (2/2)	(Brazil) Leandro Lo (3/5)	(Brazil) André Galvão (3/3)	(Brazil) Braulio Estima (1/1)	(Brazil) Rodolfo Vieira (7/7)	(Brazil) Marcus Almeida (3/6)	(Brazil) Marcus Almeida (4/6)

==== 2015 ====
Year	65 kg	75 kg	85 kg	95 kg	+95 kg	Absolute
2015	(United States) Gianni Grippo (1/2)	(Brazil) Lucas Lepri (1/1)	(Brazil) Leandro Lo (4/5)	(Brazil) Felipe Pena (1/4)	(Brazil) Marcus Almeida (5/6)	(Brazil) Marcus Almeida (6/6)

==== 2016 ====
Year	62 kg	69 kg	77 kg	85 kg	94 kg	+94 kg	Absolute
2016	(Brazil) Hiago George (1/2)	(Brazil) Marcio Junior (1/1)	(Brazil) Gabriel Arges (1/2)	(Brazil) Leandro Lo (5/5)	(Brazil) Erberth Santos (1/2)	(Brazil) Ricardo Evangelista (1/1)	(Brazil) Felipe Pena (2/4)

==== 2017–2019 ====
Year	56 kg	62 kg	69 kg	77 kg	85 kg	94 kg	110 kg
2017	(Brazil) Rodnei Junior (1/1)	(United States) Mikey Musumeci (1/1)	(United States) Gianni Grippo (2/2)	(Brazil) Gabriel Arges (2/2)	(Brazil) Claudio Calasans (5/5)	(Brazil) Felipe Pena (3/4)	(Brazil) José Junior (1/1)
2018	(Brazil) José Carlos Lima (1/1)	(Brazil) João Miyao (2/2)	(Brazil) Paulo Miyao (1/2)	(Norway) Espen Mathiesen (1/1)	(Brazil) Isaque Bahiense (1/3)	(Brazil) Felipe Pena (4/4)	(Brazil) Erbeth Santos (2/2)
2019	(Brazil) Hiago George (2/2)	(Brazil) Joao Batista De Souza (1/1)	(Brazil) Paulo Miyao (2/2)	(Norway) Tommy Langaker (1/1)	(Brazil) Hudson Mateus Teles (1/1)	(Brazil) Kaynan Duarte (1/1)	(Brazil) Joao Rocha (1/1)

==== 2020-2025 ====
Year	56 kg	62 kg	69 kg	77 kg	85 kg	94 kg	120 kg
2020	(Brazil) Jonas Andrade (1/1)	(Brazil) Diego Batista (1/2)	(Brazil) Israel Sousa (1/1)	(Argentina) Pablo Lavaselli (1/2)	(Brazil) Isaque Bahiense (2/3)	(Poland) Adam Wardziński (1/1)	(Brazil) Gutemberg Pereira (1/1)
2021	(Brazil) Nathannael Fernandes (1/1)	(Brazil) Diego Reis (1/1)	(Argentina) Pablo Lavaselli (2/2)	(Brazil) Micael Galvão (1/1)	(Brazil) Isaque Bahiense (3/3)	(Brazil) Erich Munis (1/1)	(Brazil) Gutemberg Pereira (2/2)
2022	(United Arab Emirates) Zayed Alkatheeri (1/2)	(Brazil) Meyram Maquiné (1/2)	(Brazil) Diego Sodré (1/2)	(Brazil) Lucas Protásio (1/3)	(Brazil) Fellipe Silva (1/4)	(Brazil) Catriel Oliveira (1/1)	(Brazil) Yatan Bueno (1/1)
2023	(Brazil) Yuri Hendrex (1/1)	(Brazil) Meyram Maquiné (2/2)	(Brazil) Diego Sodré (2/2)	(Portugal) Pedro Ramalho (1/1)	(Portugal) Bruno Lima (1/1)	(Brazil) Fellipe Silva (2/4)	(Brazil) Felipe Bezerra (1/2)
2024	(Brazil) Thalison Soares (1/2)	(Brazil) Jefferson Fagundes (1/1)	(United States) Thiago Macedo (1/1)	(Brazil) Lucas Protásio (2/3)	(Brazil) Uanderson Ferreira (1/2)	(Brazil) Fellipe Silva (3/4)	(Brazil) Felipe Bezerra (2/2)
2025	(Brazil) Thalison Soares (2/2)	(United Arab Emirates) Zayed Alkatheeri (2/2)	(United States) Sebastian Serpa (1/1)	(Brazil) Lucas Protásio (3/3)	(Brazil) Uanderson Ferreira (2/2)	(Brazil) Fellipe Silva (4/4)	(Germany) Alexander Sak (1/1)

=== Female brown / black belt gold medalists ===
Ed.	Year		Under 63 kg	Over 63 kg			
2	2010		(Brazil) Luana Alzuguir; Alliance Jiu Jitsu	(Brazil) Gabi Garcia; Alliance Sp BRA			
Ed.	Year		Under 65 kg	Over 65 kg			
3	2011		(Brazil) Luana Alzuguir; Alliance Jiu Jitsu	(Brazil) Gabi Garcia; Alliance Sp BRA			
Ed.	Year	54 kg	60 kg	66 kg	72 kg	+72 kg	Absolute
4	2012	(Brazil) Samara Reis; Soul Fighters	(Brazil) Michelle Nicolini; Checkmat	(Brazil) Luana Alzuguir; Alliance Jiu Jitsu	(Brazil) Fernanda Mazelli; Striker JJ	(Brazil) Gabi Garcia; Alliance Sp BRA	(Brazil) Gabi Garcia; Alliance Sp BRA
Ed.	Year		60 kg	66 kg	72 kg	+72 kg	Open Class
5	2013		(Brazil) Michelle Nicolini; Checkmat	(Brazil) Luana Alzuguir; Alliance Jiu Jitsu	(Brazil) Caroline de Lazzer; Emirates Team	(Brazil) Gabi Garcia; Alliance Sp BRA	(Brazil) Gabi Garcia; Alliance Sp BRA
6	2014		(Brazil) Ariadne Oliveira; Equipe Mestre Wilson/Iron	(Brazil) Luiza Monteiro; ATOS	(Sweden) Janni Larsson; Checkmat	(Brazil) Gabi Garcia; Alliance Sp BRA	(Brazil) Gabi Garcia; Alliance Sp BRA
Ed.	Year		55 kg	65 kg	75 kg	+75 kg	Open Class
7	2015		(United States) Mackenzie Dern; Gracie Humaita	(Brazil) Beatriz Mesquita; Gracie Humaita	(Brazil) Monique Elias; Alliance Sp BRA	(Brazil) Gabi Garcia; Alliance Sp BRA	(United States) Mackenzie Dern; Gracie Humaita
Ed.	Year		55 kg	62 kg	70 kg	+70 kg	Open Class
8	2016		(Brazil) Mackenzie Dern; Gracie Humaita	(Brazil) Beatriz Mesquita; Gracie Humaita	(Brazil) Nathiely Melo Jesus; Pslpb Cicero Costha	(Brazil) Tayane Porfírio; Alliance Matriz (São Paulo)	(Brazil) Tayane Porfírio; Alliance Matriz (São Paulo)
Ed.	Year	49 kg	55 kg	62 kg	70 kg	90 kg	
9	2017	(Brazil) Mayssa Bastos; Gfteam	(Brazil) Talita Alencar; Alliance	(Brazil) Beatriz Mesquita; Gracie Humaitá	(Brazil) Ana Carolina Vieira; Gfteam	(Brazil) Nathiely de Jesus; Cícero Costha	
Ed.	Year	49 kg	55 kg	62 kg	70 kg	95 kg	
10	2018	(Brazil) Mayssa Bastos; Gfteam	(Belgium) Amal Amjahid; C.E.N.S. Academy	(Brazil) Bianca Basílio; JFC Almeida JJ	(Brazil) Ana Carolina Vieira; Gfteam	(Brazil) Angelica Galvao; ATOS	
11	2019	(Brazil) Mayssa Bastos; Gfteam	(Brazil) Bianca Basílio; JFC Almeida JJ	(Brazil) Beatriz Mesquita; Gracie Humaitá	(Brazil) Thamara Silva; Pslpb Cicero Costha	(Brazil) Gabrieli Pessanha; Infight Japan	
12	2020	(Brazil) Brenda Larissa; Al Wahda club Jiu-Jitsu Academy	(Brazil) Bianca Basílio; ATOS	(Brazil) Beatriz Mesquita; Gracie Humaitá	(Brazil) Julia Boscher; Gfteam	Gabrieli Pessanha; Infight Brazil	
13	2021	(Brazil) Brenda Larissa; Al Wahda club Jiu-Jitsu Academy	(Brazil) Ana Rodrigues; Al Wahda club Jiu-Jitsu Academy	(Brazil) Beatriz Mesquita; Gracie Humaitá	(Brazil) Ingridd Sousa; Guigo Jiu Jitsu	Gabrieli Pessanha; Infight Brazil	
14	2022	(Brazil) Brenda Larissa; Al Wahda club Jiu-Jitsu Academy	(Brazil) Ana Rodrigues; Al Wahda club Jiu-Jitsu Academy	(Brazil) Julia Alves; Gfteam	(Brazil) Izadora Silva; ADMA	Gabrieli Pessanha; Infight Brazil	
15	2023	(Brazil) Mayssa Bastos; Art of Jiu Jitsu	Ana Rodrigues; ADMA Brazil	(Brazil) Julia Alves; Gfteam	Ingridd Sousa; ADMA Brazil	Gabrieli Pessanha; Infight Brazil|	
16	2024	(Brazil) Grasielle Brandao; Commando Group	(Brazil) Maria Luisa Delahaye; Commando Group	(United States) Sarah Galvao; ATOS	(Canada) Lillian Marchand; ATOS	(Brazil) Yara Soares; Fratres Brazilian Jiu Jitsu	
15	2025	(Brazil) Grasielle Brandao; Commando Group	(Brazil) Gabriela Pereira Brothers Club	(Canada) Lillian Marchand ATOS	(Brazil) Sabatha Santos Fratres Brazilian Jiu Jitsu	(Brazil) Yara Nascimento M.O.D UAE	

== See also ==
- Abu Dhabi Grand Slam Jiu-Jitsu World Tour
- UAEJJF weight classes
