= Julio Cesar Pereira =

Brazilian jiu-jitsu coach from Brazil (born 1964)

- Born: 22 December 1964 (age 60); Rio de Janeiro, Brazil
- Team: GFTeam
- Rank: 8th deg. BJJ red and white coral belt (Note: Under Oswaldo Fadda); Judo black belt

Other information
- Occupation: BJJ team leader

Julio Cesar Pereira is an 8th degree red and white belt coral belt Brazilian jiu-jitsu (BJJ) practitioner from Brazil.

An international master champion, two-time IBJJF World champion, two-times Pan American champion, eight-times Brazilian champion and 21 times champion of Rio de Janeiro State; Pereira is a renowned coach as the founder and team leader of GFTeam, one of the most accomplished competition teams in jiu-jitsu.

== Career ==
Julio Cesar Pereira was born in Rio de Janeiro, Brazil on 22 December 1964. Pereira started training Jiu Jitsu from the age of 10 under Monir Salomão, founder of the Academia Monir de Jiu-Jitsu, and an Oswaldo Fadda black belt. Pereira also trained Judo and Luta Livre. Pereira trained under Salomão until he received his black belt.

In 1996 Pereira started coaching the grappling team of the Gama Filho University, alongside Marcus Bello and Alexandre Baraúna. In 2007 following the closing of the university's grappling program, Pereira founded a new team with the same group of fighters, independent of the university, called Grappling Fight Team (GFTeam). To help athletes from humble background Pereira set up at the GFT headquarters, based out of the neighbourhood of Meier in Rio's north zone, a fighter house named Cachanga. Under Pereira's leadership, the team became one of the most accomplished competition teams in jiu-jitsu, producing countless champions such as Rodolfo Vieira, Mayssa Bastos, Gutemberg Pereira, or Vitor Oliveira. His coaching method is known to be based on a traditional high level jiu jitsu style through "very detailed technique tuition", "positional concepts" and "extensive sparring".

In 2016, after 31 years at black belt, Pereira received his 7th degree coral belt in jiu jitsu from the IBJJF. In 2018 he moved to Orange County, California that same year he won the South America IBJJF Master International, a traditional championship in the Olympic Park of Barra da Tijuca of Rio, gathering the best South American BJJ veterans, Pereira won in the Master-Five medium heavyweight division.

== Championships and accomplishments ==
Some of Pereira's accomplishments:

- Master International South America Champion (2018)
- 2 x IBJJF World Champion
- 21 x Rio de Janeiro State Champion
- 8 x Brazilian National Champion

== Instructor lineage ==
Mitsuyo Maeda > Luis França > Oswaldo Fadda > Monir Salomão > Julio Cesar Pereira
