= Tarsis Humphreys =

Brazilian martial artist (born 1983)

- Born: Tarsis Carvalho Humphreys; November 4, 1983 (age 42); São Paulo, Brazil
- Nationality: (Brazil) Brazilian
- Height: 5 ft 10 in (1.78 m)
- Weight: 81 kg (179 lb; 12.8 st)
- Division: 88 kg (194 lb; 13.9 st)
- Style: Brazilian jiu-jitsu
- Fighting out of: São Paulo, Brazil
- Team: Alliance Jiu Jitsu
- Rank: 4th degree black belt in Brazilian Jiu-Jitsu

Tarsis Humphreys
Medal record

Representing Brazil

Submission wrestling

Abu Dhabi Combat Club
Bronze medal – third place	2007 Newark, New Jersey	-88kg

Brazilian jiu-jitsu

World Championship
Bronze medal – third place	2007 California, USA	-88kg
Bronze medal – third place	2008 California, USA	-94kg
Silver medal – second place	2009 California, USA	-88kg
Gold medal – first place	2010 California, USA	-88kg
Silver medal – second place	2015 California, USA	-88kg

Abu Dhabi World Pro
Gold medal – first place	2009 Abu Dhabi, UAE	-83 kg
Gold medal – first place	2009 Abu Dhabi, UAE	Absolute

Brazilian National Championship
Silver medal – second place	2009 Rio de Janeiro, Brazil	-88kg
Gold medal – first place	2009 Rio de Janeiro, Brazil	Absolute
Gold medal – first place	2010 Rio de Janeiro, Brazil	-88kg
Bronze medal – third place	2010 Rio de Janeiro, Brazil	Absolute
Silver medal – second place	2013 Rio de Janeiro, Brazil	-88kg

Tarsis Carvalho Humphreys (born November 4, 1983) is a Brazilian jiu-jitsu practitioner. He became a jiu-jitsu black belt under Fábio Gurgel, the co-founder of the Alliance Jiu Jitsu.

== Early life and training ==
Humphreys was born in São Paulo, Brazil. He began training Brazilian jiu-jitsu as a child and quickly stood out for his talent and dedication. Under the mentorship of Fábio Gurgel, Humphreys progressed through the ranks and became one of the team’s most consistent and accomplished athletes. His development within the Alliance academy, a powerhouse in the sport, played a crucial role in shaping his competitive mindset and technical style.

== Career ==
From 1998 to 2009, Humphreys medaled in every adult black belt division he entered, establishing himself as one of Alliance’s top competitors. He won the IBJJF World Jiu-Jitsu Championship in 2010 in the medium-heavyweight division and also claimed gold at the inaugural Abu Dhabi World Professional Jiu-Jitsu Championship in both his weight class and the absolute division, where he defeated Braulio Estima in the final.

He is also a veteran of the ADCC World Championships. In 2007, he earned a bronze medal in the under 88 kg division after losing in the semi-finals to Demian Maia, who went on to win the division by defeating Flávio Almeida in the final.

== Titles and accomplishments ==
- IBJJF World Champion – Medium Heavyweight (2010)
- ADCC World Championship – Bronze Medalist (2007)
- Abu Dhabi World Pro Champion – 1st place (Weight and Absolute, 2009)

== See also ==
- Jackson Sousa
- Tommy Langaker
