= Braulio Estima =

Brazilian martial artist

- Born: June 10, 1980 (age 46); Recife, Brazil
- Height: 6 ft 3 in (1.91 m)
- Weight: 190 lb (86 kg; 14 st)
- Team: Gracie Barra
- Rank: 5th degree black belt in Brazilian jiu-jitsu

Mixed martial arts record
- Total: 1
- Wins: 1
- By submission: 1
- Losses: 0

Other information
[http://www.sherdog.com/fightfinder/fightfinder.asp?fighterID=59322
Braulio Estima
Medal record
Representing Brazil
Grappling
ADCC
Silver medal – second place	2007 New Jersey, USA	-99kg
Gold medal – first place	2009 Barcelona, Spain	-88kg
Gold medal – first place	2009 Barcelona, Spain	Absolute
Gold medal – first place	2011 Nottingham, England	Superfight
Brazilian Jiu-Jitsu
World Championship
Gold medal – first place	2004 Rio de Janeiro, Brazil	-88kg
Silver medal – second place	2005 Rio de Janeiro, Brazil	-88kg
Bronze medal – third place	2005 Rio de Janeiro, Brazil	Absolute
Gold medal – first place	2006 Rio de Janeiro, Brazil	-88kg
Silver medal – second place	2008 California, USA	-99kg
Gold medal – first place	2009 California, USA	-99kg
Silver medal – second place	2013 California, USA	-88kg
Pan American Championship
Gold medal – first place	2006 California, USA	-94kg
Bronze medal – third place	2006 California, USA	Absolute
Pan American No-Gi Championship
Gold medal – first place	2008 California, USA	-91.5kg
Gold medal – first place	2008 California, USA	Absolute
European Championship
Gold medal – first place	2007 Lisbon, Portugal	-94kg
Gold medal – first place	2007 Lisbon, Portugal	Absolute
Gold medal – first place	2009 Lisbon, Portugal	-94kg
Gold medal – first place	2009 Lisbon, Portugal	Absolute
Gold medal – first place	2011 Lisbon, Portugal	-88kg
Mixed martial arts record] from Sherdog

Braulio de Oliveira Estima is a 5th degree black belt in Brazilian jiu-jitsu. He received his black belt from Carlos Gracie Jr. on January 4, 2004. Throughout his grappling career, he has won in many Brazilian Jiu-Jitsu tournaments across the world, such as the Mundials, ADCC, Pan American Championship, and European Championship. His long list of accomplishments has made him well respected among other Brazilian Jiu-Jitsu practitioners, such that some consider him one of the top Brazilian Jiu-Jitsu practitioners in the world and one of the head coaches for Gracie Barra U.K.

== Early life and education ==
Braulio Estima was born on June 10, 1980, in Recife, Brazil. He was first exposed to martial arts at the young age of 9, where he was introduced to Judo. However, a year later, his judo instructor suffered an untimely death, which caused Estima to take a break from martial arts. Six years later, he decided to come back and began training Judo and Brazilian jiu-jitsu at the Gracie Barra Jiu-Jitsu Academy.

Estima was first under thetutelage of Charles Dos Anjos when he first began training Brazilian jiu-jitsu at Gracie Barra. In less than one year of training, he captured 5 major junior titles in the white belt division, and as a result, was promoted to blue belt. When Dos Anjos left the academy, Ze Radiola took over as Estima's mentor and teacher. In 1999, after 3 years of training, Estima won his first Pan-American Championship as a blue belt. He was then promoted to purple belt soon after. Following more successful tournament showings, such as the bronze medal at the Pan-American Championship in 2000, he was promoted to brown belt. He went on to win gold for three straight years (2001-2003) in the Pan-American Championship as a brown belt.

== Career ==
At the end of 2002, Maurição Gomes invited Estima to teach at the Gracie Barra Academy in Birmingham, England, to replace him. Estima accepted Maurição's offer and made Birmingham his permanent home. He continues to teach there to this day with the help of his brother Victor Estima and Otavio Souza. Since then, Estima has taught several respected UK grapplers such as Graham Keys, Kenny Baker, Tom Barlow, Chris Rees and Luke Costello.

On January 4, 2004, Estima received his black belt from Carlos Gracie Jr. Five months after this, Estima won the Mundials in the 85 kg weight division. This victory made him well respected among other Brazilian jiu-jitsu practitioners because he was only a black belt for 5 months when he won the tournament. Two years later, Estima went on to win the 2006 Mundials and Pan American Championship and eventually captured all the major titles when he won the European Championship, Mundials, and ADCC in 2009. After the 2014 IBJJF World Championship Estima tested positive for DMAA, a banned Performance Enhancing Drugs, Estima was stripped of his 2014 World title by IBJJF and USADA and suspended for two years.

=== Mixed martial arts ===
Estima began training in mixed martial arts, and MMA organization Shine Fights signed him to a multi-fight deal. He was scheduled to debut against Rick Hawn on Shine Fights: Worlds Collide in May 2010, but the entire card was scrapped following the loss of the card's headliner, Mayorga vs. Thomas. Estima rescheduled his MMA debut, signing with Titan Fighting Championships. In 2012, Estima signed with Authentic Sports Management and trained with MMA fighters such as Rashad Evans, Jorge Santiago, and Eddie Alvarez.

=== Braulio Estima and Nick Diaz's feud ===
Estima was scheduled to face Nick Diaz in a No-Gi Brazilian jiu-jitsu superfight at the 2012 World Jiu-Jitsu Expo. It was expected to take place on May 12, 2012, in Long Beach, California. However, Nick Diaz did not show up to the fight leaving Estima waited on the mat, later Diaz claimed that Estima did not make weight even though Estima weigh in on competition day at the required 180 pounds (82 kg) weight limit. Estima refused to fight a late replacement and offered instead to fight Diaz in a mixed martial arts bout.

After UFC 158, Estima, who was a training partner for Georges St-Pierre, went backstage to go shake Diaz's hand. Nick responded by shoving him and calling him names. According to Estima, Kron Gracie was antagonizing him along with Diaz.

== Records ==
Estima made history when he submitted seven people in a total of 5 minutes and 24 seconds at the 2003 Pan-American Championship.

Estima currently holds the most wins at the European Championship, with a total number of 5.

Estima was also part of the inaugural class of the ADCC Hall of Fame, inducted in 2021.

== Nickname ==
His nickname, Carcará, comes from a name of a bird around his hometown in northeast Brazil. In addition, he also used to wear a gi brand called Carcará, which has been discontinued.

== Mixed martial arts record ==
Professional record breakdown
1 match	1 win	0 losses
By knockout	0	0
By submission	1	0
By decision	0	0

Res.	Record	Opponent	Method	Event	Date	Round	Time	Location	Notes
Win	1–0	Chris Holland	Technical submission (arm triangle choke)	Titan Fighting Championships 24	August 24, 2012	1	3:21	Kansas City, Kansas, United States	MMA debut

== Grappling results ==
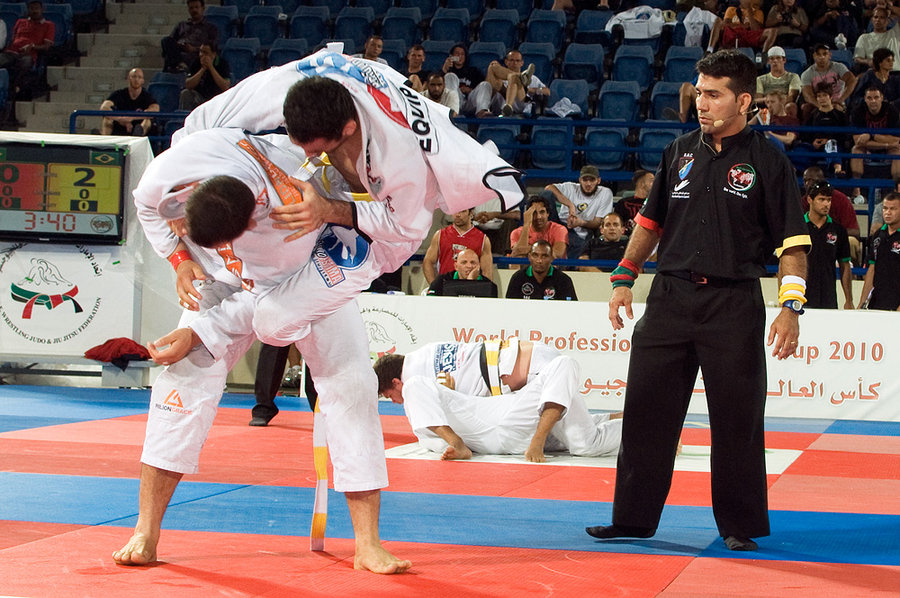
Braulio Estima at World Professional Jiu-Jitsu Cup 2010 in Abu Dhabi

- World Professional Jiu-Jitsu Cup 2010 (2nd place in Absolute and -83 kg divisions)
- World Professional Jiu-Jitsu Cup 2009 (2nd place in Absolute and 4th place in -95 kg divisions)
- 2011 ADCC Submission Wrestling World Championship - Superfight Champion
- 2009 ADCC Submission Wrestling World Championship - 88 kg and Absolute Champion
- Absolute World Cup Champion - 2006
- Absolute World Champion - 2002
- World Champion - 2004, 2006, 2009
- ~~World Champion - 2014~~ (disqualified)
- Grand Slam Capital Challenge Jordan - 2008 heavy weight and Absolute Champion
- Pan American Champion - 1999, 2001, 2002, 2003, 2006
- Absolute Pan American Champion - 2003
- Pan American No Gi Champion - 2008
- Absolute Pan American No Gi Champion - 2008
- European Champion - 2007, 2009, 2011
- Absolute European Champion - 2007, 2009
- Champion of the International Team - 2003, 2007
- Champion's Challenge BRAZIL X USA - 2003
- ADCC Silver Medalist - 2007
- World Silver Medalist - 2008
- 3rd placed on the World Championship - 2003
- 3rd placed on the World Championship - 2001
- 1st place on the World Championship-2001

== See also ==
- List of Brazilian Jiu-Jitsu practitioners
