= Roger Gracie =

Brazilian Jiu-Jitsu practitioner and mixed martial artist

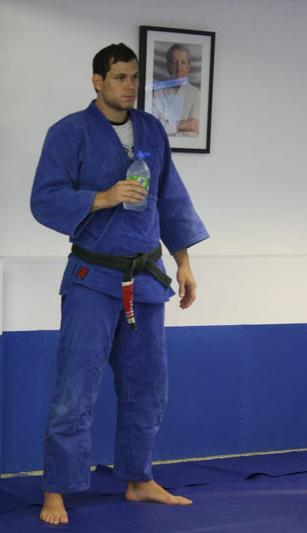
- Gracie in 2010
- Born: Roger Gracie Gomes; September 26, 1981 (age 45); Rio de Janeiro, Brazil
- Height: 6 ft 4 in (193 cm)
- Weight: 218 lb (99 kg; 15 st 8 lb)
- Division: Super heavyweight (BJJ); Middleweight (MMA) Light Heavyweight
- Reach: 79 in (201 cm)
- Style: Brazilian Jiu-Jitsu
- Fighting out of: London, England
- Team: Roger Gracie Academy; Gracie Barra (BJJ); Evolve (MMA)
- Trainer: Mauricio Gomes; Renzo Gracie; Carlos Gracie Jr.; Rilion Gracie
- Rank: 5th deg. BJJ black belt (Note: under Carlos Gracie Jr.)
- Years active: 2006–2017

Mixed martial arts record
- Total: 10
- Wins: 8
- By knockout: 1
- By submission: 6
- By decision: 1
- Losses: 2
- By knockout: 1
- By decision: 1

Other information
- Occupation: Brazilian jiu-jitsu instructor
- Website: Roger Gracie Jiu-Jitsu
- Mixed martial arts record from Sherdog

Roger Gracie (born Roger Gracie Gomes; (Note: Gracie chose to use his mother's surname when he started competing.) 26 September 1981) is a Brazilian former professional mixed martial artist, submission grappler, and 5th degree Brazilian jiu-jitsu (BJJ) practitioner and coach. As a mixed martial artist, he formerly competed in the Light Heavyweight division of ONE FC, in where he was the inaugural Light Heavyweight World Champion, a title he held until retirement. He also competed in Strikeforce, and the Ultimate Fighting Championship (UFC). As a Brazilian jiu-jitsu practitioner and submission grappler, he held 12 major world championships across the International Brazilian Jiu-Jitsu Federation (IBJJF), and ADCC Submission Fighting World Championship (ADCC).

Roger Gracie is the son of coral belt Mauricio Gomes and grandson of BJJ founder Carlos Gracie.

A member of both IBJJF Hall of Fame and ADCC Hall of Fame, Gracie won 10 IBJJF world championship titles across multiple weight classes, every year from 2004 to 2010, becoming the first competitor to win the open weight division 3 times. He is also a two-time European Champion, and a Pan Champion. Gracie is an ADCC Submission Fighting weight, absolute, and superfight champion, the only athlete to win gold in both his weight class and the open weight division with a 100% submission-rate. Gracie retired in 2017 after defeating then BJJ world champion Marcus Buchecha, leaving jiu-jitsu without a single submission defeat on his record.

Competing concurrently in MMA, Gracie is the 2016 ONE Light Heavyweight Champion, a former Strikeforce and UFC middleweight contender, holding at the time of his retirement in 2017 a professional record of 8–2.

== Early life ==
Roger Gomes Gracie was born on 26 September 1981 in Rio de Janeiro, Brazil. His mother, Reila Gracie, was a daughter of Carlos Gracie, the founder of Brazilian jiu-jitsu, and his father, Mauricio Gomes, was a jiu-jitsu black belt under Rolls Gracie and a famous competitor in the 1970s known as Maurição. From a very young age Gracie started training Brazilian Jiu-Jitsu.

== Brazilian jiu-jitsu career ==
=== Early career ===
During his teenage years, after training with his uncle Rilion Gracie, Gracie started competition. In 1999 he won the Brazilian National Jiu-Jitsu Championship fighting as blue belt in the middleweight division then the following year Gracie won the 2000 Pan American Championship followed by the World Jiu-Jitsu Championship both in the medium-heavy blue belt division. That same year, 18-year-old Gracie was arrested by the Civil Police of Rio de Janeiro together with three other grapplers (Rafael Lima, Rafael Ramos and Murilo Carvalho), for allegedly shooting paintball and rubber bullets guns at three transvestites. Gracie was not prosecuted but the incident led his mother to send him to London to live with his father, who had moved to England to set up the first Gracie Barra academy in the UK.

Training in the UK with his father and in Brazil with his uncle Carlos Gracie, Jr., Gracie won another world championship title in 2001, this time as a purple belt, in the medium heavy division, under team Gracie Barra; Also in 2001 after receiving his brown belt he won the Brazilian Nationals for the second time. In 2002 as a brown belt Gracie won both the heavyweight division and the open class becoming double world champion for the first time. Competing at the 2003 ADCC Submission Fighting World Championship taking place for the first time in São Paulo on 17 May, Gracie arrived third in the -99 kilograms (218 lb) category, after defeating Mário Sperry and Rigan Machado but losing to John-Olav Einemo (2–0). In 2003 at age 22, Gracie received his black belt from his uncle Carlos Gracie Jr.

=== Black belt career ===
In his first year as black belt Gracie won silver at the 2003 World Championship after losing by points to Márcio Cruz. In 2004 Gracie won the ADCC South American Trials held in Campos Brazil, winning both his weight class (-99 kilograms (218 lb)) and the open weight division with a 100% submission-rate.

==== 2004–2005: First IBJJF titles, ADCC world double gold ====
At the 2004 World Jiu-Jitsu Championship, Gracie won the super heavyweight division but lost the final of the Absolute in a controversial match, after his opponent Ronaldo "Jacaré" Souza refused to tap out after getting armbared, got his arm dislocated as a result, then stayed away from Gracie with his broken left arm tucked into his belt, to keep his lead on points and win the match.

In May 2005 Gracie competed in the ADCC Submission Wrestling World Championship taking place at the Walter Pyramid in Long Beach California. Gracie won all 8 of his matches, both at the super heavyweight and at the absolute weight classes, submitting Ronaldo Souza with a rear naked choke from standing, becoming the first grappler in history to win both divisions after submitting every single opponent. That same year Gracie won the 2005 World Jiu-Jitsu Championship with silver in Absolute, then double gold at the 2005 European Open Championship winning the ultra heavyweight division and defeating Ronaldo Souza in the Absolute.

==== 2006–2007: Pan Am champion, ADCC superfight champion ====
In April 2006 competing at the Pan American Championship taking place at California State University, Gracie won silver in the super heavyweight division after losing by points to Xande Ribeiro, the fourth loss of his career; he then won gold in Absolute after submitting the same Ribeiro in a triangle within 30 seconds. Gracie won another world title in 2006, at the World Jiu-Jitsu Championship taking place in Rio de Janeiro, after defeating Robert Drysdale in the super heavyweight final, Gracie then won silver in Absolute, after losing by points against Xande Ribeiro, in the last few seconds of the fight;

In 2007 Gracie won both divisions, earning double world championship gold for weight and absolute, submitting all his opponents except Fernando Pontes "Margarida"; At the 2007 ADCC world championships in Trenton, New Jersey, Gracie fought and won by points, a superfight against Jon Olav Einemo, one of only four men who had managed to defeat him in the past, Gracie became in the process the first ADCC triple crown winner.

==== 2008–2010: Tenth world title, retirement from competition ====
The following year Gracie became the 2008 World Champion but lost the Absolute final against Xande Ribeiro after the clock ran out. At the 2009 World Championship Gracie submitted all of his opponents, in the super heavyweight and in the absolute weight class, with a "cross choke from mount", winning double gold again.

In 2010 Gracie fought his last world championship, Gracie won both divisions, winning 8 fights with a "choke from the back", defeating Ricardo Abreu by points in the Super Heavyweight final, and winning the Absolute without fighting, after Romulo Barral forfeited due to an injury. Gracie became the first athlete to win 3 Open weight titles at black belt level. Gracie announced leaving BJJ competition to focus on his mixed martial arts career.

=== Superfights ===
==== Gracie vs. Buchecha ====
In 2012, Gracie returned to grappling competition for one night only at Metamoris 1, a submission only superfights event, to face Marcus 'Buchecha' Almeida "the new 22-year-old heavyweight jiu-jitsu sensation', the bout was ruled a draw, while the match, which lasted 20 minutes, was noted by some as "one of the greatest grappling matches ever recorded".

==== Gracie vs. Comprido ====
In July 2015, having not competed jiu-jitsu in 5 years, Gracie returned to competitive grappling to face Rodrigo Comprido, at a superfight American Nationals event during the UFC Fan Expo, winning via armbar in about 4 minutes.

==== Gracie vs. Buchecha II ====
On 23 July 2017, at Gracie Pro jiu-jitsu an event taking place at Carioca Arena 1 in Rio de Janeiro, Gracie faced Marcus "Buchecha" Almeida for a 15-minute superfight dubbed "the most-anticipated rematch in jiu-jitsu history", at that point both fighters held 10 world championship titles and were considered the greatest competitors in the sport. In the five previous years Gracie only fought one match against Rodrigo Comprido while Buchecha fought seventy matches winning more world championship titles than any other fighter at the time. Gracie submitted Buchecha with a lapel choke at the 6:52 mark of the match, right after his win, Gracie announced his final retirement from BJJ competition.

=== Recognition ===
Having never been submitted in 20 years of competition, holding 14 World Jiu-Jitsu Championship titles (10 as black belt), with three gold and five silver in the open weight division, Gracie is regarded by many as the greatest jiu-jitsu competitor of all time. In May 2014 he was inducted into the International Brazilian Jiu-Jitsu Federation Hall of Fame.

On 14 November 2021, Gracie became the first person to be inducted into the ADCC Hall of Fame, owing in part to his two gold medals at the 2005 ADCC world championship and his superfight victory in 2007. In July 2022 Gracie received his 5th Stripe on his BJJ black belt from his father, Mauricio Gomes.

== Mixed martial arts career ==
Gracie made his MMA debut in 2006, defeating veteran Ron Waterman by armbar submission in the 1st round at the Bodogfight pay-per-view USA vs Russia. On May 18, 2008, Gracie competed at Sengoku 2, where he defeated Yuki Kondo at 2:40 min of round 1 by rear naked choke.

=== 2009–2012: Strikeforce ===
Gracie announced at the December 19, 2009, Strikeforce Evolution show that he had signed a contract with Strikeforce to make his American MMA debut. On September 11, 2011, Gracie suffered his first MMA loss when he faced former Strikeforce light heavyweight champion Muhammed Lawal. Gracie was knocked out in the first round. Gracie made his middleweight debut against UFC veteran Keith Jardine at Strikeforce: Rockhold vs. Kennedy on July 14, 2012, winning the fight via unanimous decision. Gracie then won his next bout via submission defeating Anthony Smith at Strikeforce: Marquardt vs. Saffiedine

=== 2013: Ultimate Fighting Championship ===
On January 15, 2013, the UFC announced that Gracie would be one of 20 Strikeforce fighters folding into the organisation, making him the 4th member of the Gracie family to fight in the Ultimate Fighting Championship.

Gracie fought Tim Kennedy on July 6, 2013, at UFC 162. His training camp included Bulgarian national wrestling champion Lyubo Kumbarov. Gracie lost the fight by unanimous decision, and the UFC opted not to renew his contract.

=== 2014–2016: ONE Championship ===
In August 2014, Gracie signed a multi-fight deal with Singapore based promotion ONE Championship. Gracie returned to the Light Heavyweight division, known as "Cruiserweight" on ONE, and in his debut faced James McSweeney at ONE FC 23: Warrior's Way on December 5, 2014. He won the fight via TKO in the third round.

On May 6, 2016, he defeated Michal Pasternak for the inaugural ONE FC Cruiserweight Championship, winning the bout by Arm Triangle in the first round.

On October 14, 2017 Gracie announced his retirement from MMA three months after retiring from Brazilian jiu-jitsu.

== Coaching career ==
With the help of his father, 8th degree coral belt Maurício "Maurição" Motta Gomes, Roger established the Roger Gracie Academy in 2004 in Ladbroke Grove, London. Notable Black belt promotions include Raymond Stevens, Nicolas Gregoriades and Kywan Gracie Behring.

Gracie served as a coach alongside Rigan Machado, Jean Jacques Machado, and Dean Lister on season 6 of the Professional Grappling Federation on April 21 to 26, 2024. Gracie led Team Epic Roll at the tournament, and finished in fourth place.

Gracie returned to coach on season 7 of the Professional Grappling Federation on November 3 to 8, 2024, alongside Dean Lister, Pedro Sauer, and Carlos Machado. Gracie led the 1st Phorm team.

== Personal life ==
Gracie and his ex-wife have a son and a daughter. Gracie got remarried again in January 2026 to Vivien Monory.

== Championships and accomplishments ==
=== Brazilian jiu-jitsu / Submission wrestling ===
Main Achievements (Black Belt):

- 10 x IBJJF World Champion (2004 / 2005 / 2006 / 2007 (Note: Weight and absolute) / 2008 / 2009/2010)
- 2 x IBJJF Pan American Champion (2006 (Note: Absolute))
- 2 x IBJJF European Open Champion (2005)
- 2 x ADCC Submission Fighting World Champion (2005)
- ADCC Superfight Champion (2007)
- 2nd place IBJJF World Championship (2003/2004/2005/2006/2008)
- 2nd place IBJJF Pan Championship (2006)
- 3rd place ADCC Submission Fighting World Championship (2003)

Main Achievements (Coloured Belts):

- 4 x IBJJF World Champion (2000 blue, 2001 purple, 2002 brown)
- 2 x Brazilian National Champion (1999 blue / 2001 brown)

=== Mixed martial arts ===
- ONE Light Heavyweight World Championship (One time, inaugural)

== Career records ==
=== Brazilian jiu-jitsu / Submission wrestling record ===
Record	Result	Opponent	Method	Event	Date	Round	Time	Notes
67–7–1	Win	Marcus Almeida	Submission (choke from the back)	Gracie Pro SUPERFIGHT	2017		6min 52s	Super Fight
66–7–1	Win	Rodrigo Medeiros	Submission (Armbar)	2015 IBJJF Black Belt League Super Fight (UFC Fan Expo)	2015	1	4min 25s	Super Fight
65–7–1	Draw	Marcus Almeida	Decision	Metamoris	2012	1	20:00	
65–7	Win	Romulo Barral	Forfeit (Injury)	World Jiu-Jitsu Championship (Absolute Division)	2010			Final
64–7	Win	Ricardo "Demente" Abreu	Points (13–2)	World Jiu-Jitsu Championship (Super Heavyweight Division)	2010			Final
63–7	Win	Walter Vital	Submission (Choke from Mount)	World Jiu-Jitsu Championship(Super Heavyweight Division)	2010			
62–7	Win	Bruno Bastos	Submission	World Jiu-Jitsu Championship(Super Heavyweight Division)	2010			
61–7	Win	Luiz Fernando	Submission (Choke)	World Jiu-Jitsu Championship(Super Heavyweight Division)	2010			
60–7	Win	Tarsis Humphreys	Submission	World Jiu-Jitsu Championship(Absolute Division)	2010			
59–7	Win	Rodrigo Cavaca	Submission (Armbar)	World Jiu-Jitsu Championship(Absolute Division)	2010			
58–7	Win	Diego Herzog	Submission (Choke)	World Jiu-Jitsu Championship(Absolute Division)	2010			
57–7	Win	Frost Murphy	Submission (Choke)	World Jiu-Jitsu Championship(Absolute Division)	2010			
56–7	Win	Romulo Barral	Submission (Cross Choke from mount)	World Jiu-Jitsu Championship (Absolute Division)	2009			Final
55–7	Win	Ricardo "Demente" Abreu	Submission (Cross Choke from mount)	World Jiu-Jitsu Championship (Super Heavyweight Division)	2009			Final
54–7	Win	Claudio Calasans	Submission	World Jiu-Jitsu Championship (Absolute Division)	2009			
53–7	Win	Rafael Lovato Jr.	Submission	World Jiu-Jitsu Championship (Absolute Division)	2009			
52–7	Win	Bernardo Faria	Submission	World Jiu-Jitsu Championship (Super Heavy)	2009			
51–7	Win	Bruno Bastos	Submission	World Jiu-Jitsu Championship (Super Heavy)	2009	– YouTube		
50–7	Loss	Alexandre Ribeiro	Points (4–2)	World Jiu-Jitsu Championship (Absolute Division)	2008			Final
50–6	Win	Leonardo Leite	Submission (Cross Choke from mount)	World Jiu-Jitsu Championship (Super Super Heavyweight Division)	2008			Final
49–6	Win	Eduardo Telles	Advantage	World Jiu-Jitsu Championship	2008			
48–6	Win	Luigi Mondelli	Submission	World Jiu-Jitsu Championship	2008			
47–6	Win	Rodrigo Cavaca	Submission	World Jiu-Jitsu Championship	2008			
46–6	Win	Jon Olav Einemo	Points (5–0)	ADCC Submission Wrestling World Championship (Superfight)	2007			Superfight
45–6	Win	Romulo Barral	Submission (Cross Choke from mount)	World Jiu-Jitsu Championship (Absolute Division)	2007			Final
44–6	Win	Robert Drysdale	Submission	World Jiu-Jitsu Championship (Absolute Division)	2007			Semi-final
43–6	Win	Robert Drysdale	Submission	World Jiu-Jitsu Championship (Super Heavyweight Division)	2007			Final
42–6	Win	Fernando "Margarida" Pontes	Points	World Jiu-Jitsu Championship	2007			
41–6	Win	Tim Carpenter	Submission	World Jiu-Jitsu Championship	2007			
40–6	Win	Rodrigo Cavaca	Submission	World Jiu-Jitsu Championship	2007			
39–6	Win	Adriano Camolesi	Submission	World Jiu-Jitsu Championship	2007			
38–6	Win	Rodrigo Medeiros	Submission	World Jiu-Jitsu Championship	2007			
37–6	Loss	Alexandre Ribeiro	Points	World Jiu-Jitsu Championship (Absolute Division)	2006			Final
37–5	Win	Robert Drysdale	Submission (Cross Choke from mount)	World Jiu-Jitsu Championship (Super Heavyweight Division)	2006			Final
36–5	Win	Marcelo Garcia	Submission	World Jiu-Jitsu Championship	2006			
35–5	Win	Rodrigo Cavaca	Submission	World Jiu-Jitsu Championship	2006			
34–5	Win	Pedro Schmall	Submission	World Jiu-Jitsu Championship	2006			
33–5	Win	Rodrigo Medeiros	Submission	World Jiu-Jitsu Championship	2006			
32–5	Win	Zumbi Machado		World Jiu-Jitsu Championship	2006			
31–5	Win	Alexandre Ribeiro	Submission (Triangle)	Pan American Jiu-Jitsu Championship	2006			Absolute Final
30–5	Loss	Alexandre Ribeiro	Advantage	Pan American Jiu-Jitsu Championship	2006			Weight Final
30–4	Win	Tiago Gaia	Submission	Pan American Jiu-Jitsu Championship	2006			
29–4	Win	Raphael Lovato Jr.	Submission	Pan American Jiu-Jitsu Championship	2006			
28–4	Win	Joao Silva	Submission	Pan American Jiu-Jitsu Championship	2006			
27–4	Loss	Ronaldo Souza	Points (2–0)	World Jiu-Jitsu Championship (Absolute Division)	2005			Final
27–3	Win	Alexandre Ribeiro	Points (12–2)	World Jiu-Jitsu Championship (Super Heavyweight Division)	2005			Final
26–3	Win	Fernando "Margarida" Pontes	Submission	World Jiu-Jitsu Championship	2005			
25–3	Win	Saulo Ribeiro	Submission	World Jiu-Jitsu Championship	2005			Semi-final
24–3	Win	Ronaldo Souza	Points	European Open Championship (Absolute Division)	2005			Final
23–3	Win	Roberto Abreu	Submission	European Open Championship	2005			
22–3	Win	Rodrigo Solueo	Submission	European Open Championship	2005			
21–3	Win	Ronaldo Souza	Submission (Rear Naked Choke)	ADCC Submission Wrestling World Championship (Absolute Division)	2005			Final
20–3	Win	Alexandre Ribeiro	Submission (Rear Naked Choke)	ADCC Submission Wrestling World Championship (Absolute Division)	2005			Semi-final
19–3	Win	Fabrício Werdum	Submission (Rear Naked Choke)	ADCC Submission Wrestling World Championship (Absolute Division)	2005			Quarter-final
18–3	Win	Shinya Aoki	Submission (Foot Lock)	ADCC Submission Wrestling World Championship (Absolute Division)	2005			Elimination Round
17–3	Win	Alexandre Ferreira	Submission (Quit on Stool)	ADCC Submission Wrestling World Championship (88–98 kg Division)	2005			Final
16–3	Win	Alexandre Ribeiro	Submission (Rear Naked Choke)	ADCC Submission Wrestling World Championship (88–98 kg Division)	2005			Semi-final
15–3	Win	Eduardo Telles	Submission (Armbar)	ADCC Submission Wrestling World Championship (88–98 kg Division)	2005			Quarter-final
14–3	Win	Justin Garcia	Submission (Rear Forearm Choke)	ADCC Submission Wrestling World Championship (88–98 kg Division)	2005			Elimination Round
13–3	Loss	Ronaldo Souza	Points	World Jiu-Jitsu Championship (Absolute Division)	2004			Final
13–2	Win	Rodrigo Medeiros	Submission (Rear Naked Choke)	World Jiu-Jitsu Championship (Super Heavyweight Division)	2004	Roger Gracie vs Rodrigo Medeiros		Final
12–2	Win	Fernando "Tererê" Augusto	Submission (Choke from Mount)	World Jiu-Jitsu Championship	2004			
11–2	Win	Marcelo Garcia	Points	World Jiu-Jitsu Championship (Absolute Division)	2004			
10–2	Win	Recardo Franco	Submission	World Jiu-Jitsu Championship (Super Heavy)	2004			
9–2	Win	Roberto Agnese	Submission	World Jiu-Jitsu Championship (Absolute Division)	2004			
8–2	Win	Leonardo Ramos	Submission	World Jiu-Jitsu Championship (Absolute Division)	2004			
7–2	Loss	Marcio Cruz	Points (3–0)	World Jiu-Jitsu Championship (Absolute Division)	2003			Final
7–1	Win	Alexandre Ribeiro		ADCC Submission Wrestling World Championship (88–98 kg Division)	2003			Third place match
6–1	Loss	Jon Olav Einemo		ADCC Submission Wrestling World Championship (88–98 kg Division)	2003			Semi-final
6–0	Win	Rigan Machado		ADCC Submission Wrestling World Championship (88–98 kg Division)	2003			Quarter-final
5–0	Win	Mario Sperry		ADCC Submission Wrestling World Championship (88–98 kg Division)	2003			Elimination Round
4–0	Win	Marcio Corleta	Points		?			
3–0	Win	Demian Maia	Points	Brazilian Teams Championship	2002			Roger: Brown Belt, Demian: Black Belt
2–0	Win	Ronaldo Souza		World Jiu-Jitsu Championship (Absolute Division)	2002			Brown Belt Final Match
1–0	Win	Rodrigo Asmus		World Jiu-Jitsu Championship (Heavyweight Division)	2002			Brown Belt Final Match

=== Mixed martial arts record ===
Professional record breakdown
10 matches	8 wins	2 losses
By knockout	1	1
By submission	6	0
By decision	1	1

Res.	Record	Opponent	Method	Event	Date	Round	Time	Location	Notes
Win	8–2	Michał Pasternak	Technical Submission (arm-triangle choke)	ONE: Ascent to Power	6 May 2016	1	2:13	Kallang, Singapore	Won the inaugural ONE Light Heavyweight Championship. Gracie vacated the title on October 14, 2017 after his retirement.
Win	7–2	James McSweeney	TKO (front kick and punches)	ONE FC: Warrior's Way	5 December 2014	3	3:15	Pasay, Philippines	Return to Light Heavyweight.
Loss	6–2	Tim Kennedy	Decision (unanimous)	UFC 162	6 July 2013	3	5:00	Las Vegas, Nevada, United States	
Win	6–1	Anthony Smith	Submission (arm-triangle choke)	Strikeforce: Marquardt vs. Saffiedine	12 January 2013	2	3:16	Oklahoma City, Oklahoma, United States	
Win	5–1	Keith Jardine	Decision (unanimous)	Strikeforce: Rockhold vs. Kennedy	14 July 2012	3	5:00	Portland, Oregon, United States	Middleweight debut.
Loss	4–1	Muhammed Lawal	KO (punches)	Strikeforce: Barnett vs. Kharitonov	10 September 2011	1	4:33	Cincinnati, Ohio, United States	
Win	4–0	Trevor Prangley	Submission (rear-naked choke)	Strikeforce: Diaz vs. Cyborg	29 January 2011	1	4:19	San Jose, California, United States	
Win	3–0	Kevin Randleman	Submission (rear-naked choke)	Strikeforce: Heavy Artillery	15 May 2010	2	4:10	St. Louis, Missouri, United States	
Win	2–0	Yuki Kondo	Submission (rear-naked choke)	World Victory Road Presents: Sengoku 2	18 May 2008	1	2:40	Tokyo, Japan	Light Heavyweight debut.
Win	1–0	Ron Waterman	Submission (armbar)	BodogFight: USA vs. Russia	2 December 2006	1	3:38	Vancouver, British Columbia, Canada	Heavyweight debut.

== Instructor lineage ==
Carlos Gracie Sr. → Hélio Gracie → Carlos Gracie Jr. → Roger Gracie

== See also ==
- List of Brazilian Jiu-Jitsu practitioners
- List of male mixed martial artists
- List of multi-sport athletes
- List of multi-sport champions
