= Alessandra Vieira =

Brazilian jiu-jitsu practitioner from Brazil

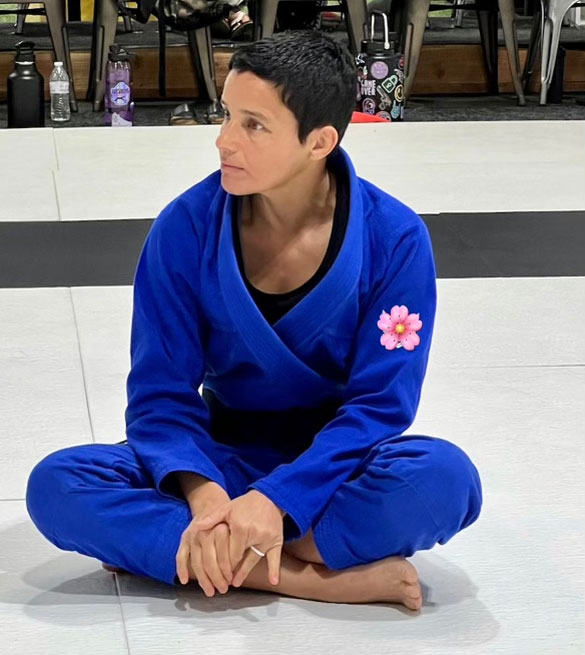
- Vieira in May 2022
- Born: Alessandra Vieira de Souza; March 14, 1976 (age 50); São Pedro dos Ferros; Minas Gerais, Brazil
- Other names: Alessandra Vieira Jamgochian
- Nickname: Leka
- Nationality: Brazilian / American
- Division: Feathereweight
- Style: Brazilian Jiu-Jitsu
- Team: Checkmat; Gracie Humaitá; Dojo/Machado
- Rank: 6th deg. BJJ black belt (Note: under Aloísio Silva)

Other information
- Occupation: BJJ instructor
- Website: checkmatvalencia

Alessandra "Leka" Vieira (born March 14, 1976) is a submission grappler and a 6th degree Brazilian jiu-jitsu practitioner and coach. Widely regarded as one of the pioneers of women's Brazilian jiu-jitsu, she became in 1999 the first-ever female black belt World champion.

Vieira is a three-time World champion, four-time Pan American champion (Note: 3 in the Adult black belt division, 1 in the Master 3 black belt division) as well as an ADCC Submission Fighting World Championship finalist, in 2022 she was inducted in the United States Martial Art Hall of Fame. As a 6th degree black belt, she is one of the highest ranked female jiu-jitsu practitioners in the United States.

== Career ==
Alessandra Vieira de Souza was born on March 14, 1976, in São Pedro dos Ferros, Minas Gerais, Brazil. At the age of 16, after an ACL injury forced her to take time away from handball, she started training Brazilian jiu-jitsu (BJJ) under Aloisio Silva, a Carlos Gracie's black belt, founder of Dojo jiu-jitsu and one of the first BJJ masters to teach women. She was promoted to blue belt after six months of training and two years later was a finalist at the 1994 Brazilian National Championship winning silver. She was promoted to black belt by Silva in 1998 then won the 1999 World Jiu-Jitsu Championship a year later, becoming the first female black belt world champion. (Note: The first IBJJF World Championship open to women took place in 1998, the unique female division, which merged all belts from blue to black, was won by purple belt Thaís Ramos.) She won silver at the 2000 World Championship in the featherweight division, (Note: Purple, brown and black adult female combined division) then the following year, she won gold at the Pan American Championship. In 2001 she was invited to help start a women's only class at Rigan Machado's academy which resulted in her move to California and representing Machado JJ in competition.

In 2002, Vieira won the World Championship and the Pan American in the same year. After promoting Cindy Omatsu in 2002, she became the first woman to promote another woman to BJJ black belt. (Note: Black Belt awarded together with Rigan Machado) She won the Pan championship again in 2003 in the featherweight division. In 2005, she faced Kyra Gracie in the ADCC Submission Fighting World Championship final losing on points after a 16-minute match for the woman's under 60 kilograms (130 lb) title that same year, representing Gracie Humaitá, Vieira won the World Championship for the third time after defeating Kyra Gracie in the lightweight final. (Note: Brown and black adult female division) In 2004, Vieira opened her own school out of Torrance, California. In 2015, she opened CheckMat Valencia an affiliate of Checkmat. In 2014, she became a member of Black Belt Magazine hall of fame after being chosen as Competitor of the Year.

In 2018, Vieira launched the Wonder Woman BJJ Project, a program to help promote and expand the role of women in jiu-jitsu. In 2019 Vieira returned to competition to win the Pan Masters championship in the featherweight division. In March 2022, she received her 6th degree from Léo Vieira, and was inducted in the United States Martial Art Hall of Fame.

== Championships and recognitions ==
=== Championships ===
Main Achievements:

- IBJJF World Champion (1999 / 2002 / 2005)
- IBJJF Pan American Champion (2001 / 2002 / 2003 / 2019 (Note: Master 3 black belt female featherweight division as Alessandra Vieira Jamgochian))
- 2nd Place IBJJF World Championship (2000)
- 2nd Place ADCC Submission Fighting World Championship (2005)
- 2nd Place Brazilian National Championship (1994)

=== Recognitions ===
- Black Belt Magazine hall of fame (2014 Competitor of the Year)
- United States Martial Art Hall of Fame (Silver Life Award 2022)

== Instructor lineage ==
Vieira's jiu-jitsu instructor lineage can be traced from Carlos Gracie Sr, one of the founders of the art, to Grand Master Aloísio Silva (7th degree):

Mitsuyo Maeda > Carlos Gracie Sr. > Robson Gracie > Aloísio Silva > Leka Vieira
