= John Will (fighter) =

Australian martial artist

John Will (born 16 April 1957) is a notable martial artist from Australia. Will won the Best Exponent Award in the first World Silat Championships in Jakarta in 1981. Will also completed his black belt in Brazilian Jiu Jitsu under Rigan Machado and Jean Jacques Machado in 1998, making him one of the first twelve foreign nationals to have earned a black belt in Brazilian Jiu Jitsu. On 14 September 2025, Will was awarded his 7th-degree coral belt by Rigan Machado, becoming the first Australian to attain this rank.

== Martial artist ==
Will's background includes training in Freestyle Wrestling, Goju Kai Karate, and Taekwondo, training with Benny Urquidez, Gene LeBell, Pete Cunningham, Rorion Gracie, Rickson Gracie and the Machado brothers, and teaching Shootfighting. During a trip to India, Will trained in the art of Vajra Mushti under the Jyesthimalla clan in Gujarat, India. Will is also credited with publishing a rare first-hand account of the ancient Indian martial art in Western media.

Will is noted for taking several overseas martial arts training trips each year and has been doing so since 1975, including training in Indonesia, Thailand, Hong Kong, Japan, the U.S. and Brazil. After receiving his Brazilian Jiu Jitsu black belt from Professor Rigan Machado in 1998, he became the national director of Machado Brazilian Jiu Jitsu in Australia. The organisation is the largest in the Australasian region (with over 70 member schools) and is known as BJJ Australasia. He teaches BJJ and Shoot fighting at his REDCAT Academy in Geelong. Will's regular schedule includes a wide-ranging seminar circuit spanning several countries and most Australian states.

Along with partner David Meyer (based in San Francisco), Will founded and authored a BJJ Curriculum (BJJ America) – providing more than 600 schools throughout the US with a means to facilitate their entry into the art of Brazilian Jiu Jitsu. More recently, he has tailored-designed various curricula for notable martial arts organisations, including Chuck Norris's UFAF (United Fighting Arts Federation).

Will teaches defensive tactics programs to various law enforcement and military agencies, including the Australian Federal Police, the Australian Defence Forces, the Marine Corps at Quantico in Virginia, USA and many others.

== Writing ==
Will is a self-published author with four instructional books directed at the Brazilian Jiu Jitsu and Self-defence market. His first three books are purely BJJ orientated and cover: Fundamentals, The Guard and Advanced Attacks & Escapes. His fourth Instructional Book is "Fight ~ Logic," that covers Will's passion for all aspects of the self-defence game, from Pre-Fight scenarios to taking the fight to the ground and conclusion.

Will's recent writing focus has been penning his autobiography, which was released as a 3-part series entitled Rogue Black Belt. The series focusses on a chronological set of life lessons. As with his instructional books, Will has published these works himself.

- Book 1: Rogue Black Belt: Fear & the Engine focuses on Will's early years growing up in Australia and the path leading him to the Martial Arts and Bali, and his Silat World Championship win in 1982.
- Book 2: Rogue Black Belt: Challenge & Ownership continues the story after the Bali years through the formation of Blitz Magazine in Australia and his subsequent travels to India, Thailand, Japan, the US, and Brazil. He interacts with some of martial arts' biggest legends and most famous practitioners there, leading to his discovery of Brazilian Jiu Jitsu.
- Book 3: Rogue Black Belt: Passion & Purpose will take Will's story from his fledgling BJJ and Defensive Tactics teachings to the full-blown instructor of today's instructors.

== Personal life ==
Will resides in Geelong, a large regional town in the southern Australian state of Victoria. He is married to Melissa Will.

== Instructor lineage ==
Kanō Jigorō → Tomita Tsunejirō → Mitsuyo "Count Koma" Maeda → Hélio Gracie → Rolls Gracie & Carlos "Carlinhos" Gracie Jr → Rigan Machado → John Will

== Notable students ==
- Elvis Sinosic – UFC Fighter
- Anthony Perosh – UFC Fighter
- George Sotiropoulos – UFC Fighter
- Adele Fornarino
