= Cindy Omatsu =

American martial artist

- Born: Cynthia Ann Omatsu; January 18, 1961 (age 65); Torrance, California
- Nationality: (United States) American
- Style: Brazilian Jiu-Jitsu
- Teachers: Rigan Machado, Leka Vieira
- Rank: Black Belt in Brazilian Jiu-Jitsu

Other information
- Occupation: Brazilian Jiu-Jitsu Instructor
- University: El Camino Junior College

Cynthia Ann “Cindy” Omatsu (born January 18, 1961 in Torrance, California) is a Japanese-American black belt in Brazilian Jiu-Jitsu under senior instructor Rigan Machado and Leka Vieira. She is best known for being the first Asian-American and first woman outside of Brazil to be promoted to black belt in Brazilian Jiu-Jitsu.

== Biography ==
Cindy was born and raised in Torrance, California the fourth of five children. She attended Madrona Middle school and Torrance High School. Later earning her Associate of Arts degree from El Camino Junior College.

Cindy has been training for over eleven years in Brazilian Jiu-Jitsu originally starting for self-defense purposes. She enrolled at Rigan Machado’s school in Redondo Beach, California eventually earning her black belt under Machado and Vieira. Initially hesitant about training due to the lack of female students she continued training eventually becoming the first Asian-American and first woman outside of Brazil to earn a black belt in the art.

== Career ==
Cindy is an instructor at Rigan Machado’s school in Redondo Beach and conducts seminars worldwide. In addition to training in Brazilian Jiu-Jitsu, Cindy has also trained in Jeet Kune Do under Richard Bustillo, boxing and kickboxing with June Castro, Krav Maga with Mitch Tavera, wrestling, and submission wrestling with Frank Trigg and Rico Chiparelli. In addition to teaching martial arts she is also an interviewer for the online magazine website GrappleTV.

Cindy is also well known for her four volume DVD instructional series “Vicious Vixens: Brazilian Jiu Jitsu” which also featured fellow Brazilian Jiu-Jitsu competitor Felicia Oh.

== Lineage ==
Jigoro Kano → Tsunejiro Tomita → Mitsuyo "Count Koma" Maeda → Carlos Gracie, Sr. → Carlos Gracie, Jr. → Rigan Machado → Cindy Omatsu

== DVD ==
- Vicious Vixens: Brazilian Jiu Jitsu (Panther Premium, 2005)
  - Volume One: Basic
  - Volume Two: Beginning
  - Volume Three: Intermediate
  - Volume Four: Advanced

== Titles ==
- IBJJF Pan American Jiu Jitsu Championships (Hawaii) First Place
- IBJJF Pan American Jiu Jitsu Championships (Florida) Third Place
