= Peter de Been =

Australian martial artist

- Nationality: Australian
- Division: Lightweight
- Style: Brazilian Jiu-Jitsu
- Fighting out of: Melbourne, Australia
- Team: de Been 100% Jiu-Jitsu
- Teacher: Carlos Gracie Jr.
- Rank: 6th degree Black Belt under Carlos Gracie Jr
- Years active: 1995 - 2005

Other information
- Notable club: Gracie Barra
- Website: https:debeenjiujitsu.com

Peter de Been is an Australian martial artist who helped pioneer the art of Brazilian Jiu-jitsu in Australia.

== Biography ==
De Been’s background includes time spent studying Wing Chun Kung Fu and Seido Karate. His interests would then move towards Penjak Silat and then Shoot Fighting.

In 1990 de Been travelled to Brazil with his Shoot Fighting instructor. During this time he spent six weeks training with Carlos Gracie Jr at the Gracie Barra Academy. De Been continued these training trips in 1991, 1992 and 1993.

In 1994 de Been established the Australian Federation of Brazilian Jiu Jitsu (AFBJJ). The goal of the federation being to help organize and regulate the sport to an international standard. The federation was modelled off of the Confederacao Brasileira de Jiu-Jitsu and following IBJJF guidelines.

In 1999 de Been travelled to the Pan-American Championships in Miami. As his weight division of Brown Belt 67–73 kg was already full he entered into the 73–79 kg category. De Been earned a bronze medal in a tough competition that resulted in him dislocating his shoulder. His efforts resulted in him being awarded his black belt from Carlos Gracie Jr.

In 2003 de Been was part of the Koral Team that competed in Desafio, an invitational Brazilian Jiujitsu competition organised by Victor Costa the owner of Koral Kimonos. The team would also include future legends such as Ronaldo Souza and Demian Maia. In 2004 he would join the team in Sao Paulo where he would win his match by clock choke earning himself a bonus for fastest submission of the competition.

== Brazilian jiu-jitsu lineage ==
Mitsuyo "Count Koma" Maeda → Carlos Gracie, Sr. → Carlos Gracie Jr → Peter de Been

== Main Achievements ==
=== Coloured Belts ===
- (silver) 1996 Pan Am Master Purple Belt Silver Medallist
- (gold) 1997 Pan Am Master Brown Belt Gold Medallist
- (bronze) 1998 Pan Am Adult Adult Brown Belt Bronze Medallist
- (bronze) 1999 Pan Am Adult Brown Belt Bronze Medallist

=== Black Belt ===
- (silver) 2000 World Master Black Belt Silver Medallist
- (bronze) 2001 Pan Am Adult Black Belt Bronze Medallist
- 2004 International Super Fight Sao Paulo Winner

== See also ==
- Pan-American Championship
- List of Brazilian jiu-jitsu practitioners
