= Marco Alvan =

Brazilian Jiu Jitsu practitioner

- Born: Rio de Janeiro, Brazil
- Style: Brazilian Jiu-Jitsu
- Teachers: Jorge Pina Barbosa, Carlos Gracie Jr, Carlos Augusto
- Rank: Black Belt in Brazilian Jiu-Jitsu

Other information
- Website: http://www.linkbjj.com

Marco Alvan is the head Brazilian jiu-jitsu instructor for Team Link in Ludlow, Massachusetts. Alvan already graduated several students to the rank of Black Belt Ricardo Funch, Brian American, Ron Kieltika, Adailton Reis, Philipe Dixon, Eric Marandino, Tony Lacaprucia, Bruno Rodrigues, Brent Kimberger.

Marco Alvan's father is from Peru, he trained judo from 8 to 15 years old and has been training in Brazilian jiu-jitsu since 1987 at age of 15. When he was a teenager, he had the privilege of training with Master Jorge Pina Barbosa. It was Jorge Pina who introduced Marco to the art of BJJ. Marco's brother brought him into the Gracie Barra school. At the Gracie Barra school he trained under Master Carlos Gracie, Jr. and trained alongside Ryan and Renzo Gracie. At the age of 19 years he joined the Brazilian Army and stopped training at Gracie Barra. However, as Jiu Jitsu gained popularity, a professor of the Gracie family opened a new location close to his home in Rio de Janeiro. The head trainer at this academy was Master Carlos Augusto, a 4th degree black belt under Grandmaster Reylson Gracie.

Alvan is a third degree black belt in Brazilian jiu-jitsu under Master Carlos Augusto. He teaches at various Team Link schools throughout New England.

== Grappling credentials ==
- 4th Degree IBJJF Black Belt - Team Link Head Coach
- Top 100 Best MMA Coach of the World by UFC Magazine
- 2015 IBJJF Black Belt Master 3 Black Belt Boca Raton Open Champion
- 2015 IBJJF Black Belt Master 3 Black Belt Boston Open Champion
- 2015 IBJJF Black Belt Master 3 Black Belt NY Open Champion
- 2006 Hall of Fame Instructor of the Year
- 2009 Naga Expert Division Champion
- 2009 IBJJF Black Belt New York Open Champion
- 2011 Naga New England Expert Division Champion
- 2011 IBJJF Black Belt Boston Open Champion
- 2011 IBJJF Pan American NO GI Black Belt Champion
- Coach of 22 Time Naga Best Overall Team
- Coach of 2014 New England Kids & Adults Overall Team Champions
- Coach of 2012 Naga East Coast Kids Overall Team Champions
- Coach of 2012 Naga Hartford Kids Overall Team Champions
- Coach of Naga 2011 Kids Overall Team Champions
- Coach of Grapplers Quest 2011 Kids Overall Team Champions
