= Carlos Machado (fighter) =

Brazilian martial artist

- Born: November 9, 1963 (age 62); Rio de Janeiro, Brazil
- Style: Carlos Mahcado Jiu-Jitsu
- Teachers: Carlos Gracie, Rolls Gracie, Carlos Gracie, Jr.
- Rank: 8th deg. BJJ coral belt

Other information
- Notable students: Chuck Norris, Travis Lutter, Stephen "Wonderboy" Thompson, Anthony Perosh, Elvis Sinosic, Johnny Lee Smith, Daniel O'Brien, Rafael Lovato Sr., Rafael Lovato Jr, Brandon McCaghren, Johnny Hernandez
- Website: http://www.cmjjassociation.com

Carlos Machado (born November 9, 1963) is a former world master's champion in Brazilian jiu-jitsu (BJJ) born in Rio de Janeiro, Brazil. He is the eldest of the five Machado Brothers, known for BJJ, that also includes Roger, Rigan, Jean Jacques and John. He is also the brother-in-law of UFC fighter Stephen Thompson. He currently runs BJJ schools across the United States, Australia, Canada and Mexico.

== Early life ==
Carlos started martial arts at the age of four. His main instructor throughout his life was his cousin Carlos Gracie, Jr. but he has also trained with Helio Gracie, Carlson Gracie, Rolls Gracie, Rickson Gracie, Crolin Gracie, Rillion Gracie and his brothers. While in Brazil, he successfully competed and was champion for 10 years straight in competition at the State and National level which at the time was equivalent to the Worlds as BJJ had not spread to the masses yet. He competed and won against many of today's top founders of BJJ teams. He believes BJJ is the greatest addition to modern martial arts. Carlos also lived with his Uncle Carlos Gracie, founder of Brazilian Jiu-Jitsu and Carlos greatest mentor, for 5 years while attending and eventually graduating from Law School.

== Career in the U.S. ==
Carlos was teaching in America as early as 1990. In April 1994 he moved to Los Angeles, California. There he met martial arts movie star Chuck Norris, who was instrumental in promoting Brazilian Jiu-Jitsu and the Machado family. Since then, Mr. Norris has been one of the greatest advocates of Machado Brazilian jiu-jitsu. Carlos lived in Los Angeles until the end of 1995, when he moved to the city of Dallas, Texas. There he taught Brazilian jiu-jitsu out of the same building in which Chuck Norris's television show "Walker, Texas Ranger" was filmed. That allowed Machado not only to teach at his studio but also to take part in many episodes of that popular show. He often assisted on choreographing fight scenes with Brazilian Jiu-Jitsu.

Besides running his school, Machado has been involved in competition, winning the Pan American of Brazilian jiu-jitsu (97/98), he also won several super fights in the U.S. (U.S Open 98/99), he competed in ADCC with a broken foot and still placed and earned the award of fastest submission in 1998, and the World Master's Championships (2000) in two weight divisions (middleweight and open class). After an impressive 34-year competition career he retired from the competition arena winning the Worlds.

He currently holds the highest rank of this style in the Southwest (Eighth Degree Black Belt). Carlos Machado is considered the "godfather" of Brazilian jiu-jitsu in Texas. Carlos has built one of the fastest-growing affiliate school programs in the world. The Carlos Machado Jiu-Jitsu Association has affiliates and representatives throughout the United States, including Louisiana, Texas, Oklahoma, Florida, Missouri, Pennsylvania, North Carolina, South Carolina, New York, Rhode Island, Mississippi, Georgia, Iowa, Michigan, Minnesota, Montana, Nebraska, New Mexico, and Tennessee. The association also has an international presence in England, France, Australia, Canada, Brazil, Mexico, Guam, and the Dominican Republic. Carlos has also been inducted into no less than eight Martial Arts Hall of Fame organizations for different contributions to the world of Martial Arts and Brazilian Jiu-Jitsu.

The headquarters of Carlos Machado Jiu-Jitsu has operated in Dallas, Texas, for over 30 years and is recognized as one of the premier Brazilian Jiu-Jitsu academies in the state. Carlos has also been inducted into at least eight Martial Arts Hall of Fame organizations for his contributions to Brazilian Jiu-Jitsu and martial arts as a whole.

Machado served as a coach on season 7 of the Professional Grappling Federation on November 3 to 8, 2024, alongside Dean Lister, Pedro Sauer, and Roger Gracie. Machado led the Intrana team.

== Media and Other Projects ==
Carlos Machado has appeared in various forms of media, most notably through his collaboration with Chuck Norris on the television series Walker, Texas Ranger, where he assisted with fight choreography and made guest appearances. He also served as a coach during Season 7 of the Professional Grappling Federation in 2024, leading Team Intrana alongside Dean Lister, Pedro Sauer, and Roger Gracie.

In addition to his teaching and competition legacy, Machado is the host of the podcast Coffee Time with Carlos Machado, where he shares personal insights, stories from his journey in Brazilian Jiu-Jitsu, and interviews with martial arts experts and influencers.

== Tactical Training ==
In addition to his work in Brazilian Jiu-Jitsu for sport and self-development, Carlos Machado also provides specialized tactical training through his program, Carlos Machado Tactical. This system is designed for law enforcement, military personnel, and security professionals, focusing on practical grappling, control, and defensive tactics that translate to real-world situations.

== Instructor lineage ==
Kano Jigoro → Tomita Tsunejiro → Mitsuyo Maeda → Carlos Gracie. and Hélio Gracie → Rolls Gracie and Carlos Gracie Jr. → Carlos Machado

== See also ==
- List of Brazilian Jiu-Jitsu practitioners
