= Romero Cavalcanti =

Brazilian martial artist

- Born: October 22, 1952 (age 73); Rio de Janeiro, Brazil
- Other names: Jacaré
- Style: Gracie Jiu-Jitsu
- Teachers: Rolls Gracie, Rickson Gracie, Helio Gracie
- Rank: 8th deg. BJJ coral belt

Other information
- Notable students: Fabio Gurgel; Rubens Charles Maciel; Marcelo Garcia; Leonardo Vieira; Matt Larsen
- Website: http://www.alliancebjj.com/

Romero Cavalcanti (born October 22, 1952) is a Brazilian Jiu-Jitsu master and the founder of Alliance Jiu Jitsu. He is one of the six men who were promoted to black belt by Rolls Gracie prior to his fatal 1982 hang gliding accident. Romero has coached many of today's top competitors and coaches, and was a significant influence on the US Army Combatives Program through his student Matt Larsen. Cavalcanti is a member of the IBJJF Hall of Fame.

== Biography ==
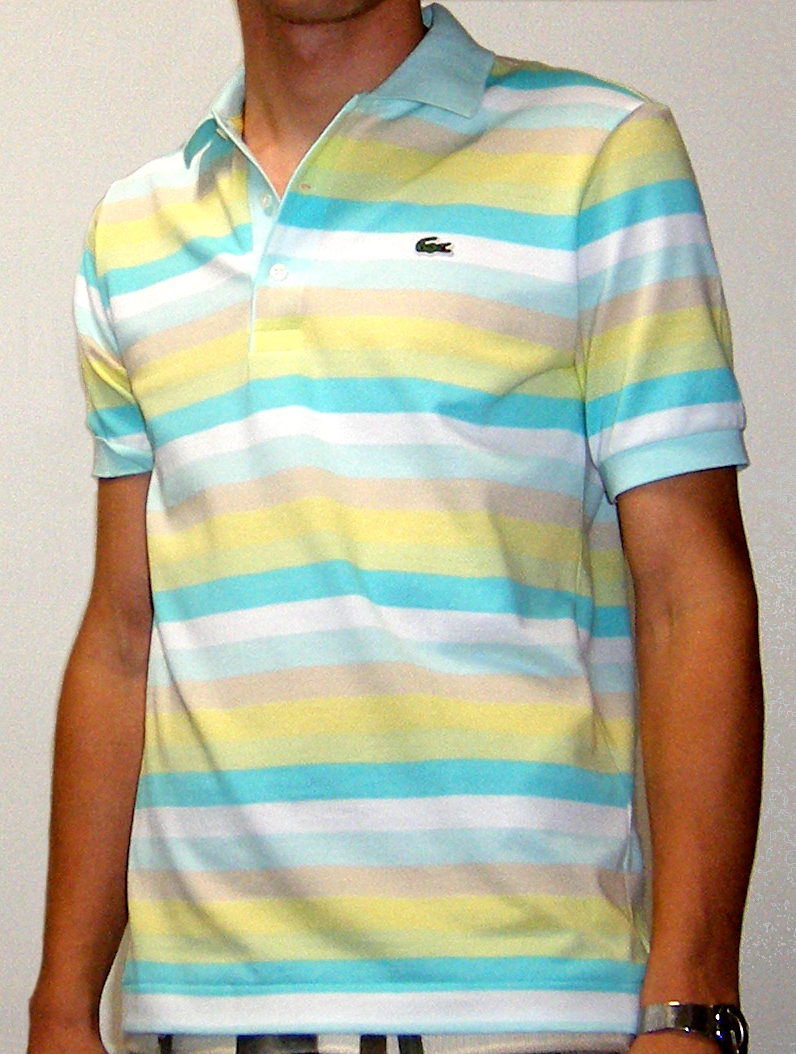
Wearing the iconic Lacoste tennis shirts inspired Romero's nickname Jacaré

Romero began training in Brazilian Jiu Jitsu at age 11. He was nicknamed Jacaré because he used to wear Lacoste polo shirts in his youth. By the age of 16, Romero regularly attended jiu jitsu classes at the famous Gracie School in Copacabana where he grew up, alongside Carlos Gracie, Jr., Crolin Gracie, Mario Claudio Tallarico, Fábio Santos, Mauricio Motta Gomes, the Machados, and Rickson Gracie. After extensive competition from 1972 to 1985 and working as an assistant instructor at the Gracie school, Romero opened his first school in Ipanema, Brazil. Romero had studied in New York in the 1970s, and in 1995 he moved back to the US with his family and opened a Brazilian Jiu Jitsu school in Miami. He later moved to Atlanta where he established a school in late 1996.

== Instructor lineage ==
Kano Jigoro → Tomita Tsunejiro → Mitsuyo "Count Koma" Maeda → Carlos Gracie, Sr. → Helio Gracie → Rolls Gracie → Romero "Jacaré" Cavalcanti

== See also ==
- List of Brazilian Jiu-Jitsu practitioners
