= Vinicius Magalhães =

Vinicius Magalhães may refer to:

- Vinny Magalhães, Vinny "Pezao" Magalhães, Brazilian Light Heavyweight mixed martial artist that competed on "The Ultimate Fighter" Season 8
- Vinicius Magalhães (Draculino), Vinicius "Draculino" Magalhães, Brazilian Featherweight mixed martial artist and jiu-jitsu instructor
