= Mauricio Gomes =

Brazilian jiu-jitsu practitioner from Brazil

- Born: Maurício Motta Gomes; 25 July 1955 (age 71); Rio de Janeiro, Brazil
- Nickname: Maurição (Note: The nickname "Maurição" means Big Maurício.)
- Style: Brazilian Jiu-Jitsu
- Teachers: Rolls Gracie; Carlos Gracie, Jr. João Alberto Barreto
- Rank: 8th deg. BJJ coral belt under Rolls Gracie & Carlos Gracie Jr.

Other information
- Occupation: BJJ instructor
- Spouse: Reila Gracie (m. 1979, divorced): Natalie Day
- Children: Roger Gracie
- Website: mauriciogomesbjj

Maurício Motta Gomes (born 25 July 1955), also known as Maurição, is a practitioner of Brazilian Jiu-Jitsu holding the rank of 8th degree white and red belt. The founder of the first Gracie Barra franchise in the United Kingdom, Gomes has been training and teaching BJJ for over 50 years, one of only six people promoted to black belt by legendary Rolls Gracie. Gomes is the father of Roger Gracie, one of the most accomplished jiu-jitsu competitors of all time.

== Career ==
Maurício Motta Gomes started training Brazilian jiu-jitsu aged four, after his father, a BJJ brown belt, took him to classes at João Alberto Barreto's academy. As a teenager, Gomes began training with the legendary Rolls Gracie. Under Gracie's guidance, he became a highly successful competitor winning the absolute division of the Rio de Janeiro State Championships in 1981. Shortly after this victory Gracie awarded Gomes his black belt in November 1981. Gomes continued training with Gracie until his tragic death in 1982.

Gomes opened the first Gracie Barra school in 1997 in Tokyo and was the first Brazilian to be invited to Japan to teach. After staying there for a year, he returned to Brazil before accepting a position in England. Gomes set up Gracie Barra UK, teaching in Birmingham, London, Edinburgh and Belfast. Gomes brought over Felipe Souza, Braulio Estima, and his son Roger Gracie to help with the teaching in England. Estima later become the main instructor at Gracie Barra Birmingham. In 2000 Gomes was invited to lead the BJJ class at the Budokwai in London. In 2004 his son opened the Roger Gracie Brazilian Jiu Jitsu Academy where he joined the teaching staff. In 2005 Gomes promoted his first UK students to black belt Jude Samuel, the first home-grown British black belt, Rick Young, and Marc Walder. In 2002 together with his son, Gomes established the first Gracie Barra Jiu Jitsu School in Shanghai, China. Because of his efforts to grow the sport in the country, Gomes is affectionately known as the ‘Godfather of British Jiu-Jitsu’.

== Personal life ==
Through his close ties with the Gracie family, Gomes met Reila Gracie, the daughter of Carlos Gracie Sr. They married in 1979 and had a daughter, Vanessa, and a son, Roger. Roger Gracie would go on to become a ten-time World Champion, opting to use the Gracie name from his mother's side. Gomes and Reila Gracie divorced, and Gomes now lives in the UK.

== Instructor lineage ==
Kano Jigoro → Tomita Tsunejiro → Mitsuyo "Count Koma" Maeda → Carlos Gracie, Sr. → Helio Gracie → Rolls Gracie → Mauricio Motta Gomes
