= Rodrigo Medeiros =

Brazilian martial artist

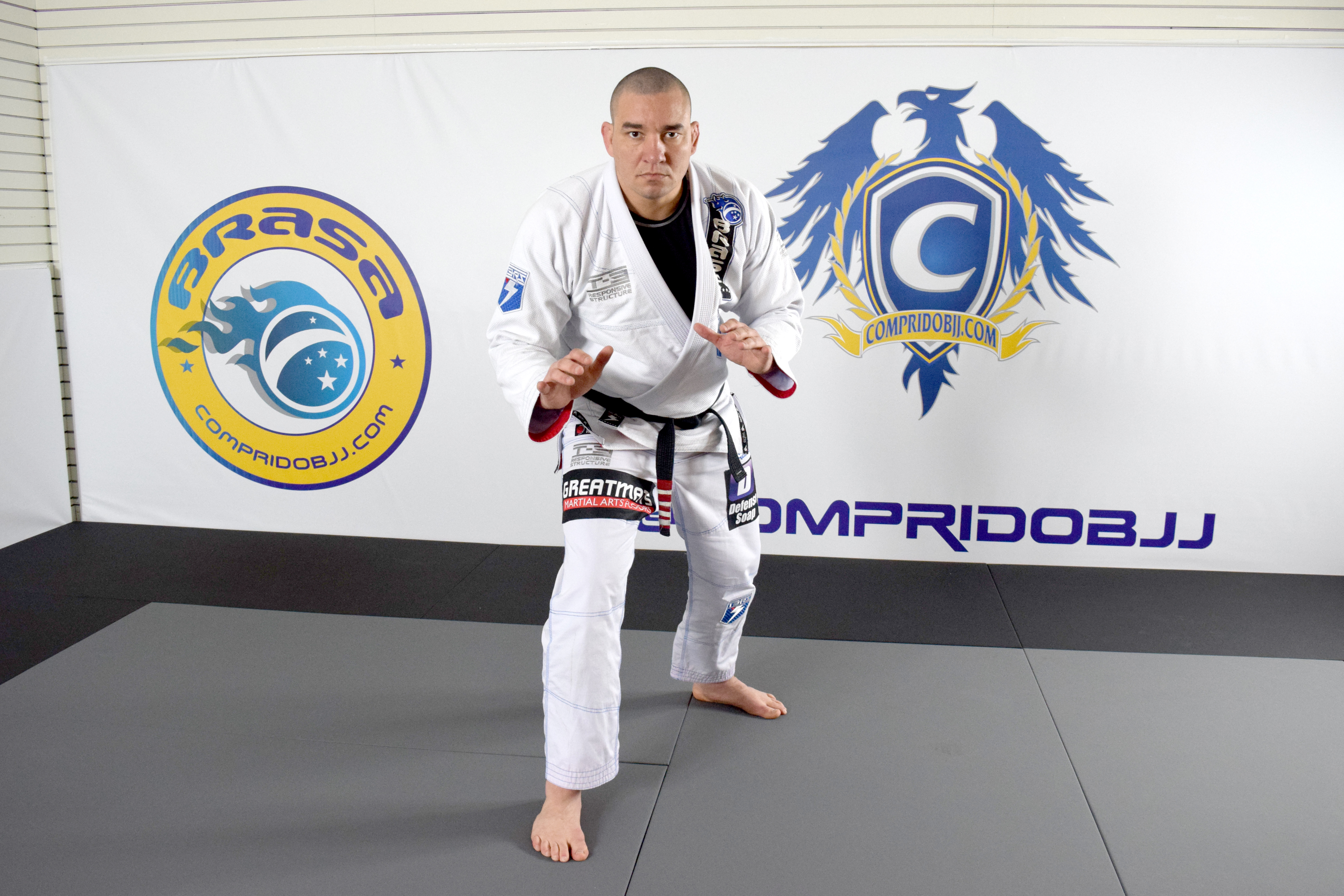
- Rodrigo "Comprido" Medeiros at his Comprido BJJ Academy in Bloomingdale, Illinois on April 28, 2017
- Born: Rodrigo Medeiros; January 11, 1977 (age 49); Rio de Janeiro, Brazil
- Other names: Comprido
- Height: 6 ft 3 in (1.91 m)
- Weight: 215 lb (98 kg; 15.4 st)
- Division: Super heavyweight
- Style: Brazilian jiu-jitsu
- Team: Comprido BJJ / Brasa
- Rank: 6th degree black belt in BJJ
- Years active: 1998–present

Rodrigo "Comprido" Medeiros (born January 11, 1977) is a Brazilian jiu-jitsu black belt and submission grappler. Medeiros is a two-time openweight World Jiu-Jitsu Champion. Medeiros has been a Jiu-Jitsu instructor to many notable mixed martial arts fighters such as former UFC Heavyweight Champion Brock Lesnar, former Bellator Heavyweight Champions Cole Konrad, Pat Barry, and Chris Tuchscherer.

== Biography ==
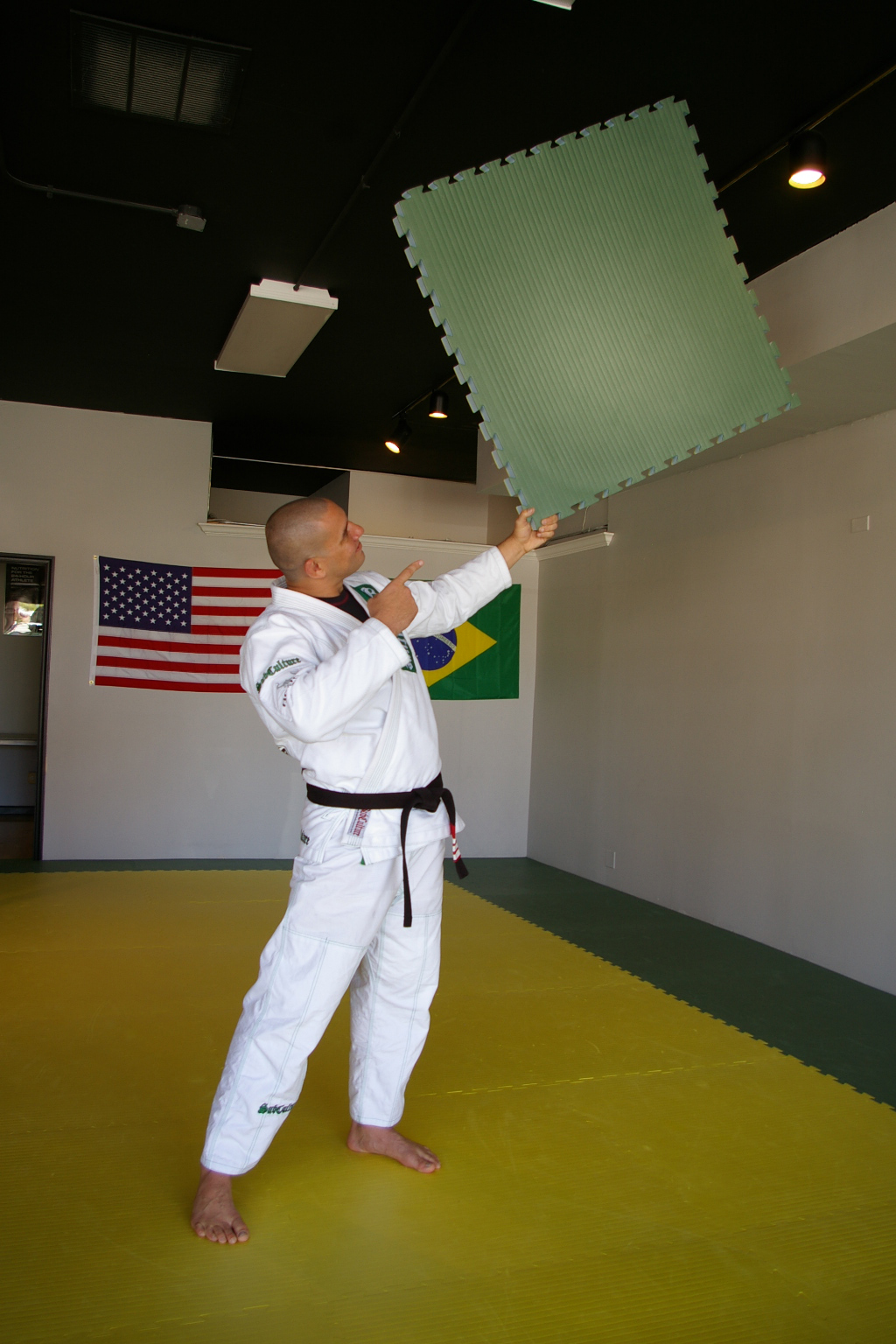
7-Time World BJJ Champion Rodrigo "Comprido" Medeiros at his academy in 2011 talking about Greatmats Grappling MMA Mat 1-5/8 Inch.

Comprido is one of the founding members of Brasa Academy.

Comprido is often confused with the Carlson Gracie Sr Black Belt leader of the BJJ Revolution team Rodrigo Medeiros.

He currently resides in the Chicago area and owns and teaches at Comprido BJJ, a Brasa school, in Bloomingdale, Illinois.

Comprido founded the Brasa Jiu Jitsu camp in Buzios, Rio de Janeiro along with friend and student Felipe Costa.

Comprido has been one of the first elite Brazilian jiu-jitsu competitors to speak out against the widespread use of steroids at the top level of the sport.

On August 9, 2014, Comprido fought Saulo Ribeiro in a grappling match in Metamoris IV. The fight ended in a draw.

Comprido earned the first ever submission in an IBJJF absolute black belt match when he defeated Roberto "Roleta" Magalhaes in the 1999 World Championships Finals. The 18-second fight is also the fastest submission in a black belt world championship final.

Comprido earned seven Brazilian jiu-jitsu world titles - 4 in the IBJJF and 3 in the CBJJO - between 1999 and 2006.

In 2006, he began training UFC fighter Brock Lesnar and opened his own academy in 2011 under Lesnar's encouragement. It was at that time he became a spokesman for Greatmats, an online retailer of martial arts mats.

Comprido has trained several world champions including Lesnar (UFC Heavyweight), Maia (ADCC), Cole Konrad (Bellator Heavyweight), Caio Terra (IBJJF), Roberto Traven (IBJJF), Felipe Costa (IBJJF), Dean Lister (ADCC) and Jessica Buchman (IBJJF). Daniel Taylor (World Tae Kwon Do Federation)

== Instructor Lineage ==
Mitsuyo 'Count Koma' Maeda → Carlos Gracie, Sr. → Helio Gracie → Rolls Gracie → Romero Cavalcanti → Rodrigo 'Comprido' Mederios

== Black Belt Degrees ==
1st Degree (2002)

2nd Degree (2005)

3rd Degree (2008)

4th Degree Presented by IBJJF (2013)

5th Degree Presented by Roberto Traven (2018)

6th Degree Presented by Fernando Gurgel (2023)

== Championships and accomplishments ==
=== CBJJ World Championships ===
2007

- Black Belt -97 kg: 3rd place

2006

- Black Belt -97 kg: 3rd place

2005

- Black Belt -97 kg: 3rd place

2004

- Black Belt -97 kg: 2nd Place

2003

- Black Belt -91 kg: 3rd place

2001

- Black Belt Open Weight: 3rd place
- Black Belt -91 kg: 2nd place

2000

- Black Belt -97 kg: 3rd place
- Black Belt Open Weight: 1st Place

1999

- Black Belt Open Weight: 1st Place

=== CBJJ Pan American Championships ===
2007

- Black Belt +97 kg: 1st place

2004

- Black Belt -91 kg: 2nd place

2002

- Black Belt -97 kg: 2nd place

=== CBJJO Copa do Mundo Championships ===
2006

- Black Belt -97 kg: 1st place

2003

- Black Belt -91 kg: 2nd place

2002

- Black Belt -91 kg: 1st place
