= Márcio Stambowsky =

Brazilian jiu-jitsu practitioner from Brazil

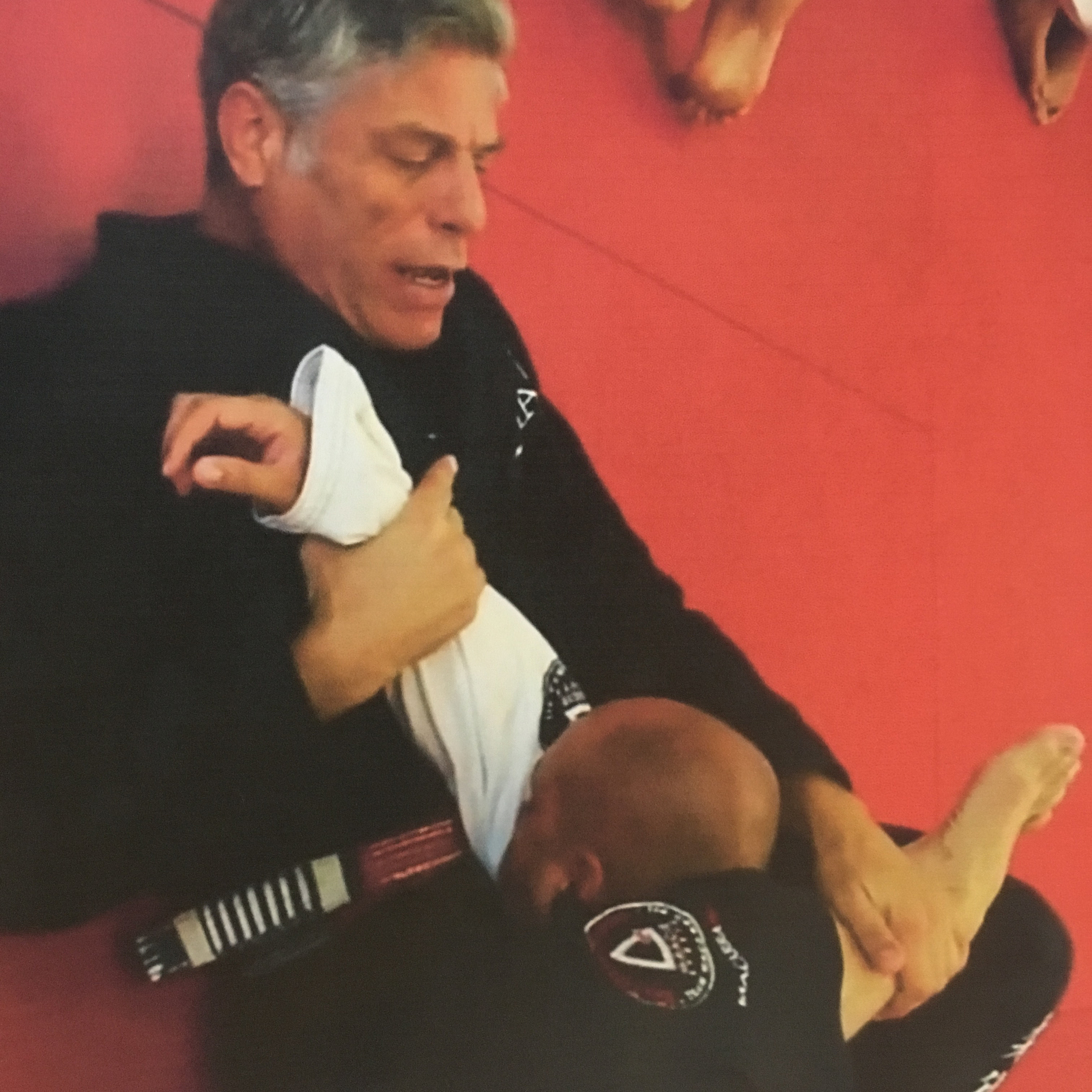
- Macarrão applies the triangle choke.
- Born: February 22, 1959; Rio de Janeiro, Brazil
- Died: April 2, 2026 (aged 67); Connecticut, US
- Other names: Macarrão; Macarra
- Style: Brazilian Jiu-Jitsu
- Teacher: Rolls Gracie
- Rank: 8th deg. BJJ coral belt (under Rolls Gracie & Carlos Gracie Jr.)

Other information
- Notable relatives: Gracie family Carla Gracie (wife); Neiman Gracie (son); Deborah Gracie (daughter)

Márcio "Macarrão" Stambowsky (Brazilian Portuguese pronunciation: [ˈmaɾsi.u stɐ̃ˈbowski]; February 22, 1959 – April 2, 2026) was a Brazilian martial artist. An 8th degree coral belt in Gracie Jiu-Jitsu, he was one of the "Famous Five" Rolls Gracie black belts and is regarded as one of the top Brazilian competitors of the 1980s. Stambowsky was also the father of professional Bellator MMA fighter Neiman Gracie Stambowsky.

== Technical contributions ==
During the formative years of Brazilian Jiu-Jitsu, Stambowsky was notable for revolutionizing the closed guard, triangles, and leglock tactics. He was named by MMA hall-of-famer Rickson Gracie as one of the original Brazilian competitors to popularize the concept of the now iconic triangle choke. Acclaimed as an influential mentor and coach, he has been credited by world champion Renzo Gracie for practicing "one of the most beautiful jiu jitsu [styles] ever seen."

== Athletic achievements ==
In 1980, Stambowsky was selected to join a group of top fighters that the Brazilian government planned to send to the Olympic Games in Moscow and the Pan American Games in the United States. Although a dispute involving sponsors prevented the team from traveling to the Olympics, Stambowsky went on to win two gold medals in national championship competitions in 1981 and 1985.

He won a bronze medal in a world championship competition, representing Brazil among 37 countries at the 1985 Maccabiah Games in Israel.

== Personal life ==
Marcio was born to a Holocaust survivor mother and a Russian father who later emigrated to Brazil. He was in his time the highest ranking Jewish BJJ practitioner and Jewish martial artist. Keeping close ties with the Gracies, Stambowsky eventually married Carla Gracie, daughter of Robson Gracie. In addition to his son Neiman, he had one daughter, Deborah Gracie Stambowsky, who, together with Kyra Gracie, is one of only two women in the Gracie family to have attained the rank of black belt. Stambowsky moved his family from Brazil to the United States in 2007. He was the founder of Gracie Sports USA and Team Macarra BJJ, based in Norwalk, Connecticut.

== Lineage ==
Kano Jigoro → Tomita Tsunejiro → Mitsuyo Maeda → Carlos Gracie → Hélio Gracie → Rolls Gracie → Márcio Stambowsky →

== See also ==
- Rolls Gracie
- Neiman Gracie
- Gracie family
- Brazilian Jiu-Jitsu
- List of Brazilian Jiu-Jitsu practitioners
