= Vinicius Magalhães (Draculino) =

Brazilian practitioner of Brazilian Jiu-Jitsu and mixed martial arts

Vinicius Magalhaes
- Born: July 30, 1971 (age 55); Rio de Janeiro, Brazil
- Other names: Draculino
- Height: 5 ft 7 in (1.70 m)
- Weight: 146 lb (66 kg; 10.4 st)
- Division: 145
- Fighting out of: Belo Horizonte, Brazil
- Team: Gracie Barra Combat Team
- Rank: 7th degree black belt. BJJ Coral Belt Brazilian Jiu-Jitsu
- Years active: 2003-present

Mixed martial arts record
- Total: 3
- Wins: 2
- By submission: 1
- By decision: 1
- Losses: 1
- By knockout: 1

Other information
- Mixed martial arts record from Sherdog
- Last updated on: 8/20/2010

Vinicius Bittencourt Almeida Magalhães (born July 30, 1971) is a Brazilian Jiu-Jitsu seventh degree black belt under Carlos Gracie, Jr. and also at the same time a brown belt in Judo, and a Muay Thai expert. He has been teaching Brazilian Jiu-Jitsu for over 18 years. He has instructed mixed martial arts and grappling champions. Draculino has produced such talent as Joaquim Ferreira, Romulo Barral, Alberto Crane, Marcelo Azevedo, Cristiano Titi, and Samuel Braga..

Draculino grew up with Ryan Gracie, Ralph Gracie, and Renzo Gracie, taking classes under both Jean Jacques Machado and Carlos Gracie, Jr. at the original Gracie Barra Academy. He began competition early, earning championships from the blue belt upwards. In 2007, Draculino, Ryan Gracie, and Roberto Gordo founded Gracie Fusion MMA team. The unexpected death of Ryan put the fledgling team in question, but Draculino and Gordo kept the team active in tribute to Ryan's memory.

Vinicius previously signed a two-fight contract with Strikeforce, and won his debut fight via decision against Rocky Long. He never completed his contract, as Strikeforce ceased operations in 2013.

He is currently the Regional Director for Gracie Barra Texas.

== Competitive accomplishments ==
- 4x Pan American Champion (once in the master division)
- Pan American No-Gi Champion in master division
- 2x Brazilian National Champion
- 2x Silver Medalist of World BJJ Championships
- No-Gi International Master and Senior Champion
- Abu-Dhabi Contender

Along with Renzo Gracie, he is regarded as one of the early innovators of the Spider guard and among the first participants to use it successfully in competition. The spider guard later became a widely used position in BJJ with numerous sweeps, submissions and variations that come from it.

== Instructor lineage ==
Mitsuyo Maeda → Carlos Gracie, Sr. → Helio Gracie → Carlos Gracie Jr. → Vinicius Magalhães

== Mixed martial arts record ==
Professional record breakdown
3 matches	2 wins	1 loss
By knockout	0	1
By submission	1	0
By decision	1	0

Res.	Record	Opponent	Method	Event	Date	Round	Time	Location	Notes
Win	2–1	Rocky Long	Decision (unanimous)	Strikeforce: Houston	August 21, 2010	3	3:00	Houston, Texas, United States	
Loss	1–1	Fábio Mello	TKO (cut)	Storm Samurai 8	July 2, 2005	1	N/A	Brasília, Brazil	
Win	1–0	Kleber Gaudino	Submission (arm-triangle choke)	Heat FC 2: Evolution	December 18, 2003	1	4:55	Natal, Rio Grande do Norte, Brazil	
