= Machado family =

Family of Brazilian Jiu-Jitsu practitioners

- Current region: United States
- Origin: Rio de Janeiro, Rio de Janeiro, Brazil
- Members: Carlos Machado; Rigan Machado; Jean Jacques Machado
- Connected families: Gracie
- Traditions: Brazilian Jiu-Jitsu

The Machado Family (also known as the Machado Brothers) are a family of Brazilian jiu-jitsu practitioners, mixed martial artists and grapplers. They are the founders of RCJ Machado Brazilian Jiu-Jitsu and are cousins to members of the Gracie family.

== Family connection to Gracie family ==
Their familial ties to the Gracies are through their mother's sister Layr, who was married to Carlos Gracie, making them first cousins to Carlos Gracie, Jr. and his siblings, and affinal cousins to the rest of the second generation of Gracie martial artists. Along with their Gracie cousins, the Machados are pioneers of Brazilian Jiu-Jitsu in the United States. They are according to age, Carlos, Roger, Rigan, Jean Jacques and John. The Machados have opened Brazilian jiu-jitsu schools throughout the United States.

The Machados were taught mainly by their cousin Carlos Jr., his half-brother Rolls Gracie, and Carlos and Rolls' father, Carlos Gracie. The brothers also trained with other notable members of the Gracie family, including Helio, Carlson, Rickson, Renzo, Crolin and Rilion. From there the Machados would develop a Brazilian jiu-jitsu that would be called RCJ Machado Brazilian jiu-jitsu. Carlos opened schools throughout the United States, as well as in Mexico, England, France, and Australia. Jean Jacques, Roger, and Rigan currently run schools in California. John Machado left California in 2014 and opened a school in Allen, Texas that same year.

== Competitions ==
They are known for their success in Pan American Games, ADCC Submission Wrestling World Championship, Brazilian National Jiu-Jitsu Championship, Brazilian jiu-jitsu American Championships, and Rio de Janeiro Jiu-Jitsu State Championships. The most recent family champions have been Rigan Machado, Jean Jacques Machado and Carlos Machado. The most successful Machados in Brazilian jiu-jitsu Competition are Rigan Machado and Jean Jacques Machado, who is a multiple time ADCC Submission Wrestling World Championship medalist (Gold, Silver(X2)).

== Teaching and training ==
The family now trains BJJ competitors and mixed martial arts fighters in organizations such as UFC, WEC, and Strikeforce. As a family, they have trained numerous BJJ competition champions. Carlos currently trains UFC welterweight Stephen Thompson and has awarded black belts to former UFC Middleweight Contender Travis Lutter and BJJ Champion Rafael Lovato Jr. Rigan has awarded black belts to notable students Erik Paulson, Dan Inosanto, Josh Barnett (2nd Degree) Jair Muniz and Chuck Norris. Additionally, Rigan Machado was one of the original teachers in Rorion Gracie's garage in Torrance, CA in the early days of Brazilian jiu-jitsu in America and has awarded black belts to 6 of the original "dirty dozen" (the first 12 non-Brazilian students to receive black belts in the art). These notable members of the "Dirty Dozen" include John Will, Bob Bass, Chris Haueter, IBJJF Senior Division/Pan American Champion David Meyer, Rick Williams and Rick Minter. Jean-Jacques had also helped in awarding black belts to John Will and Dan Inosanto with Rigan, and has also awarded black belts to "no gi" proponent Eddie Bravo, comedian & UFC commentator Joe Rogan, Women's World champion Felicia Oh, and former UFC heavyweight champion Ricco Rodriguez.

=== Machado Jiu-Jitsu ===
The Brazilian Jiu Jitsu style of the Machado family differs from the Gracie style, as it is more physical and it focuses more on blocking and positioning the opponent on the ground rather than submitting him. The practitioner's position start mostly from a standing position to execute efficient and fluid movements more easily and uses a variety of active guards and open guards. Its built primarily on offensive techniques, and most of them are based on takedowns (like double-leg and single-leg), trips and sweeps.

== Instructor lineage ==
Jigoro Kano → Tsunejiro Tomita → Mitsuyo Maeda → Carlos Gracie → Helio Gracie → Rolls Gracie → Carlos Gracie Jr. → Machado family

== Family members ==
- Carlos Machado - 8th Degree Red & White belt. Oldest of the five brothers.
- Roger Machado - 7th Degree Red & Black Belt. Second oldest among the brothers. Roger is an avid yoga practitioner and is considered to be the "zen master" of the family.
- Rigan Machado - 8th Degree Red & White Belt. Third oldest of the five brothers. From the age of 14 through 21, Rigan won the Brazilian National Championships every year and in every belt division.
- Jean Jacques Machado - 7th Degree Red & Black Belt. Fourth oldest of the five brothers. He held the Rio de Janeiro Jiu-Jitsu State Championships Cruiser Weight Champion and Brazilian jiu-jitsu National Championships Cruiser Weight Champion from 1982 to 1992. He is a multiple time ADCC Champion.
- John Machado - 7th Degree Red & Black Belt. Youngest of the five brothers.

== Film and television ==
The Machado family has worked in the film and television industry acting and choreographing fight scenes. In 2003 all five brothers starred together in the straight to video release Brazilian Brawl. The Machado brothers have helped train actors Ashton Kutcher and Keanu Reeves for his role in John Wick 2.

== See also ==
- Gracie family
- Brazilian Jiu-Jitsu
- List of notable Brazilian Jiu-Jitsu practitioners
