= 1999 World Jiu-Jitsu Championship =

Brazilian Jiu-Jitsu competitions

- Venue: Tijuca Tênis Clube
- Location: Rio de Janeiro, Brazil
- Dates: 1 April 1999
- Website: IBJJF

The 1999 World Jiu-Jitsu Championship, commonly known as the 1999 Mundials or Worlds, was an international Brazilian jiu-jitsu event organised by the International Brazilian Jiu-Jitsu Federation (IBJFF) and held at the Tijuca Tênis Clube in Rio de Janeiro, Brazil on 1 April 1999.

== Teams results ==
Results by Academy

Rank	Men's division	
Rank	Team	Points
1	Alliance	n/a
2	Gracie Barra	n/a
3	Nova União	n/a

Rank	Women's division	
Rank	Team	Points
1	Alliance	n/a
2	Gracie Barra	n/a
3	Gracie Humaita	n/a
