= 2004 World Jiu-Jitsu Championship =

Brazilian Jiu-Jitsu competitions held in 2004

- Venue: Tijuca Tênis Clube
- Location: Rio de Janeiro, Brazil

The 2004 World Jiu-Jitsu Championship was held on Sunday, July 25, 2004 at Tijuca Tênis Clube, Rio de Janeiro, Brazil.

== Teams results ==
Results by Academy

Men's division
Team
Gracie Barra
Brazilian Top Team
TT Jiu-Jitsu

Women's division
Team
UGF
Gracie Barra
Leão Dourado
