= Samuel Braga =

Brazilian martial artist

- Born: July 31, 1982 (age 44)
- Nationality: Brazilian
- Style: Brazilian Jiu Jitsu
- Fighting out of: Knoxville, TN, USA
- Team: Gracie Barra
- Rank: Black belt in Brazilian Jiu Jitsu under Vinicius "Draculino" Magalhães

Samuel Braga is a Brazilian Jiu-Jitsu black belt competitor, instructor, and academy owner. He is a ten-time world champion and a prominent member of the Gracie Barra competition team. Braga was promoted to black belt in 2005 under Vinicius "Draculino" Magalhães and is considered one of the most successful competitors to emerge from Gracie Barra Belo Horizonte.

== Early life ==
Braga was born in Belo Horizonte, Brazil. He began training in martial arts at a young age and developed a passion for Brazilian Jiu-Jitsu during his teenage years. His early instruction came under Vinicius "Draculino" Magalhães, one of the founders of Gracie Barra Belo Horizonte, who would later award him his black belt.

== Brazilian Jiu-Jitsu career ==
As a colored belt, Braga won multiple titles at the Brazilian Nationals and IBJJF World Championships, building a reputation for a highly technical guard game. After receiving his black belt in 2005, he quickly established himself on the international competition scene. Braga has won titles at the IBJJF World Championships, Pan-American Championships, and other major tournaments.

Braga is credited with helping to popularize the berimbolo technique in high-level competition, a move that became a key feature of modern Brazilian Jiu-Jitsu.

== Achievements ==
- 1st Place IBJJF World Championship (2005 / 2008 / 2010)
- 1st Place IBJJF World No-Gi Championship (2007 / 2016 Master 1)
- 2nd Place IBJJF World Championship (2007 / 2009)
- 2nd Place IBJJF Pans Championship (2008)
- 3rd Place IBJJF World Championship (2006 / 2011)

== Teaching career ==
In 2007, Braga moved to the United States and opened his own Brazilian Jiu-Jitsu academy in Knoxville, Tennessee. His academy has grown into one of the largest BJJ schools in the region, producing numerous competitors and instructors.

He also oversees several affiliate schools in Tennessee, including Bristol Jiu-Jitsu, Leviathan Jiu-Jitsu, Maryville Jiu-Jitsu, and Seymour Brazilian Jiu-Jitsu Academy. Braga is recognized for his structured teaching style and commitment to spreading Gracie Barra’s methodology abroad.

== Legacy ==
Samuel Braga is regarded as one of the most accomplished competitors to represent Gracie Barra internationally. Beyond his competitive career, he has had a lasting influence as a teacher, helping to expand the reach of Brazilian Jiu-Jitsu in the southeastern United States. His contributions to the sport include both his championship victories and his role in developing a new generation of athletes through his academies.

== See also ==
- Vítor Ribeiro
