= Dean Lister =

American mixed martial arts fighter

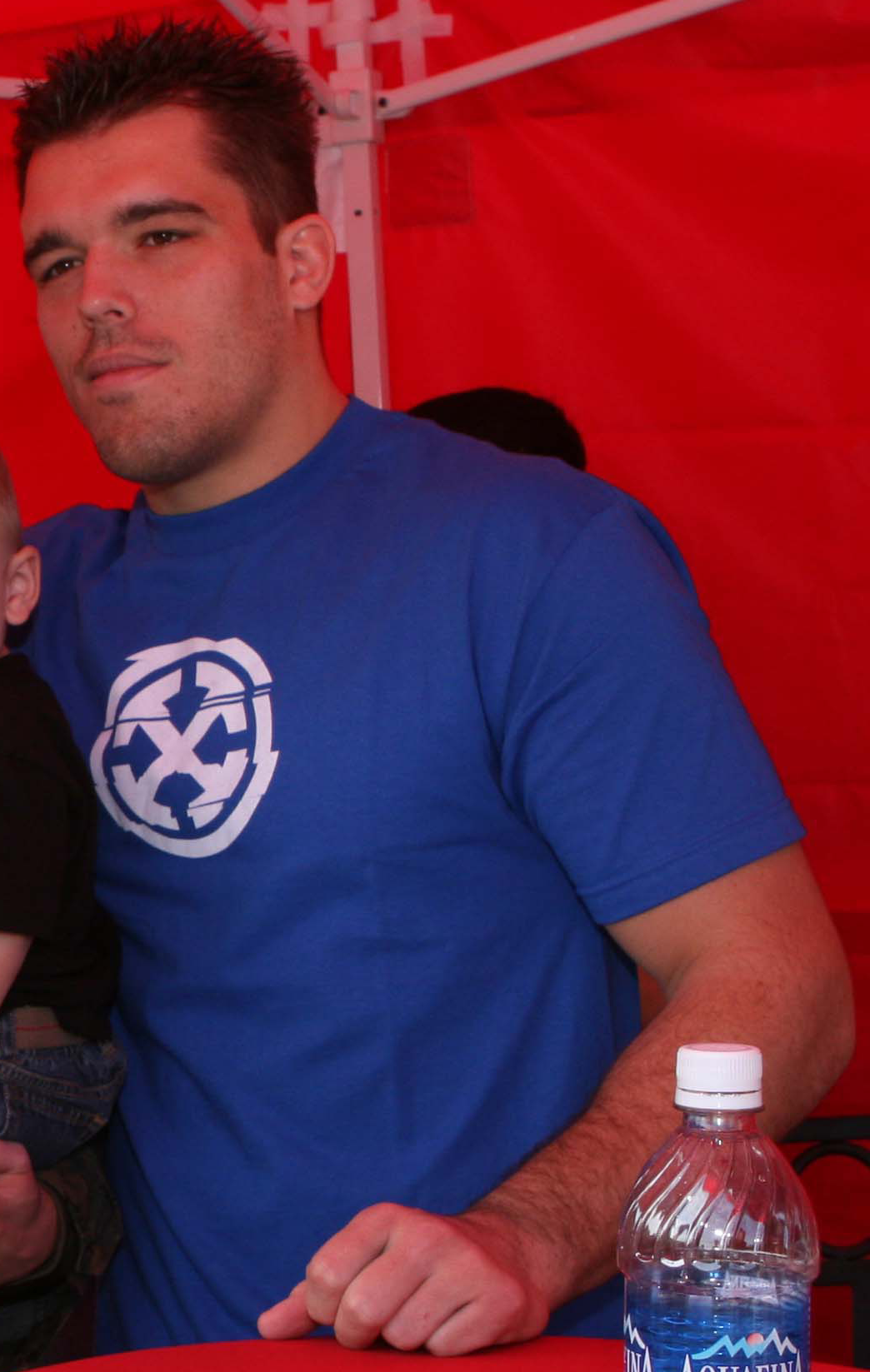
- Born: February 13, 1976 (age 50); San Diego, California, U.S.
- Other names: The Boogeyman, The Machine, Mr. Fister
- Height: 6 ft 1 in (185 cm)
- Weight: 220 lb (100 kg; 15 st 10 lb)
- Division: Middleweight; Light Heavyweight; Heavyweight
- Reach: 75 in (191 cm)
- Style: Submission wrestling, Brazilian jiu-jitsu
- Team: Fabio Santos Brazilian Jiu Jitsu (until 2003); Victory MMA (2007–present)
- Rank: 4th degree black belt in BJJ (Note: under Jeffrey Higgs); Black belt in Luta Livre
- Years active: 2000–2009; 2012, 2015

Mixed martial arts record
- Total: 20
- Wins: 13
- By submission: 11
- By decision: 2
- Losses: 7
- By decision: 7

Other information
- Mixed martial arts record from Sherdog

Dean Richard Lister (born February 13, 1976) is a retired American mixed martial artist (MMA) and submission grappler. He is a 4th degree Brazilian jiu-jitsu (BJJ) black belt, luta livre black belt, and coach. Lister is considered a pioneer of grappling and mixed martial arts.

In MMA, Lister competed in the Ultimate Fighting Championship (UFC) and PRIDE. He is a former King of the Cage Middleweight Champion. In submission grappling, Lister won two ADCC World Championship tournaments and the ADCC Superfight Championship.

== Early life ==
Lister grew up in a military family and lived in several South American countries, including Venezuela and Panama. Lister speaks several languages. He lived in Panama during the U.S. invasion in 1989, and, according to Lister, he was "right in the middle of a serious combat zone". After living in several different cities in the United States, Lister's family settled in San Diego for Lister's high school years, where he attended Hilltop High School.

== Career ==
Lister often fought as a kid, mostly due to a combination of being the "new kid", a foreigner, and being small for his age. The need to protect himself led Lister to Wrestling and Sambo.

From 1997–2003, Lister worked as an instructor for Santos. Lister teaches both beginner and advanced students at Victory MMA in San Diego. The classes typically begin with Dean teaching submission grappling techniques from various grappling arts he's accumulated during the years, followed by sparring.

He maintains that it is "the biggest and most challenging sport that exists". Lister does not favor any particular technique, although he is mostly known for his leg attacks (foot locks and knee locks).

It is worth noting that one of Lister's MMA losses is against Nathan Marquardt, despite previously submitting him in the 2003 ADCC tournament.

Lister was a King of the Cage Middleweight Champion, and defended his title several times before losing to Jeremy Horn in a Light Heavyweight fight. KOTC stripped Dean of his title after the loss, even though it was at a higher weight class. Years later, Lister avenged this loss by submitting Jeremy Horn with a guillotine choke in the TUF 7 finale.

Lister lost a three-round unanimous decision to Yushin Okami at UFC 92 on December 27, 2008, dropping his UFC record to 4–2. He subsequently requested to be released from his UFC contract, and has since signed with the Maximum Fighting Championship.

Dean Lister and Renato Sobral fought to a draw at Metamoris 3 in a submission wrestling match.

In the co-main event of Metamoris 4 on August 9, 2014, Lister faced Josh Barnett to determine the inaugural Metamoris Heavyweight Champion. Barnett became the first person in sixteen years to defeat Lister via submission, submitting Lister with a scarf hold in the final thirty seconds of the match.

=== ADCC ===
Lister competed in the first ADCC North American trial in 2002, winning the under 99 kg division. He was then invited to compete at ADCC 2003 and won the absolute division at the tournament before returning in 2005 to become the Superfight champion, defeating Jean Jacques Machado. He claimed the gold medal again in 2011 in the under 99 kg division by submitting João Assis in the final by a heel hook. He also submitted jiu-jitsu world champion Rodolfo Vieira, in his weight division, also with a heel hook. At the 2013 ADCC in Beijing, China, Lister defeated Cristiano Lazzarini in the semi-finals of the under 99 kg division by heel hook but would go on to lose on points in the finals to João Assis; In the absolute division Lister submitted both Hideki Sekine and João Gabriel Rocha by heel hook before losing to Marcus Almeida in the semi-finals. Lister also lost to Keenan Cornelius in the bronze medal match both on points.

Lister is notable for an ADCC triple crown by winning his weight division, the absolute division and a superfight. In 2022, Lister earned the honor of being part of the inaugural class of the ADCC Hall of Fame and was the first American to be included.

== Coaching career ==
Lister's sparring partner and former UFC Light Heavyweight Champion, Tito Ortiz, invited him to be his assistant grappling coach on the third season of the Spike TV reality show, The Ultimate Fighter.

Lister served as a coach alongside Roger Gracie, Jean Jacques Machado, and Rigan Machado on season 6 of the Professional Grappling Federation on April 21 to 26, 2024. Lister led Team Black Rifle Coffee Company at the tournament, and finished in third place.

Lister returned to coach on season 7 of the Professional Grappling Federation on November 3 to 8, 2024, alongside Roger Gracie, Pedro Sauer, and Carlos Machado. He led the Constellation Network team.

== Personal life ==
In April 2021, Lister was hospitalized due to being involved in a hit and run which resulted in a ruptured spleen.

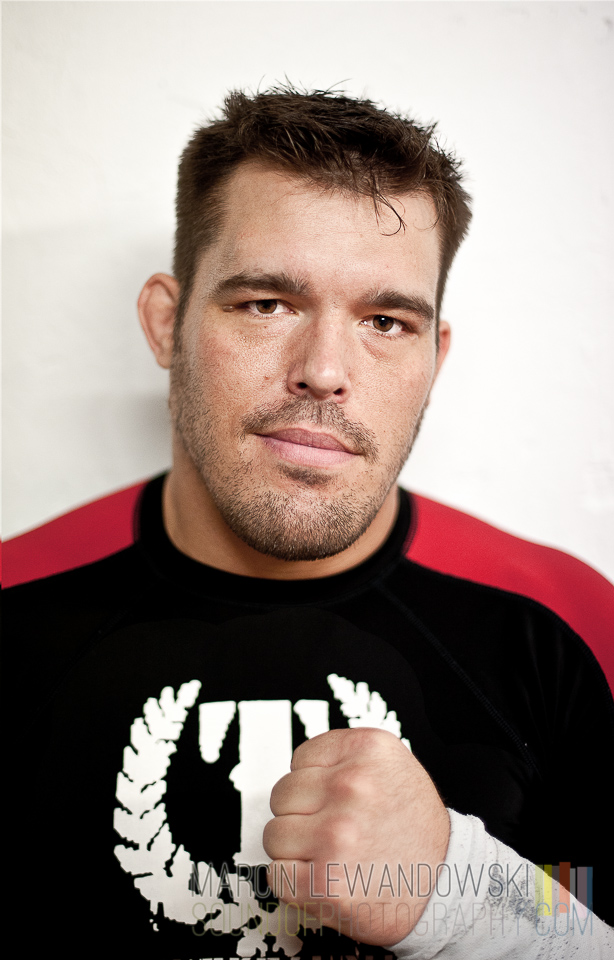
Dean Lister portrait taken during his seminar in Pedro Bessa BJJ Gym, Cork, Ireland.

== Championships and accomplishments ==
- Ultimate Fighting Championship
  - UFC.com Awards
    - 2006: Ranked #5 Submission of the Year vs. Alessio Sakara

== Mixed martial arts record ==
Professional record breakdown
20 matches	13 wins	7 losses
By submission	11	0
By decision	2	7

Res.	Record	Opponent	Method	Event	Date	Round	Time	Location	Notes
Win	13–7	Michael Knaap	Submission (heel hook)	Fightor 1	January 17, 2015	1	N/A	Charleroi, Belgium	
Win	12–7	Rodney Moore	Submission (inverted heel hook)	Cage Contender 13	March 28, 2012	3	2:44	Belfast, Northern Ireland	
Loss	11–7	Thales Leites	Decision (unanimous)	MFC 23	December 4, 2009	3	5:00	Edmonton, Alberta, Canada	
Loss	11–6	Yushin Okami	Decision (unanimous)	UFC 92	December 27, 2008	3	5:00	Las Vegas, Nevada, United States	
Win	11–5	Jeremy Horn	Submission (guillotine choke)	TUF 7 Finale	June 21, 2008	1	3:53	Las Vegas, Nevada, United States	
Win	10–5	Jordan Radev	Decision (unanimous)	UFC 79	December 29, 2007	3	5:00	Las Vegas, Nevada, United States	
Loss	9–5	Nate Marquardt	Decision (unanimous)	UFC Fight Night 8	January 25, 2007	3	5:00	Hollywood, Florida, United States	
Win	9–4	Yuki Sasaki	Decision (unanimous)	UFC Fight Night 6	August 17, 2006	3	5:00	Las Vegas, Nevada, United States	
Win	8–4	Alessio Sakara	Submission (triangle choke)	UFC 60	May 27, 2006	1	2:20	Los Angeles, California, United States	
Loss	7–4	Ricardo Arona	Decision (unanimous)	PRIDE Total Elimination 2005	April 23, 2005	3	5:00	Osaka, Japan	2005 PRIDE Middleweight Grand Prix Opening round.
Win	7–3	Akira Shoji	Submission (triangle choke)	PRIDE Bushido 6	April 3, 2005	1	3:13	Yokohama, Japan	
Loss	6–3	Amar Suloev	Decision (split)	PRIDE Bushido 4	July 19, 2004	2	5:00	Nagoya, Japan	
Loss	6–2	Jeremy Horn	Decision (majority)	KOTC 31: King of the Cage 31	December 6, 2003	4	5:00	San Jacinto, California, United States	For the KOTC Light Heavyweight Championship.
Win	6–1	James Lee	Submission (armbar)	KOTC 29: Renegades	September 5, 2003	1	N/A	San Jacinto, California, United States	Defended the KOTC Middleweight Championship.
Win	5–1	Brian Sleeman	Submission (double armbar)	KOTC 25: Flaming Fury	June 29, 2003	1	1:14	San Jacinto, California, United States	Defended the KOTC Middleweight Championship.
Win	4–1	Brendan Seguin	Submission (triangle choke)	KOTC 16: Double Cross	August 2, 2002	3	4:37	San Jacinto, California, United States	Won the vacant KOTC Middleweight Championship.
Win	3–1	Jacen Flynn	Submission (kimura)	KOTC 12: Cold Blood	February 9, 2002	2	4:28	San Jacinto, California, United States	
Win	2–1	Jerry Jenkins	Submission (heel hook)	KOTC 11: Domination	September 29, 2001	1	4:24	San Jacinto, California, United States	
Loss	1–1	Jacen Flynn	Decision (split)	KOTC 7: Wet and Wild	February 24, 2001	3	5:00	San Jacinto, California, United States	
Win	1–0	John Jensen	Submission (kneebar)	KOTC 5: Cage Wars	September 16, 2000	1	1:50	San Jacinto, California, United States	

== Grappling record ==
Professional record breakdown
39 matches	24 wins	13 losses
By submission	19	3
By decision	5	10
Draws	2	

Result	Opponent	Method	Event	Division	Year
Loss	(Russia) Muhammad Kerimov	Submission (shoulder injury during an Ezekiel choke)	ACBJJ	Superfight	2015
Loss	(Brazil) Yuri Simoes	Points (3-5)	ADCC 2015	Absolute	2015
Win	(Brazil) Ricardo Mesquita	Submission (heel hook)	ADCC 2015	Absolute	2015
Loss	(United States) Orlando Mario Sanchez	Referee Decision	ADCC 2015	+99	2015
Win	(South Korea) Hyung Chul-Lee	Submission (armlock)	ADCC 2015	+99	2015
Loss	(United States) Keenan Cornelius	Submission (reverse triangle choke)	Polaris Professional Jiu Jitsu Invitational	Superfight	2015
Loss	(United States) Josh Barnett	Submission (scarf-hold choke)	Metamoris IV	Superfight	2014
Draw	(Brazil) Renato Sobral	Draw	Metamoris III	Superfight	2014
Win	(Finland) Janne-Pekka Pietiläinen	Referee Decision	Macaco Branco Primates	Superfight	2014
Win	(Brazil) Tarsis Humphreys	Submission (heel hook)	World Jiu-Jitsu Expo	Superfight	2013
Loss	(United States) Keenan Cornelius	Points	ADCC 2013	Absolute	2013
Loss	(Brazil) Marcus Almeida	Points	ADCC 2013	Absolute	2013
Win	(Brazil) João Gabriel Rocha	Submission (heel hook)	ADCC 2013	Absolute	2013
Win	(Japan) Hideki Sekine	Submission (heel hook)	ADCC 2013	Absolute	2013
Loss	(Brazil) João Assis	Points	ADCC 2013	-99 kg	2013
Win	(Brazil) Cristiano Lazzarini	Submission (heel hook)	ADCC 2013	-99 kg	2013
Win	(United States) Ezra Lenon	Submission (heel hook)	ADCC 2013	-99 kg	2013
Win	(China) Jia Jing Jang	Submission (heel hook)	ADCC 2013	-99 kg	2013
Loss	(Brazil) João Assis	Referee Decision	Grapplers Quest: UFC Fan Expo	Absolute	2013
Win	(United States) Kyle Griffin	Submission (toe hold)	Grapplers Quest: UFC Fan Expo	Absolute	2013
Draw	(Brazil) Alexandre Ribeiro	Draw	Metamoris I	Superfight	2012
Win	(Brazil) Ricardo Abreu	Submission (heel hook)	Grapplers Quest: UFC Fan Expo	Superfight	2012
Win	(Brazil) João Assis	Submission (heel hook)	ADCC 2011	-99 kg	2011
Win	(Brazil) Rodolfo Vieira	Submission (heel hook)	ADCC 2011	-99 kg	2011
Win	(Poland) Radek Turek	Submission (heel hook)	ADCC 2011	-99 kg	2011
Win	(Brazil) Augusto Ferrari	Points	ADCC 2011	-99 kg	2011
Loss	(Brazil) Vinny Magalhães	Points	ADCC 2009	Absolute	2009
Loss	(Brazil) Glover Teixeira	Points	ADCC 2009	-99 kg	2009
Win	(Denmark) Andreas Olsen	Submission (triangle choke)	ADCC 2009	-99 kg	2009
Win	(Brazil) Jean Jacques Machado	Points	ADCC 2005	Superfight	2005
Win	(Brazil) Alexandre Ferreira	Submission (heel hook)	ADCC 2003	Absolute	2003
Win	(Brazil) Márcio Cruz	Points (3-0)	ADCC 2003	Absolute	2003
Win	(Brazil) Saulo Ribeiro	Submission (kneebar)	ADCC 2003	Absolute	2003
Win	(United States) Nate Marquardt	Submission (kimura)	ADCC 2003	Absolute	2003
Loss	(Brazil) Alexandre Ribeiro	Points	ADCC 2003	-99 kg	2003
Win	(Sweden) Ilir Latifi	Submission (guillotine choke)	ADCC 2003	-99 kg	2003
Loss	(United States) Marc Laimon	Points (2-4)	Grapplers Quest West	Absolute	2000
Win	(Peru) Tony DeSouza	Points (4-2)	Grapplers Quest West	Absolute	2000
Win	(United States) Sean Sprangler	Submission (neck crank)	Grapplers Quest West	Absolute	2000

== Instructor lineage ==
Kano Jigoro → Tomita Tsunejiro → Mitsuyo "Count Koma" Maeda → Carlos Gracie, Sr. → Helio Gracie → Rickson Gracie → Fabio Santos → Jeffrey Higgs → Dean Lister
