= 2000 World Jiu-Jitsu Championship =

Brazilian Jiu-Jitsu competitions

- Venue: Tijuca Tênis Clube
- Location: Rio de Janeiro, Brazil
- Dates: 12 July 2000
- Website: IBJJF

The 2000 World Jiu-Jitsu Championship was held at Tijuca Tênis Clube in Rio de Janeiro, Brazil, on 12 July 2000.

Among the various practitioners was Jay Dee Pen III, also known as BJ Penn. Penn, a rookie and a native of Hawaii, became on that night the first American black-belt to win a title from IBJJF Worlds.

== Teams results ==
Results by Academy

Rank	Men's division	
Rank	Team	Points
1	Gracie Barra	n/a
2	Nova União	n/a
3	Alliance	n/a

Rank	Women's division	
Rank	Team	Points
1	Alliance	n/a
2	Gracie Barra	n/a
3	Osvaldo Alves	n/a
