= Felicia Oh =

American martial artist

- Born: December 13, 1967 (age 58); Seattle, Washington
- Height: 5 ft 1 in (1.55 m)
- Weight: 115 lb (52 kg; 8.2 st)
- Style: Brazilian Jiu-Jitsu; Submission Grappling
- Teachers: Jean Jacques Machado; Eddie Bravo
- Rank: 5th degree Black Belt in Brazilian Jiu-Jitsu; Black Belt in 10th Planet Jiu-Jitsu

Other information
- University: Cornish College of the Arts; UCLA

Felicia Oh (born December 13, 1967) is an American submission grappling competitor and martial arts instructor. Oh earned her black belt in Brazilian Jiu-Jitsu under Jean Jacques Machado.

== Biography ==
Felicia was born in Seattle, Washington on December 13th, 1967. She worked as an inspector for the California State Athletic Commission for 7 years. She is currently a licensed judge for MMA, Bare-Knuckle Fighting and Boxing. Oh has taught private lessons and seminars in Submission Grappling, Brazilian Jiu-Jitsu, and Fitness. Oh was an interviewer for GrappleTV and can be heard as part of the GrappleTV Podcast.

== Combat Sports ==
Oh began training in Brazilian Jiu-Jitsu in November 2000 after being introduced to the art by her friend’s husband at the age of 33. Shortly thereafter, she enrolled at Brazilian Jiu-Jitsu master Jean Jacques Machado’s school in Tarzana, California. In June 2005, she was promoted to black belt after 4.5 years of training under Machado. Oh additionally trained under 10th planet jiu-jitsu founder Eddie Bravo.

Felicia has won many championships including winning the ADCC North American Trials, where she qualified to represent the USA at the 2007 ADCC World Submission Wrestling Championship (ADCC) and ultimately won silver in the -55kg weight class. In 2007, she was among the first to win the IBJJF Pan American Jiu-Jitsu Championship in both the black belt Gi and No-Gi divisions.

BJJHeroes listed Felicia as number 6 of the Female Dirty Dozen of Brazilian Jiu-Jitsu.

In September 2025, she was awarded her 10th Planet Black Belt by John Botello and Eddie Bravo.

== Education ==
Felicia holds a Bachelor of Fine Arts degree in Fine Art from Cornish College of the Arts in Seattle and a Master of Fine Arts degree in Fine Art/New Genres from the University of California, Los Angeles. She worked as a Broadcast Designer in Hollywood and was one of the first lecturers in the Digital Media Department at Otis College of Art and Design before concentrating on her martial arts career full-time.

== Instructor lineage ==
Kanō Jigorō → Tomita Tsunejirō → Mitsuyo "Count Koma" Maeda → Carlos Gracie Sr. → Carlos Gracie Jr. → Jean Jacques Machado → Felicia Oh

== Titles ==
- 2018 IBJJF Masters World Champion
- 2014 IBJJF Masters World Champion
- 2009 FILA World Champion, 50 kg, Gi
- 2009 FILA World Champion, 50 kg, No-Gi
- 2009 USA World Team member
- 2009 USA Grappling World Team Trials champion
- 2008 FILA Grappling Silver Medalist
- 2008 USA Grappling World Team Trials Champion
- 2008 USA World Team Member
- 2008 IBJJF World No-Gi Silver Medalist
- 2007 12th GrapplersQuest West Adv. No-Gi Absolute Champion
- 2007 FILA Grappling World Champion
- 2007 USA Grappling World Team Trials Champion
- 2007 USA Grappling Team Qualifying Trials Champion
- 2007 USA World Team Member
- 2007 ADCC Submission Wrestling World Championship Finalist
- 2007 IBJJF World No-Gi Silver Medalist
- 2007 IBJJF World Gi Bronze Medalist
- 2007 IBJJF Pan American Jiu Jitsu Black Belt Champion
- 2007 IBJJF Pan American Jiu Jitsu No-Gi Black Belt Champion
- 2006 ADCC North American Submission Wrestling Trials Champion
- 2006 US Open of Submission Grappling Absolute Champion
- 2006 US Open of Submission Grappling (Class B) Advanced Division Champion
- 2005 Pan American Games of Submission Grappling Advanced Division Champion
- 2005 Pan American Games of Submission Grappling Absolute Silver Medalist
- 2005 GrapplersQuest VII (Class A) Advanced Division Champion
- 2005 GrapplersQuest VII (Class B) Advanced Division Champion
- 2004 GrapplersQuest VI Advanced Division Champion
- 2004 GrapplersQuest VI Absolute Silver Medalist
- U.S. Open Professional Women’s Division Champion 2004
- U.S. Open 2003 – Champion
- Pan American No-Gi Championships 2003 – Champion
- Tito Ortiz Submission Wrestling Invitational 2003 – Champion
- Grappling Games 2003 No-Gi – Champion
- Copa Pacifica 2003 – Champion
- California State Championships 2002 – Champion
- Grappling Games 2001 – Champion
- 2007 Inducted into the "Masters Hall of Fame" for "Outstanding Contributions To The Martial Arts".
