= 2005 World Jiu-Jitsu Championship =

Brazilian Jiu-Jitsu competitions

The 2005 World Jiu-Jitsu Championship was held at Tijuca Tênis Clube, Rio de Janeiro, Brazil.
