= Romulo Barral =

Brazilian practitioner of Brazilian Jiu-Jitsu

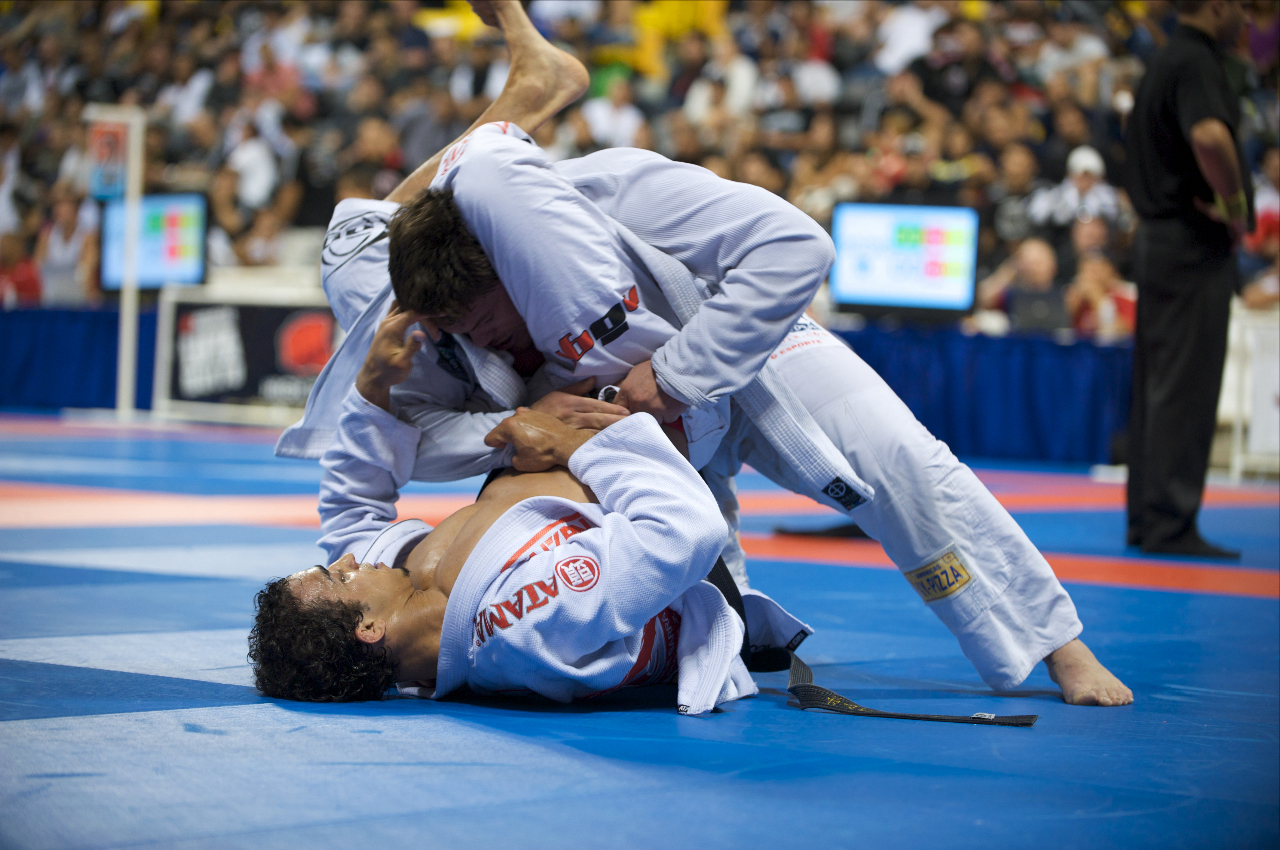
- Romulo Barral (bottom) attempting a triangle choke on Gabriel Vella (top) at the 2009 World Jiu-Jitsu Championship
- Born: 3 May 1982 (age 44); Diamantina, Minas Gerais, Brazil
- Team: Gracie Barra
- Rank: Fifth degree Black belt in Brazilian Jiu-jitsu under Vinicius Magalhães

Other information
- Mixed martial arts record from Sherdog

Romulo Barral
Medal record

Representing Brazil

Brazilian Jiu-Jitsu

World Jiu-Jitsu Championship
Gold medal – first place	2007 California, USA	-88 kg
Silver medal – second place	2007 California, USA	Absolute
Gold medal – first place	2009 California, USA	-88kg
Silver medal – second place	2009 California, USA	Absolute
Silver medal – second place	2010 California, USA	-88kg
Silver medal – second place	2010 California, USA	Absolute
Silver medal – second place	2011 California, USA	-88kg
Gold medal – first place	2012 California, USA	-88 kg
Gold medal – first place	2013 California, USA	-88 kg
Gold medal – first place	2014 California, USA	-88 kg
Silver medal – second place	2016 California, USA	-88 kg

Nogi World Jiu-Jitsu Championship
Gold medal – first place	2009 California, USA	-85 kg
Silver medal – second place	2012 California, USA	-88 kg

European Championship
Gold medal – first place	2013 Lisbon, Portugal	-88 kg

Brazilian National Championship
Gold medal – first place	2006 Rio de Janeiro, Brazil	-88 kg
Gold medal – first place	2007 Rio de Janeiro, Brazil	-88 kg
Silver medal – second place	2007 Rio de Janeiro, Brazil	Absolute

Asian Championship
Gold medal – first place	2006 Tokyo, Japan	-88 kg
Gold medal – first place	2006 Tokyo, Japan	Absolute

Romulo Barral (born 3 May 1982) is a Brazilian Jiu-Jitsu competitor and coach. He is a black belt under Vinicius "Draculino" Magalhães and competes for Gracie Barra, where he has won numerous championships. Romulo Barral is widely regarded as one of the top Brazilian Jiu-Jitsu fighters in the medium-heavyweight division. He has maintained his black belt status with consistent medals at the world’s premier BJJ tournaments. In August 2011, Barral established his own Gracie Barra academy in Northridge, California establishing himself as a prominent coach. He is a 5-time IBJJF World Champion in the black belt division (2006, 2007, 2009, 2012, 2014), a 3-time silver medalist in the open weight division, a World No-Gi Champion (2007), and the 2013 ADCC Submission Wrestling World Champion.

== Early life ==
Romulo Barral was born in Diamantina, Minas Gerais, Brazil, and began training Brazilian Jiu-Jitsu in his teens under Vinicius "Draculino" Magalhães in Belo Horizonte. His early exposure to BJJ came through the Gracie Barra network, where he developed a technical and aggressive style, particularly known for his proficiency in the spider guard and triangle submissions. Barral progressed rapidly through the belt ranks, earning his black belt in 2004 from Draculino, and quickly established himself as a formidable competitor in the meio pesado division.

== Competitive career ==
Barral’s competitive career is marked by his dominance in the IBJJF World Championships, where he secured black belt titles in the medium-heavyweight division in 2006, 2007, 2009, 2012, and 2014. His 2007 campaign was particularly notable, as he also won the World No-Gi Championship in the same year, showcasing his versatility in both gi and no-gi formats. In the open weight (absolute) division, Barral earned silver medals at the IBJJF Worlds in 2007, 2009, and 2012, often facing larger opponents with his technical prowess. His crowning achievement came in 2013, when he won the ADCC Submission Wrestling World Championship in the 88 kg division, defeating notable grapplers with his signature guard game.

Barral is also recognized for his consistency in other major tournaments, including multiple medals at the IBJJF Pan-American Championships and Brazilian Nationals (CBJJ). His competitive style, characterized by a strong spider guard and submission-oriented approach, has made him a standout figure in BJJ.

== Coaching career ==
Barral has taught seminars around the world. In August 2011, Barral opened Gracie Barra Northridge in California, where he has trained a new generation of BJJ practitioners. His academy has become a hub for competitive athletes, producing several IBJJF and regional champions. Barral’s coaching philosophy emphasizes technical precision and mental resilience, drawing from his own competitive experience. He has mentored notable fighters, including students who have medaled at the IBJJF World Championships and other major tournaments. His move to the United States also allowed him to expand Gracie Barra’s presence internationally, contributing to the organization’s global reputation.

== Mixed martial arts record ==
Professional record breakdown
2 matches	2 wins	0 losses
By knockout	0	0
By submission	2	0
By decision	0	0

Res.	Record	Opponent	Method	Event	Date	Round	Time	Location	Notes
Win	2–0	Adrian Valdez	Technical Submission (rear-naked choke)	Rage In The Cage 122	February 28, 2009	2	1:20	Phoenix, AZ, United States	
Win	1–0	Fabiano Fabiano	Technical Submission (rear-naked choke)	Arena	October 9, 2004	1	n/a	Belo Horizonte, Brazil	
