= São Pedro dos Ferros =

Brazilian municipality located in the state of Minas Gerais

Coordinates: 20°10′S 42°31′W

- Municipality
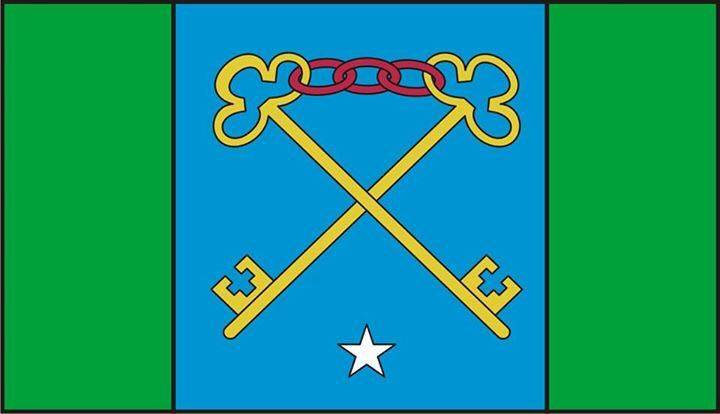
- Flag
- Interactive map of São Pedro dos Ferros
- Country: Brazil
- State: Minas Gerais
- Region: Southeast
- Time zone: UTC−3 (BRT)

Location of São Pedro dos Ferros within Minas Gerais

São Pedro dos Ferros is a Brazilian municipality located in the state of Minas Gerais. The city belongs to the mesoregion of Zona da Mata and to the microregion of Ponte Nova. As of 2020, the estimated population was 7,706.

== See also ==
- List of municipalities in Minas Gerais
