= Rigan Machado =

Brazilian martial artist

- Born: 2 July 1966 (age 60); Rio de Janeiro, Brazil
- Style: Brazilian Jiu Jitsu, Sambo
- Teachers: Helio Gracie, Rolls Gracie, Carlos Gracie Jr.
- Rank: 9th deg. BJJ Red belt

Other information
- Notable relatives: Machado family Gracie Family
- Notable students: Dan Inosanto, Erik Paulson, Chuck Norris, John Will, Chris Haueter, Rick Minter, Cindy Omatsu, Damone Revere, Rodney King
- Website: www.theacademybeverlyhills.com/instructors/rigan-machado/

Rigan Machado (born 2 July 1966) is a Brazilian-American martial arts instructor. He is a 9th degree red belt in Brazilian jiu-jitsu, earning his rank under Rorion Gracie. He is a former Pan American Champion (1996, 1997 weight and absolute) and a veteran medalist of the ADCC. Machado currently teaches out of his Beverly Hills, California, academy and is instructor to several Los Angeles–based celebrity students.

== Biography ==
Machado was born in Rio de Janeiro, and is one of five brothers in the Machado family. He began training at the age of five with his cousins, "The Gracie Family". In an interview, when asked about his exact relationship with the Gracies, he said: "My mother's sister married the founder of Brazilian Jiu-Jitsu, Carlos Gracie."

Machado was awarded the first black belt under Gracie Barra founder Carlos Gracie Jr. and is one of the original teachers who taught in the garage of Rorion Gracie in the early days of Brazilian Jiu Jitsu in America. He also trained with his other cousins such Rickson Gracie, Rorion Gracie, Rillion Gracie, his uncle Carlos Gracie Sr, and his brothers. At one point in 1986, he even publicly competed against Rickson Gracie at a Jiu-Jitsu competition in one of the earliest public matches between members of the family.

He is widely regarded as one of the top competitors in Brazilian Jiu-Jitsu history. He also competed and won many tournaments in judo, sambo, and wrestling. In Sambo he was placed second at the 198 lbs division, and third at the open class of the 1993 Pan American Sambo Championships in Chula Vista; and at some point between 1990 and 1994, he was seen submitting several Judo black belts in at least one Judo competition at the West Covina Dojo.

== Instructor lineage ==
Kanō Jigorō → Tomita Tsunejirō → Mitsuyo "Count Koma" Maeda → Carlos Gracie → Hélio Gracie → Rolls Gracie & Carlos "Carlinhos" Gracie Jr → Rigan Machado

== As an instructor ==
Machado currently teaches at his school, "The Academy Beverly Hills", located in Beverly Hills, California. He is also the commissioner of Jiu Jitsu World League. Due to the location of his gym, many students of his gym are celebrities such as Ashton Kutcher, Vin Diesel, Wiz Khalifa, Wagner Moura, Bryan Callen, and Charlie Hunnam.

Machado served as a coach alongside Roger Gracie, Jean Jacques Machado, and Dean Lister on season 6 of the Professional Grappling Federation on April 21 to 26, 2024. Machado led Team 1st Phorm at the tournament, and finished in second place. On April 10, 2026 Rigan was promoted to 9th degree (Red Belt) by Rorion Gracie.

== See also ==
- List of Brazilian Jiu-Jitsu practitioners
