= Jean Jacques Machado =

Brazilian martial artist

Jean-Jacques Machado
- Born: February 12, 1968 (age 58); Rio de Janeiro, Brazil
- Style: Brazilian Jiu-Jitsu
- Teachers: Carlos Gracie Jr., Rickson Gracie, Rolls Gracie
- Rank: 8th degree red and black Coral belt in Brazilian Jiu-Jitsu

Other information
- Notable students: Eddie Bravo, Dan Inosanto, Joe Rogan, Richard Norton, Chris D'Elia, Chuck Norris, Todd White, Mark Mireles, Marcel Santos
- Website: www.jeanjacquesmachado.com

Jean Jacques Machado (born February 12, 1968) is a Brazilian Jiu jitsu practitioner. He is one of the five Machado brothers (Carlos, Roger, Rigan and John). Machado is nephew of BJJ co-founder and Grandmaster Carlos Gracie, and learned the martial art from an early age.

Machado is known for his grappling skills having won ADCC Submission Wrestling World Championships in his weight division plus a runner up in the open division in 2001. As a result of his achievements in the sport, he was inducted to the ADCC Hall of Fame as part of the 2024 class.

== Biography ==
Machado was born in Rio de Janeiro, Brazil and suffered birth defects resulting from amniotic band syndrome, which left him with only the thumb and the little finger on his left hand. Despite this congenital problem, which directly affects the skill of gripping, he began his Jiu-Jitsu training over thirty years ago and dominated the competitive arena of Brazilian Jiu-Jitsu in his native country, capturing every major title and competition award from 1982 through 1992.

In 1992, Machado arrived in the United States where he continued competing successfully.

On June 6, 2011, in a private ceremony held at the Rickson Gracie Academy in West Los Angeles, Machado was promoted to a 7th degree red-and-black belt. This prestigious promotion is in recognition of Machado's 25 years as a black belt instructor, competitor and champion. He then received the 8th degree on his black belt from Rickson Gracie on March 29, 2025.

== Coaching career ==
Since retiring from competition, Machado has focused his time on coaching students instead. He famously taught both 10th Planet Jiu Jitsu founder Eddie Bravo and podcaster Joe Rogan, along with a number of other celebrities and prominent martial arts figures like Freddie Prinze Jr. and Dan Inosanto.

Machado served as a coach alongside Roger Gracie, Rigan Machado, and Dean Lister on season 6 of the Professional Grappling Federation on April 21 to 26, 2024. Machado led Team X-Martial at the tournament, and they won the team title.

== Professional titles ==
- Rio de Janeiro Jiu-Jitsu State Championships

Cruiserweight Champion: 11 consecutive years (1982–1992)

- Brazilian Jiu-Jitsu National Championships

Cruiserweight Champion: 11 consecutive years (1982–1992)

- Sambo Wrestling Championships

National and Pan American Cruiserweight Champion
1993 Oklahoma - 1st Place
1994 San Diego, California - 1st Place

- Grappling Style Challenge Japan

1995 - Champion

- Brazilian Jiu-Jitsu American Championships

4 consecutive years (1995–1998)

- Black Belt Super Challenge Championships

1998 - Champion
2000 - Champion

- Abu Dhabi Submission Wrestling World Championships

1999 - 66–76 kg Division Gold Medalist, Most Technical Fighter Award
2000 - 66–76 kg Division Silver Medalist
2001 - Absolute Division Silver Medalist, Best Match Award, Fastest Submission Award
2005 - Superfight Runner Up

== Instructor lineage ==
Jigorō Kanō → Tomita Tsunejirō → Mitsuyo Maeda → Carlos Gracie Sr. → Hélio Gracie → Rickson Gracie → Jean Jacques Machado

== Mixed martial arts record ==
Professional record breakdown
1 match	0 wins	1 loss
By knockout	0	1
By submission	0	0
By decision	0	0

Result	Record	Opponent	Method	Event	Date	Round	Time	Location	Notes
Loss	0-1	(United States) Frank Trigg	TKO (corner stoppage)	VTJ 1998 - Vale Tudo Japan 1998	October 25, 1998	3	0:20	Urayasu, Chiba, Japan	

== Submission grappling record ==
16 Matches, 12 Wins (10 Submissions), 4 Losses
Result	Rec.	Opponent	Method	Event	Division	Date	Location
Loss	12-4	(United States) Dean Lister	Points	ADCC 2005	Superfight	May 29, 2005	(United States) Los Angeles, CA
Loss	12-3	(Brazil) Ricardo Arona	Points	ADCC 2001	Absolute	April 13, 2001	(United Arab Emirates) Abu Dhabi
Win	12-2	(Brazil) Ricardo Almeida	Points	ADCC 2001	Absolute	April 13, 2001	(United Arab Emirates) Abu Dhabi
Win	11-2	(Brazil) Márcio Cruz	Submission (kneebar)	ADCC 2001	Absolute	April 13, 2001	(United Arab Emirates) Abu Dhabi
Win	10-2	(Japan) Tsuyoshi Kohsaka	Submission (armbar)	ADCC 2001	Absolute	April 13, 2001	(United Arab Emirates) Abu Dhabi
Loss	9-2	(United States) Matt Serra	Penalty	ADCC 2001	–77 kg	April 11, 2001	(United Arab Emirates) Abu Dhabi
Win	9-1	(Russia) Serguei Onishuk	Submission (rear naked choke)	ADCC 2001	–77 kg	April 11, 2001	(United Arab Emirates) Abu Dhabi
Loss	8-1	(Brazil) Renzo Gracie	Advantage	ADCC 2000	–77 kg	March 2, 2000	(United Arab Emirates) Abu Dhabi
Win	8-0	(Brazil) Leo Vieira	Points	ADCC 2000	–77 kg	March 2, 2000	(United Arab Emirates) Abu Dhabi
Win	7-0	(United States) Mikey Burnett	Submission (ezekiel choke)	ADCC 2000	–77 kg	March 1, 2000	(United Arab Emirates) Abu Dhabi
Win	6-0	(Brazil) Marcio Barbosa	Submission (rear naked choke)	ADCC 2000	–77 kg	March 1, 2000	(United Arab Emirates) Abu Dhabi
Win	5-0	(Japan) Caol Uno	Submission (rear naked choke)	ADCC 1999	–77 kg	February 25, 1999	(United Arab Emirates) Abu Dhabi
Win	4-0	(Japan) Hayato Sakurai	Submission (rear naked choke)	ADCC 1999	–77 kg	February 25, 1999	(United Arab Emirates) Abu Dhabi
Win	3-0	(United States) Micah Pittman	Submission (rear naked choke)	ADCC 1999	–77 kg	February 24, 1999	(United Arab Emirates) Abu Dhabi
Win	2-0	(United States) Ryan Harvey	Submission (rear naked choke)	ADCC 1999	–77 kg	February 24, 1999	(United Arab Emirates) Abu Dhabi
Win	1-0	(Japan) Yuki Nakai	Submission (triangle choke)	Shooto: Vale Tudo Perception	Superfight	September 26, 1995	(Japan) Tokyo

== See also ==
- List of Brazilian Jiu-Jitsu practitioners
