= Gracie Barra =

Brazilian jiu-jitsu academy and competition team

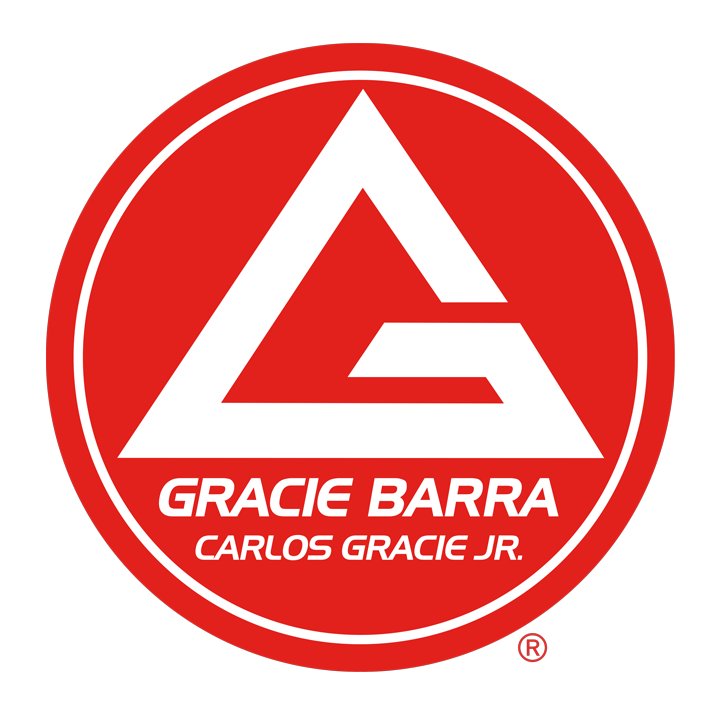
- Also known as: GB
- Date founded: 1986
- Country of origin: Brazil
- Founder: Carlos Gracie Jr
- Arts taught: Brazilian jiu-jitsu
- Ancestor schools: Academia Gracie
- Practitioners: Vinicius Magalhaes; Romulo Barral; Samuel Braga; Paulo Castro; Braulio Estima; Marcio Feitosa; Roger Gracie; Kyra Gracie; Felipe Pena; Nino Schembri; Otávio Souza
- Official website: graciebarra.com

Gracie Barra (GB) is a Brazilian jiu-jitsu academy and team founded in 1986 by Carlos Gracie Jr.

== History ==
Gracie Barra was founded in 1986 by Carlos Gracie Jr. in the Barra da Tijuca neighborhood in Rio de Janeiro. The name 'Gracie Barra' is derived from the Barra da Tijuca neighborhood of Rio de Janeiro, where the academy was established. Carlos Gracie Jr. is the son of Carlos Gracie Sr., one of the founders of Brazilian jiu-jitsu. He had been head coach at the main Gracie academy in Centro, Rio de Janeiro, before leading his brother Rolls Gracie's school in Copacabana, following the death of Rolls Gracie in a hang-gliding accident.

Competitors representing Gracie Barra have achieved podium finishes at the World IBJJF Jiu-Jitsu World Championship, including multiple medals in the black belt divisions. In 2002, members of the team won eight gold medals in the men's black belt division.

In 2005, the team's headquarters was moved to Lake Forest, California, United States. In 2010, Gracie Barra created an instructors' certification program. According to the organization, Gracie Barra has produced hundreds of black belts worldwide.

== Philosophy and teaching method ==
Gracie Barra's teaching philosophy centers on structured progression through Brazilian jiu-jitsu techniques, from beginner to black belt level.

The teaching methodology at Gracie Barra is structured around a series of programs designed to facilitate students' progression from white belt to black belt. These programs are:

- GB¹ Program – Jiu-Jitsu Fundamentals: Introduces beginners to the basic principles and self-defense strategies of BJJ.
- GB² Program – Advanced Jiu-Jitsu: Builds upon fundamental techniques, introducing more advanced concepts and movements.
- GB³ Program – Expert Jiu-Jitsu: Exposes students to various training dynamics, including Mixed Martial Arts (MMA), No-Gi, and high-level Gi techniques.

Each program follows a 16-week curriculum.

Carlos Gracie Jr.'s approach was influenced by three key figures: his father, Carlos Gracie Sr., who described jiu-jitsu as a tool for improving lives; his uncle, Hélio Gracie, who emphasized discipline; and his brother, Rolls Gracie, who advocated for incorporating techniques from other martial arts.

== Notable champions ==
Gracie Barra has produced several Brazilian jiu-jitsu practitioners who have competed at international level. Notable competitors include:

- Roger Gracie: A ten-time IBJJF World Champion at black belt, member of the IBJJF Hall of Fame who also competed in mixed martial arts.
- Rômulo Barral: A black belt under Vinicius Magalhães, he is a five-time IBJJF World Champion and the 2013 ADCC Champion. In 2011, he established a Gracie Barra academy in Northridge, California.
- Kyra Gracie: A five-time IBJJF World Champion and three-time ADCC Champion. She has also worked as a commentator for BJJ and MMA events.
- Orlando Sanchez: Won the ADCC Championship in the heavyweight division. He died in 2022 at the age of 40.
- Braulio Estima: A four-time IBJJF World Champion at black belt (2004, 2006, 2009, 2014), member of the IBJJF Hall of Fame and the 2009 ADCC Absolute Champion. He established a Gracie Barra academy in Birmingham.

== CompNet and other initiatives ==
Gracie Barra organizes a student tournament circuit known as the Gracie Barra Competition Network (CompNet) and runs programs for youth and instructor development, including the Future Champions Program 3.0.

== Media coverage and cultural influence ==
- Women's camps: Gracie Barra organized women's camps in Brazil and the United States in 2024, with over 500 participants reported across both events. The event in Florianópolis, Santa Catarina gathered more than 300 women.
- Social projects: Gracie Barra's social initiatives, such as programs aimed at training young athletes in Curitiba, have been covered in sports media.
- Competition achievements: Gracie Barra Laranjeiras do Sul secured second place in the 1st Open Laranjeiras de Jiu-Jitsu, an event that drew around 400 athletes from 19 cities.

== See also ==
- List of professional MMA training camps
- Gracie family
- Gracie Diet
- Gracie Barra Sydney
