= Rolls Gracie =

Brazilian mixed martial artist (1951–1982)

- Born: March 28, 1951; Rio de Janeiro, Brazil
- Died: June 6, 1982 (aged 31); Resende, Rio de Janeiro, Brazil; Hang gliding accident
- Teachers: Helio Gracie, Georges Mehdi, Bob Anderson
- Rank: 9th deg. BJJ red belt

Other information
- Notable students: Rickson Gracie, Carlos Gracie Jr., Royler Gracie, Rigan Machado, Márcio Stambowsky, Mauricio Motta Gomes, Romero Cavalcanti

Rolls Gracie (Brazilian Portuguese: [ʁowz ˈɡɾejsi]; March 28, 1951 – June 6, 1982) was a Brazilian martial artist. He was a prominent member of the Gracie family known for their founding of Brazilian jiu-jitsu and considered by some the family's best ever fighter. He was teacher of Rickson Gracie, Carlos Gracie Jr., Royler Gracie, Maurício "Maurição" Motta Gomes, Márcio "Macarrão" Stambowsky, Rigan Machado and Romero "Jacare" Cavalcanti. He died in a hang-gliding accident in 1982. He is the father of Rolles Gracie and Igor Gracie.

== The Famous Five ==
The Famous Five was a nickname for the original five black belt students of Rolls Gracie, who were well known for their fighting skills. Just prior to his untimely death, Rolls promoted a sixth black belt into the group. The established terminology persisted so that the following six men continued to be called "The Famous Five."

- Márcio Stambowsky
- Mauricio Gomes
- Romero Cavalcanti
- Nicin Azulay
- Paulo Conde
- Mario Claudio Tallarico
