= Carlos Gracie Jr. =

Brazilian Jiu-Jitsu practitioner from Brazil (born 1956)

- Born: January 17, 1956 (age 70)
- Other names: Carlinhos
- Style: Brazilian jiu-jitsu
- Teachers: Carlos Gracie and Rolls Gracie
- Rank: 9th deg. BJJ red belt

Carlos "Carlinhos" Gracie Jr. is a Brazilian 9th-degree red belt Brazilian jiu-jitsu (BJJ) practitioner and coach. (Note: promoted on 25 April 2026) A member of the Gracie family, he is the son of Carlos Gracie, one of the founders of Brazilian jiu-jitsu.

== Career ==
Gracie is the founder of the Confederação Brasileira de Jiu-Jitsu (CBJJ), also known as International Brazilian Jiu-Jitsu Federation (IBJJF), a for-profit company which organizes BJJ and submission grappling tournaments, including the World Jiu-Jitsu Championship, Pan Jiu-Jitsu Championship and European Jiu-Jitsu Championship. He is a co-founder of the Gracie Barra team.

== Personal life ==
Carlinhos is one of twenty-one children fathered by Brazilian jiu-jitsu co-founder Carlos Gracie. He has three children: daughter Caroline, and sons Kayron and Kyan. Kayron is a black belt under his father and is a professor at Gracie Barra Rancho Santa Margarita. Gracie is also the founder and director of Gracie Magazine, a monthly Brazilian jiu-jitsu publication.

== Instructor lineage ==
Kanō Jigorō → Mitsuyo Maeda → Carlos Gracie Sr. → Carlos Gracie Jr.

== See also ==
- List of Brazilian jiu-jitsu practitioners
