= Ivan Gomes =

Brazilian mixed martial artist

- Born: Ivan Simão da Cunha; December 25, 1939; Campina Grande, Brazil
- Died: March 2, 1990 (aged 50); Campina Grande, Brazil; Kidney failure
- Other names: "El Samurai" ("The Samurai")
- Height: 5 ft 11 in (1.80 m)
- Weight: 246 lb (112 kg; 17 st 8 lb)
- Style: Boxing, Brazilian Jiu-Jitsu, Judo
- Years active: 1954–1977

Ivan Simão da Cunha Gomes (December 25, 1939 - March 2, 1990) was a Brazilian vale tudo fighter and professional wrestler.

== Early life ==
Born in Fazenda das Lajes in Campina Grande, Gomes was expected to become a cowboy like his father, but he started a career in martial arts after meeting coach Tatá. Along with his brothers José and Jaildo, Ivan trained in boxing and a few notions of "jiu-jitsu" (a name for judo in Brazil at the time). He trained formally in the latter art under Agatangelo Braga and his brother-in-law Osmar "Builson" Mouzinho de Oliveira, trainees of judoka Takeo Yano, and also learned under grappler José María Freire, a Brazilian jiu-jitsu expert from the George Gracie lineage. Gomes, who was a black belt under Braga at 21, also polished further his orthodox judo skills with Hayashi Kawamura in Recife and Masayoshi "Massaioshi" Saito in Belém do Pará. He started his vale tudo career shortly after.

== Vale tudo career ==
Gomes gained popularity in the late 1950s, signing up with a televised show named Ringues Torres that covered the northeast of Brazil, and later moving to another show named Bolsa ao Vencedor. Gomes dominated the competition through the years, eventually leading to a high-profile match against Carlson Gracie from the notorious Gracie family in 1963. They fought on December 28 in Recife, in a fight in which Gomes supposedly had an advantage of almost 50 pounds. Gomes dominated Gracie, throwing him and taking him down multiple times and hitting ground and pound, while Carlson waited for him to get tired to build an offense. The match ended in a draw, although witnesses and specialized press were unanimous Gomes was the better man.

After the fight, Carlson complained about the rules, driving Gomes to propose a rematch. The Gracie family promised to concede it if Gomes managed to defeat Juarez Ferreira in Rio de Janeiro, but although Gomes did so, knocking Ferreira out with kata guruma in less of a minute, the rematch was never granted. Instead, the Gracies offered Gomes to open an academy together with Carlson, with the condition Gomes would never challenge them again. In November 1965, due to the presence of Anton Geesink and several famous judoka in Brazil, the Gracies challenged them, claiming the superiority of Brazilian jiu-jitsu over judo and offering Gomes and Carlson to fight to prove it, but they were ignored.

However, the partnership with the Gracies dissolved shortly after. His brother José described the situation as:

"[Ivan] didn't learn anything there. Reality is, he taught them a whole lot. People often ask me if we learned from the Gracies. I always say, everything we know came from the Japanese. Geo Omori, Takeo Yano, the Ono brothers, etc. Carlos and Hélio didn't invent a thing. The best Gracie out there was George Gracie, by a landslide. He left the Gracies to train mainly under Yano, and the Ono brothers. He was the true family champion."

In 1968, after handing the academy to his brother Jaildo, Gomes returned to Campina Grande and resumed his vale tudo career, meeting fighters like Waldemar Santana and Euclides Pereira. In 1974, he opened another school there to teach his style of BJJ.

== Professional wrestling career ==
In December 1974, when Japanese professional wrestling promotion New Japan Pro-Wrestling toured Brazil, Gomes publicly challenged its owner Antonio Inoki to a vale tudo fight. Inoki instead proposed Gomes to become a NJPW wrestler, and after the Brazilian became interested in the style of catch wrestling used by the Japanese troupe, he accepted the offer. Gomes traveled to Japan with them, training in wrestling under Inoki himself while teaching him and his wrestlers his own style in return. Gomes wrestled many opener matches against Yoshiaki Fujiwara, Don Arakawa and Daigoro Oshiho, always coming out on top.

=== Match with Willem Ruska ===
In 1976, during a NJPW tour through Brazil, Gomes was slated to wrestle judo medalist Willem Ruska on August 7 at the Maracanã Stadium in Rio de Janeiro. Previous negotiations about the match's results and length were troublesome, and as a result, there was tension between the parts.

During the bout, refereed by Mr. Takahashi, Gomes attacked Ruska with real strikes and illegal closed-fisted punches, which Ruska answered by landing a similar right punch, and the match became a shoot right after. The slightly heavier Brazilian dragged Ruska to the ground with a guillotine choke, but Ruska escaped and mounted him. After becoming entangled with the ring ropes, a bloody Gomes captured Ruska's back and tried a rear naked choke, to which Ruska grabbed the ropes to break action as per the match's rules. However, the Brazilian refused to release Ruska, so the referee, upon observing most of Gomes' body was outside the ropes, called for countout on him in order to end the match at 9:03. There was controversy about whether the choke and the rope escape were effective or not.

The event's crowds believed Gomes had been wronged with the decision, and a riot almost broke out until NJPW president Antonio Inoki came out and calmed them down. Still, repercussion in Brazil was negative, with pundits arguing about who should be considered the victor, even although some acknowledged Gomes had started the affair with an illegal move. As a consequence, the Athletic Commission of Rio de Janeiro banned Takahashi and Ruska from all sport competitions. The Japanese considered Ruska the winner, as Gomes had to receive nine stitches around the right eye for damage suffered in the brawl, while Ruska was comparatively in much better condition. It was also reported Inoki secretly gifted Ruska a money bonus to compensate his ban from competing.

Gomes was left with two more matches in the tour, against Strong Kobayashi and Osamu Kido respectively, and he won them both. It was his last work for NJPW.

== Legacy and death ==
Ivan Gomes is known for being the innovator of the heel hook submission. After his return to Brazil from his professional wrestling stint, Gomes retired and became solely a teacher. He passed in March 1990 due to renal illness.
