= Sleeper hold =

Sleeper hold may refer to:

- A type of chokehold
- A pre-MMA term for a version of the rear naked choke used in professional wrestling matches
- A travel pillow invented by Brazilian Jiu-Jitsu instructor Rener Gracie
