= Euclides Pereira =

Vale tudo fighter

- Born: 7 May 1941 (age 85); Currais Novos, Rio Grande do Norte, Brazil
- Other names: "O Diabo Louro" ("The Blond Devil")
- Height: 5 ft 9 in (1.75 m)
- Weight: 171 lb (78 kg; 12 st 3 lb)
- Style: Boxing; Brazilian Jiu-Jitsu; Capoeira; Karate; Luta Livre
- Rank: 9th deg. BJJ red belt
- Years active: 1958 – 1977

Mixed martial arts record
- Total: 13
- Wins: 8
- By knockout: 2
- By submission: 2
- By decision: 4
- Losses: 0
- Draws: 4
- No contests: 1

Euclides Pereira (born 7 May 1941) is a former Vale Tudo fighter and current Brazilian jiu-jitsu coach.

== Biography ==
Pereira was born in northeastern Brazil. His family moved to the city of Natal when he was a child, and he attended Salesian College to become a priest. He ended leaving the college for working in a hotel, and he would start training in martial arts, soon become a student under José Jurandir Moura, who was also a judo and Brazilian jiu-jitsu certified teacher under George Gracie and Takeo Yano. He also trained in karate, capoeira and boxing, and had his debut in the Vale Tudo circuit at 17.

He joined the luta livre camp and became a legend in the vale tudo fights, getting the nickname of "O Diabo Louro" ("The Blond Devil") for his aggressiveness and charisma. He was the star of the Brazilian TV show Heroes do Ringue, fighting weekly from 1960-1966 on TV. Lore had his record as 358-0, even although Euclides was known not to hand pick his opponents in order to pad his record. He fought fellow Vale Tudo legends like Ivan Gomes and Valdemar Santana. He also was made famous when he defeated Carlson Gracie via a decision in 1968.

The fight which took 5 years to be planned, until all the conditions imposed by the Gracies were finally accepted. Knowing Carlson's danger on the mat, Euclides took advantage of his own superiority in striking and wrestling and almost got Gracie knocked out at the fourth round, breaking his nose and damaging his eye region. After 50 minutes, Pereira won the decision over a heavily bloodied Carlson. The match had controversy when Carlson claimed he had been "robbed" by the judges, given that Euclides had exited the ring to avoid a guillotine choke, however a common tactic at the time. Carlson was granted a rematch, but he never took it. Euclides would fight for 25 years before retiring.

== Career highlights ==
- 1958: Won over Waldo Santana by submission (strikes) in Recife
- 1963: Won over King Kong by KO (strikes)
- 1963: Drew with Waldemar Santana
- 1964: Drew with Ivan Gomes in Recife
- 1967: Won over Waldemar Santana by decision
- 1967: Won over Waldemar Santana by decision
- 1967: Drew with Ivan Gomes in Campina Grande
- 1967: Drew with Ivan Gomes in Petrolina - The match was called out by officials when sun set over the open air ring and it was considered insufficient light.
- 1968: Won over Waldemar Santana by retirement - Santana refused to return to the ring.
- 1968: Won over Carlson Gracie by decision
- 1972: Drew with Ivan Gomes in Manaus
- 1974: Won over Waldemar Santana by decision
- 1974: Drew with Ivan Gomes in Brasilia
- 1979: Won over Rei Zulu by submission (guillotine choke)
