= Rorion Gracie =

Brazilian martial artist (born 1952)

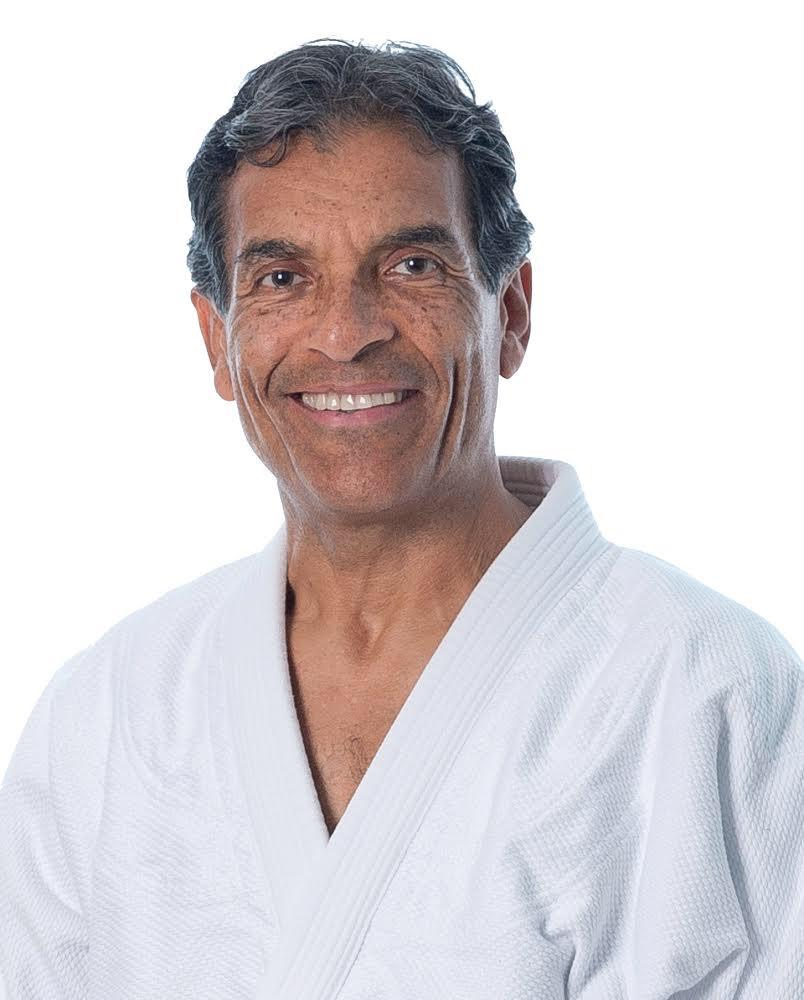
- Gracie in 2022
- Born: January 10, 1952 (age 74); Rio de Janeiro, Brazil
- Style: Gracie Jiu-Jitsu
- Teacher: Hélio Gracie
- Rank: 9th deg. BJJ red belt

Other information
- Spouse: Silvia Gracie; Suzanne Gracie
- Notable students: Rener Gracie, Ralek Gracie, Chuck Norris, John McCarthy, Ed O'Neill, Michael Clarke Duncan, Eve Torres, Javier Vazquez, Tito Ortiz
- Website: roriongracie.com

Rorion Gracie (Portuguese: [ˈʁɔɾjõ ˈɡɾejsi]; born January 10, 1952) is a Brazilian-born Gracie jiu-jitsu Grand Master, a prominent member of the Gracie family, writer, publisher, producer, lecturer, lawyer and the co-founder of the Ultimate Fighting Championship. He is the oldest son of Hélio Gracie and one of the few people in the world to hold a 9th degree red belt in Brazilian Jiu-Jitsu, and is widely recognized as one of the men responsible for introducing Gracie/Brazilian Jiu-Jitsu to the United States and the world. He was inducted into the Martial Arts History Museum Hall of Fame in 2009.

== Early life and education ==
Rorion started jiu-jitsu at a young age, doing demonstrations and classes. He spent his youth learning how to teach under the tutelage of his father, Grand Master Hélio Gracie. In December 1969, he travelled to the United States for a vacation returning to Brazil in the end of 1970. He attended the Federal University of Rio de Janeiro, graduating with a degree in Law.

== Career ==
In 1978, Rorion Gracie moved to Southern California where he worked as an extra in movies and television. Attempting to spread Jiu-Jitsu culture, he laid some mats in his garage in Hermosa Beach and invited people he met to try the sport. In 1985, Rorion invited his 18-year-old brother, Royce, to move to America.

In America, Rorion and his brothers continued the tradition of Gracie Challenge, where they would invite fighters from different martial arts in order to challenge them in a no-rules Vale Tudo match in order to promote Gracie Jiu-Jitsu as the superior martial art, and to get new students to join them.

Rorion was a technical adviser for the 1987 movie Lethal Weapon providing training to actors Mel Gibson and Gary Busey. The director Richard Donner wanted Gibson's character to have a unique style of fighting never seen onscreen before with the second assistant director Willie Simmons, who was interested in unusual forms of martial arts, choosing BJJ and two other martial arts styles to use in the movie.

In 1988, Rorion produced the documentary Gracie Jiu-Jitsu In Action, the documentary contains footage of fights using jiu-jitsu, especially from Gracie Challenge and Vale Tudo fights. In 1989, Rorion with brothers Royce, Rickson and Royler, opened the first Gracie Jiu-Jitsu Academy in Torrance, California. In 1991, he produced The Basics of Gracie Jiu-Jitsu, a five volume training video series together with a special edition volume.

Rorion was also a technical advisor, a fight scene choreographer for Lethal Weapon 3 in 1992, providing training to Rene Russo together with martial artist Cheryl Wheeler-Dixon and a Karate instructor. The Karate instructor immediately went on to rehearse spectacular ura-mawashi high kicks, which resulted in Russo pulling a groin muscle the very first day, and becoming so frustrated with learning the technique, that Richard Donner asked Gracie not only to teach her, but also to attend the film set as a technical advisor. Gracie was so proficient and pliable in an uke role, that Russo refused to do the throw with anyone other than Gracie, and insisted him to step into the action as a stuntman for a fight scene.

In 1993, inspired by countless exhibition matches termed the "Gracie Challenge", a tradition that started with his uncle and Gracie jiu-jitsu co-founder Carlos Gracie, Rorion teamed with promoter and business executive Art Davie in the creation of the Ultimate Fighting Championship (UFC). Davie had always dreamed of an inter-discipline contest, pitting various martial arts against one another to determine the most effective. Rorion was only interested in showcasing his father's style, and demonstrating its dominance. Through this pay-per-view spectacle, he hoped to show that, in a "no time limit - no rules" setting, Gracie jiu-jitsu was the only system of self-defense that would give someone a realistic chance of defeating a larger, more athletic adversary. Davie recruited seven martial artists of different styles to participate in a single-elimination tournament. Rorion enlisted his brother Royce to represent the family style in the competition. Due to his smaller frame and relatively low body weight, Royce was the smallest competitor, making an excellent example of the powers of Gracie Jiu-Jitsu.

In 1994, following UFC, a small group of high-ranking military personnel, from the most elite unit in the US Army Special Operations Forces, contacted Rorion and asked him to develop an objective hand-to-hand combat course based on the most effective techniques of Gracie Jiu-Jitsu. The result was the Gracie Combatives military course that was taught to US Special Operations Forces, conventional US military units and the CIA. In January 2002, the techniques were the foundation of the official US Army Modern Army Combatives Program (MACP). The Gracie Resisting Attack Procedures for Law Enforcement (GRAPLE) was also concurrently developed with the combatives course, following a similar request from law enforcement for a defensive tactics training course, that was adopted by virtually all US law enforcement. The two courses were later merged to create the Gracie Survival Tactics (GST), a combative and defensive tactics course, for both military and law enforcement.

== Personal life ==
He is the father of martial artist Rener Gracie.

== Documentary ==
On July 6, 2023, it was announced that ESPN Films is producing a documentary series on the Gracie family directed by Chris Fuller and produced by Greg O'Connor and Guy Ritchie.

== Books ==
Rorion wrote and published the book The Gracie Diet in 2010.

== Videos ==
The Basics of Gracie Jiu-Jitsu® (video series)
Volume	Title	Subtitle
Volume 1	Get Close	How to Close the Distance Between You and Your Opponent.
Volume 2	Get Them Off	How to Escape from the Mounted Position.
Volume 3	Scissors	How To Pass the Guard.
Volume 4	Headlocks	How to Escape From Headlocks.
Volume 5	Finishing Holds	Arm Locks and Chokes.
	Bonus Tape	How to Handle Stand Up Aggression (Non Instructional.)

== Awards and honors ==
Black Belt Magazine named Rorion Gracie the 2006 Instructor of the Year.

== Instructor lineage ==
Kano Jigoro → Tomita Tsunejiro → Mitsuyo "Count Koma" Maeda → Carlos Gracie → Helio Gracie → Rorion Gracie

== See also ==
- List of Brazilian Jiu-Jitsu practitioners
- Gracie family
