= De'Alonzio Jackson =

American jiu-jitsu and mixed martial artist

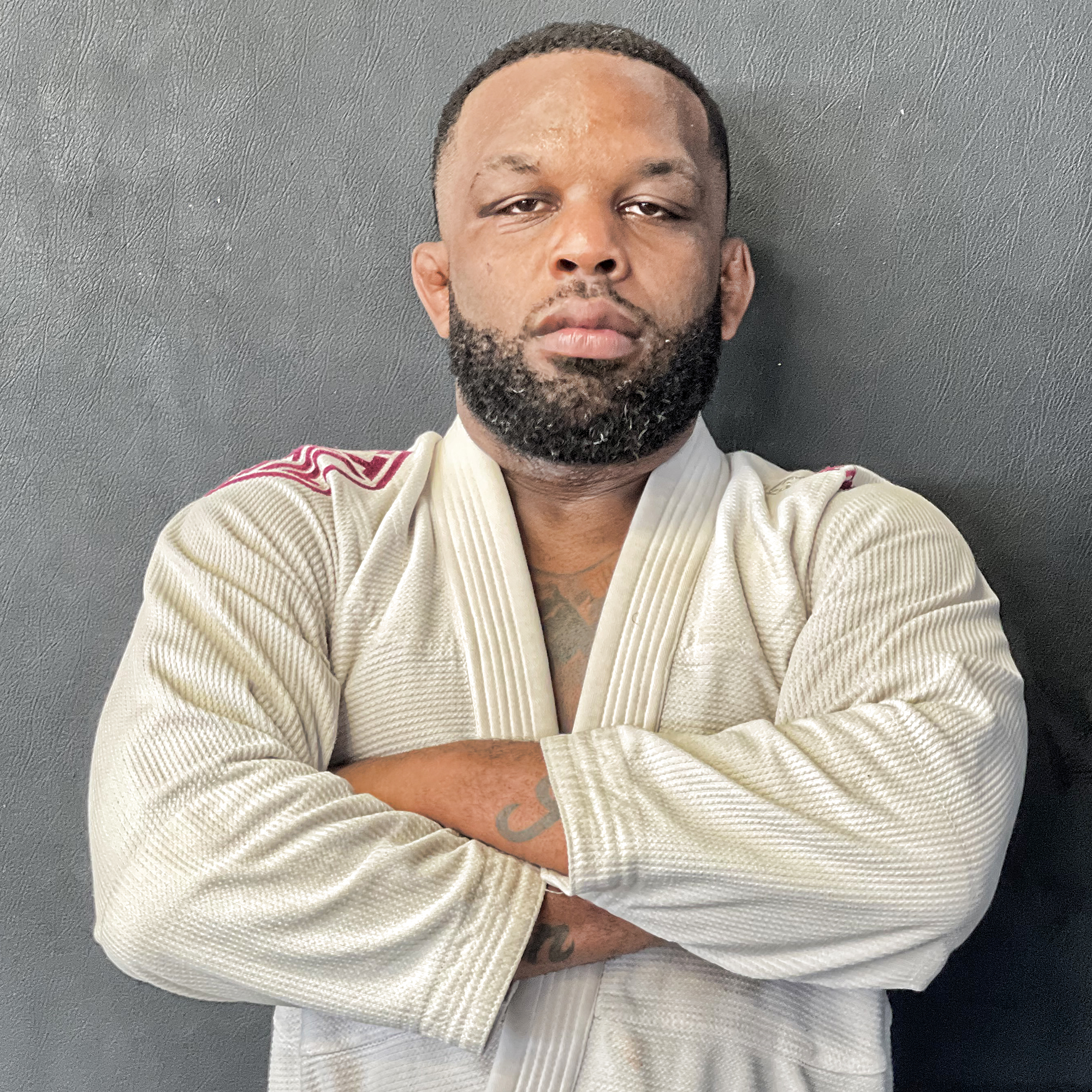
- Jackson in 2021
- Born: De'Alonzio Jerome Jackson; October 31, 1988 (age 37); Maryland, United States
- Other names: DJ Jackson; Kimura Kid
- Height: 173 cm (5 ft 8 in)
- Weight: 77 kg (170 lb; 12 st 2 lb)
- Division: Welterweight
- Style: Brazilian jiu-jitsu
- Fighting out of: Camp Springs, Maryland, United States
- Team: Team Lloyd Irvin
- Rank: Second Degree Black Belt in Brazilian Jiu-Jitsu under Lloyd Irvin
- Years active: 2012-present

Mixed martial arts record
- Total: 4
- Wins: 4
- By submission: 2
- By decision: 2
- Losses: 0

Other information
- Notable students: Stamp Fairtex, Uloomi Karim, Reza Goodary, Mark Abelardo, Anita Karim
- Mixed martial arts record from Sherdog

De'Alonzio Jackson (born 31 October 1988), known as DJ Jackson, is an American Brazilian jiu-jitsu practitioner and mixed martial artist based in Thailand. He is a multiple Brazilian jiu-jitsu world champions in IBJJF, ADCC, Pan American, Brazilian National and COPA de Bangkok. Jackson is the first African-American world Brazilian jiu-jitsu champion.

== Background ==
Jackson was born on 31 October 1988 in Maryland. He started sport with wrestling at DeMatha Catholic High School.

== Brazilian jiu-jitsu career ==
When DJ Jackson started practicing Brazilian jiu-jitsu on the Team Lloyd Irvin, he immediately caught the attention of his coach, Lloyd Irvin. He entered the competition very soon at the request of his coach. In a short time, he shone in prestigious competitions and eliminated all of his opponents. His high level of athleticism earned him a black belt in 2012 in less than four years.

== Mixed martial arts career ==
While practicing Brazilian jiu-jitsu, Jackson decided to practice and compete in mixed martial arts. He fought four times between 2015 and 2016, which resulted in four victories, including two submissions.

== Coaching career ==
Since 2019, Jackson has been an official Brazilian jiu-jitsu and mixed martial arts coach in Thailand. Under his leadership, his students, including Stamp Fairtex, Arash Mardani, Reza Goodary and Mark Abelardo, have won several international medals in important competitions including the Siam Cup BJJ and COPA de Bangkok.

== Personal life ==
=== Legal issues ===
In 2008, while attending college, Jackson was charged with third-degree sexual assault of a 16-year-old and supplying alcohol to a minor. He pleaded guilty to serious assault and had to pay a fine.

== Achievements ==
=== World No-Gi Brazilian Jiu-Jitsu Championship ===
- (gold) 2015 California, -79.5 kg Black belt, No-Gi
- (gold) 2013 California, -79.5 kg Black belt, No-Gi
- (gold) 2012 California, -79.5 kg Black belt, No-Gi

=== Pan-American No-Gi Championship ===
- (gold) 2012 California, -98 kg Black belt, No-Gi

=== COPA de Bangkok ===
- (gold) 2019 Bangkok, -82.3 kg Black belt, No-Gi
- (gold) 2019 Bangkok, -85 kg Black belt, Gi
- (gold) 2019 Bangkok, Open weight Black belt, No-Gi
- (bronze) 2019 Bangkok, Open weight Black belt, Gi

== Mixed martial arts record ==
Professional record breakdown
4 matches	4 wins	0 losses
By knockout	0	0
By submission	2	0
By decision	2	0

Res.	Record	Opponent	Method	Event	Date	Round	Time	Location	Notes
Win	4-0	Bassil Hafez	Decision (unanimous)	CFFC 61 - Anyanwu vs. Pinto	Oct 29, 2016	3	5:00	New Jersey, United States	
Win	3-0	Stacey Anderson	Submission (rear-naked choke)	SF - Shogun Fights 14	Apr 16, 2016	1	2:40	Virginia, United States	
Win	2-0	Piankhi Zimmerman	Decision (unanimous)	SF - Shogun Fights 13	Oct 24, 2016	3	5:00	Maryland, United States	
Win	1-0	Roy Smith	Submission (rear-naked choke)	Fire & Ice Fighting Championships - Fight for the Troops	Sep 19, 2015	1	0:45	Maryland, United States	

== Grappling record ==
Result	Opponent	Method	Competition	Weight	Stage	Year
Win	Rafael Barbosa	Points	NYC World Trials	83 kg	SF	2012
Loss	Lucas Leite	Referee Decision	NYC World Trials	83 kg	F	2012
Loss	Claudio Calasans	Referee Decision	World Pro.	82 kg	R2	2012
Win	Unknown	Wristlock	NoGi Worlds	82 kg	R1	2012
Win	Jason Manly	Pts: 11x0	NoGi Worlds	82 kg	4F	2012
Win	Vitor Oliveira	Pts: 0x0, Adv	NoGi Worlds	82 kg	SF	2012
Win	Clark Gracie	Pts: 5x0	NoGi Worlds	82 kg	F	2012
Win	James Puopolo	Pts: 0x0, Adv	NoGi Worlds	ABS	R1	2012
Win	Roberto Alencar	Pts: 4x0	NoGi Worlds	ABS	8F	2012
Loss	Leandro Lo	Pts: 0x0, Adv	NoGi Worlds	ABS	4F	2012
Loss	Claudio Calasans	Pts: 0x0, Pen	European Open	82 kg	4F	2013
Win	Rodrigo Breves	Points	NYC World Trials	83 kg	N/A	2013
Win	Felipe Matos	Adv	Pan American	ABS	R1	2013
Win	Gabriel Vella	Pts: 2x0	Pan American	ABS	R2	2013
Win	Bernardo Faria	Pts: 12x0	Pan American	ABS	4F	2013
Win	Gabriel Rollo	Adv	Pan American	82 kg	R2	2013
Win	Rafael Barbosa	Wristlock	Pan American	82 kg	4F	2013
Loss	Clark Gracie	Referee Decision	Pan American	82 kg	SF	2013
Loss	Claudio Calasans	Pts: 0x0, Adv	World Pro	82 kg	R1	2013
Win	Magid Hage	Pts: 2x0	World Champ.	ABS	RDS	2013
Loss	Leonardo Leite	Points	World Champ.	ABS	RDS	2013
Draw	Tio Chico	N/A	Copa Podio	76 kg	GP	2013
Win	Oliver Geddes	Wristlock	Copa Podio	76 kg	GP	2013
Loss	Vinicius Marinho	Adv	Copa Podio	76 kg	GP	2013
Win	Rodrigo Magalhaes	Pts: 2x0	Copa Podio	76 kg	GP	2013
Loss	Leandro Lo	Pts: 6x2	Copa Podio	76 kg	SF	2013
Loss	Vinicius Marinho	Pen	Copa Podio	76 kg	3PLC	2013
Loss	AJ Agazarm	Referee Decision	ADCC	77 kg	R1	2013
Loss	Vitor Oliveira	Points	NoGi Worlds	82 kg	SF	2013
Win	Abmar Barbosa	Pts: 3x0	Boston W. Open	82 kg	SF	2013
Win	Gregor Gracie	Pts: 2x0	Boston W. Open	82 kg	F	2013
Win	Abmar Barbosa	Points	Boston W. Open	ABS	SF	2013
Win	Rafael Barbosa	Pts: 6x0	Boston W. Open	ABS	F	2013
Win	Garry Tonon	Points	ADCC Nationals	ABS	SPF	2014
Win	Unknown	Submission	Pan American	ABS	R2	2014
Loss	Andre Galvao	Points	Pan American	ABS	R3	2014
Loss	Diego Hertzog	Pts: 2x2, Adv	Pan American	88 kg	R1	2014
Win	Unknown	Wristlock	World Champ.	76 kg	R1	2014
Loss	Rodrigo Freitas	Pen	World Champ.	76 kg	R1	2014
Win	Manuel Ribamar	Pts: 2x0	NoGi Worlds	79 kg	8F	2015
Win	Vinicius Agudo	Pts: 5x0	NoGi Worlds	79 kg	4F	2015
Win	Otavio Sousa	Referee Decision	NoGi Worlds	79 kg	SF	2015
Win	Jonathan Satava	Pts: 3x0	NoGi Worlds	79 kg	F	2015
Win	Eliot Kelly	Referee Decision	NoGi Worlds	ABS	R1	2015
Win	Guybson Sa	Pts: 6x0	NoGi Worlds	ABS	8F	2015
Win	Caio Terra	Pts: 0x0, Adv	NoGi Worlds	ABS	4F	2015
Loss	Felipe Pena	RNC	NoGi Worlds	ABS	SF	2015
Win	Bruno Bastos	Arm in guillotine	EBI 6	ABS	R1	2016
Loss	Rustam Chsiev	EBI/OT	EBI 6	ABS	4F	2016
Win	Corey Brown	Pts: 24x0	Grappling Pro	77 kg	4F	2016
Win	Garry Tonon	Pts: 7x2	Grappling Pro	77 kg	SF	2016
Win	Lucas Barbosa	Pts: 6x3	Grappling Pro	77 kg	F	2016
Win	John Combs	Guillotine	F2W Pro 18	82 kg	SPF	2016
Win	Vinicius Agudo	Brabo choke	F2W Pro 29	82 kg	SPF	2017
Win	Cora Talamoni	Americana	ADCC WC Trials	88 kg	R1	2017
Win	Ty Freeman	Referee Decision	ADCC WC Trials	88 kg	8F	2017
Win	Kevin Crane	Pts: 4x0	ADCC WC Trials	88 kg	4F	2017
Win	Antonio Zuazo	Pts: 5x0	ADCC WC Trials	88 kg	SF	2017
Loss	John Salter	Pen	ADCC WC Trials	88 kg	F	2017
Win	Jose Portillo	N/A	Miami Spring Open	88 kg	SF	2017
Win	Jurandir Conceicao	Pts: 3x0	Miami Spring Open	88 kg	F	2017
Win	Josh Littleton	Brabo choke	Miami Spring Open	ABS	4F	2017
Win	Valdir Araujo	Points	Miami Spring Open	ABS	SF	2017
Loss	Roberto Abreu	Pts: 25x0	Miami Spring Open	ABS	F	2017
Win	Vagner Rocha	Pts: 25x8	Grappling Pro	77 kg	SPF	2017
Win	Nick Calvanese	Pts: 0x0, Adv	NY Summer Open	88 kg	SF	2017
Win	Jonathan Satava	N/A	NY Summer Open	88 kg	F	2017
Win	Enrique Galarza	N/A	NY Summer Open	ABS	4F	2017
Loss	Marcos Tinoco	Referee Decision	NY Summer Open	ABS	SF	2017
Win	Aaron Johnson	Points	NY S. No-Gi Open	ABS	SF	2017
Win	James Brasco	Inside heel hook	F2W Pro 42	88 kg	SPF	2017
Win	Tommy Langaker	Points	Copa Podio	88 kg	RR	2017
Win	Kywan Gracie	Pts: 0x0, Adv	Copa Podio	88 kg	RR	2017
Win	F. Andrew	Pts: 0x0, Adv	Copa Podio	88 kg	RR	2017
Win	Hugo Marques	Pts: 4x2	Copa Podio	88 kg	RR	2017
Win	Gustavo Braguinha	Adv	Copa Podio	88 kg	SF	2017
Win	F. Andrew	Adv	Copa Podio	88 kg	F	2017
Win	Greg Walker	Pts: 0x0, Adv	Washington Open	82 kg	F	2017
Win	Leo Saggioro	Referee Decision	ADCC	77 kg	E1	2017
Loss	Vagner Rocha	Referee Decision	ADCC	77 kg	4F	2017
Win	Donghyun Kim	Pts: 2x0	Spyder Invitational	ABS	SPF	2017
Win	Gilbert Burns	Referee Decision	F2W Pro 53	82 kg	SPF	2017
Win	Alberto Gonzalez	Submission	Spain Nat. Pro	94 kg	SF	2018
Win	Adam Wardzinski	Pts: 0x0, Adv	Spain Nat. Pro	94 kg	F	2018
Win	Nick Calvanese	Referee Decision	F2W Pro 71	84 kg	SPF	2018
Win	Tanner Rice	Pts: 0x0, Adv	WP US Qualifier	94 kg	RR	2018
Loss	Tanner Rice	Pts: 0x0, Pen	WP US Qualifier	94 kg	RR	2018
Loss	Tanner Rice	Adv	WP US Qualifier	94 kg	RR	2018
Loss	Murilo Santana	Pts: 0x0, Pen	World Champ.	88 kg	R1	2018
Win	Sami Baki	Kimura	Boa Super 8	ABS	4F	2018
Win	Stuart Cooper	Pts: 3x0	Boa Super 8	ABS	SF	2018
Win	Craig Jones	Pts: 0x0, Pen	Boa Super 8	ABS	F	2018
Win	Craig Jones	Referee Decision	Spider Inv. 4F	76 kg	SPF	2018
Win	Takagi Shota	Brabo choke	Grand Slam TYO	85 kg	4F	2018
Win	Alan Fidelis	Armbar	Grand Slam TYO	85 kg	SF	2018
Win	Bradley Hill	Pts: 5x0	Grand Slam TYO	85 kg	F	2018
Win	Jamie Fletcher	Guillotine	Subversiv	ABS	SF	2018
Win	Richie Martinez	Kimura	Subversiv	ABS	F	2018
Win	Rafael Domingos	Points	Black Belt CBD	83 kg	SF	2018
Loss	Gilbert Burns	Points	Black Belt CBD	83 kg	F	2018
Loss	V. Hugo	Pts: 16x0	Spyder Inv. Final	76 kg	SF	2018
Loss	Manuel Ribamar	Pts: 6x0	Grand Slam AD	85 kg	4F	2019
Win	Donghyun Kim	Pts: 2x0	Spyder Invitational	ABS	SPF	2017
Win	Gilbert Burns	Referee Decision	F2W Pro 53	82 kg	SPF	2017
Win	Alberto Gonzalez	Submission	Spain Nat. Pro	94 kg	SF	2018
Win	Adam Wardzinski	Pts: 0x0, Adv	Spain Nat. Pro	94 kg	F	2018
Win	Nick Calvanese	Referee Decision	F2W Pro 71	84 kg	SPF	2018
Win	Tanner Rice	Pts: 0x0, Adv	WP US Qualifier	94 kg	RR	2018
Loss	Tanner Rice	Pts: 0x0, Pen	WP US Qualifier	94 kg	RR	2018
Loss	Tanner Rice	Adv	WP US Qualifier	94 kg	RR	2018
Loss	Murilo Santana	Pts: 0x0, Pen	World Champ.	88 kg	R1	2018
Win	Sami Baki	Kimura	Boa Super 8	ABS	4F	2018
Win	Stuart Cooper	Pts: 3x0	Boa Super 8	ABS	SF	2018
Win	Craig Jones	Pts: 0x0, Pen	Boa Super 8	ABS	F	2018
Win	Craig Jones	Referee Decision	Spider Inv. 4F	76 kg	SPF	2018
Win	Takagi Shota	Brabo choke	Grand Slam TYO	85 kg	4F	2018
Win	Alan Fidelis	Armbar	Grand Slam TYO	85 kg	SF	2018
Win	Bradley Hill	Pts: 5x0	Grand Slam TYO	85 kg	F	2018
Win	Jamie Fletcher	Guillotine	Subversiv	ABS	SF	2018
Win	Richie Martinez	Kimura	Subversiv	ABS	F	2018
Win	Rafael Domingos	Points	Black Belt CBD	83 kg	SF	2018
Loss	Gilbert Burns	Points	Black Belt CBD	83 kg	F	2018
Loss	V. Hugo	Pts: 16x0	Spyder Inv. Final	76 kg	SF	2018
Loss	Manuel Ribamar	Pts: 6x0	Grand Slam AD	85 kg	4F	2019
Win	Roberto Satoshi	Wristlock	King of Mats II	85 kg	RR	2019
Win	Diego Ramalho	Pts: 0x0, Adv	King of Mats II	85 kg	RR	2019
Loss	Manuel Ribamar	Pts: 9x0	King of Mats II	85 kg	RR	2019
Loss	Isaque Bahiense	Referee Decision	King of Mats II	85 kg	RR	2019
Win	Marc Akakpovi	Submission	Netherlands Pro	85 kg	SF	2019
Win	Arthur Pucci	Submission	Netherlands Pro	85 kg	F	2019
Loss	Isaque Bahiense	Referee Decision	BJJ Stars	88 kg	SPF	2019
Loss	Manuel Ribamar	Referee Decision	F2W Pro 104	85 kg	SPF	2019
Loss	Murilo Santana	Referee Decision	F2W Pro 108	85 kg	SPF	2019
Win	Scott Jutras	Kimura	Washington DCO	82 kg	4F	2019
Loss	Felipe Cesar	Pts: 15x0	Washington DCO	82 kg	SF	2019
Win	Brian Beaury	Injury	Washington DCO	ABS	4F	2019
Win	Diogo Sampaio	Pts: 0x0, Adv	Washington DCO	ABS	SF	2019
Win	Vinicius Trator	Pts: 0x0, Adv	Washington DCO	ABS	F	2019
Win	Arnaldo Maidana	Referee Decision	F2W Pro 109	85 kg	SPF	2019
Win	Viking Wong	Pts: 3x0	World Pro	85 kg	4F	2019
Loss	Faisal AlKitbe	Pts: 0x0, Adv	World Pro	85 kg	SF	2019
Win	Philippe Pomaski	Pts: 2x0	World Pro	85 kg	RPC	2019
Win	Devhonte Johnson	Referee Decision	World Pro	85 kg	3RD	2019
Win	Alexandre Pimentel	Points Miami	Spring Open	82 kg	SF	2019
Win	Brian Beaury	Points Miami	Spring Open	82 kg	F	2019
Win	Enrique Galarza	Submission	High Rollerz	ABS	4F	2019
Win	Evani Chavez	Submission	High Rollerz	ABS	SF	2019
Win	Michael Egley	Submission	High Rollerz	ABS	F	2019
Win	Nathan Mendelsohn	Points	World Champ.	82 kg	R1	2019
Loss	Claudio Calasans	Pts: 0x0, Adv	World Champ.	82 kg	R2	2019
Loss	K. Steele	Referee Decision	Third Coast	88 kg	SPF	2019
Win	Ruben Rivera	EBI/OT	Subversiv 2	75 kg	SPF	2019
Loss	Edwin Najmi	Referee Decision	F2W Pro 120	82 kg	SPF	2019
Win	John Combs	Pts: 5x0	ADCC	77 kg	R1	2019
Loss	JT Torres	Pts: 3x0	ADCC	77 kg	4F	2019

== See also ==
- World No-Gi Brazilian Jiu-Jitsu Championship
- COPA de Bangkok
