= Gracie Jiu-Jitsu (book) =

2006 jiu-jitsu instructional book

- Author: Helio Gracie
- Language: Portuguese
- Subject: martial arts
- Publisher: Editora Saraiva
- Publication date: 2006
- Publication place: São Paulo, Brazil
- Pages: 273
- ISBN: 9780975941119
- OCLC: 64025877

Gracie Jiu-Jitsu is a self-defence martial arts system instructional book written by Helio Gracie. Its first edition was published in 2006 by Editora Saraiva.

== Summary ==
The book describes Brazilian jiu-jitsu (BJJ) techniques. The back cover says: "Helio Gracie, creator of the Gracie Jiu-jitsu, had a weak health in adolescence, being forbidden to perform any physical activity, until the chance put him on the tatami. His fascinants results, inside and out the ring, thrilled all a nation and made him the first hero of Brazilian sport. After dedicating all of his life to this style of fight, Helio presents his first and unique book about the art that has made him a triumphant man. Born in 1913, now he lives in Itaipava, in Rio, and teaches the jiu-jitsu". Grandmaster Gracie died only a few years later on January 29, 2009.

== Style ==
The book discusses the notion that BJJ is one of the most effective martial arts. This claim would be later be proven correct by the success of the style in the UFC.

== Chapters ==
- 1 – Defenses in position stand up, against attacks by front
- 2 – Defenses in position stand up, against attacks by back
- 3 – Defenses against guns
- 4 – Mount
- 5 – Guard
- 6 – Side mount (100 kg) Note: Side mount is the traditional name given to the position. Nowadays, in Brazil, it's called 100 kg.
- 7 – Back mount
- Appendix – the Gracie diet
