= COPA de Bangkok =

Brazilian Jiu-Jitsu competitions

Competition details
- Competition date(s): 2019 (Halted in 2020 due to the COVID-19 pandemic)
- Location: Bangkok, Thailand
- Discipline: Brazilian Jiu-Jitsu
- Type: Martial arts competitions
- Organiser: Bangkok Fight Lab
- Director(s): Morgan Perkins

Divisions
- Current weight divisions: Ultra Heavyweight: over 221.0 lbs (+100.5 kg) Super Heavyweight: under 221.0 lbs (–100.5 kg); Heavyweight: under 207.5 lbs (–94.3 kg); Medium Heavyweight: under 194.5 lbs (–88.3 kg); Middleweight: under 181.0 lbs (–82.3 kg); Lightweight: under 167.5 lbs (–76 kg); Featherweight: under 154.0 lbs (–70 kg); Light Featherweight: under 141.0 lbs (–64 kg); Roosterweight: under 126.5 lbs (–57 kg); Female over 80 kg under 80 kg under 74 kg under 69 kg under 64 kg under 58 kg under 53 kg under 48 kg (with gi)

History
- First edition: 2008

COPA De Bangkok is a Brazilian jiu-jitsu competition that developed from "BJJ Thailand open" in 2008 which are created by a group of "BJJ gyms" in Bangkok.

== History ==
Since 2016, Bangkok Fight Lab, under the management of Morgan Perkins, has been responsible for holding the event. This caused the technical level of the competition to be regulated by IBJJF and ADCC standards. Every year, more than 400 participants from more than 50 countries compete in this event. But in 2020, the tournament was canceled due to restrictions imposed by the Thai government due to the COVID-19 pandemic.

== Divisions ==
The following is a sample of the divisions used by Copa de Bangkok divided into their respective weight brackets.

=== Youth ===
	YOUTH6 years and under(No-Gi and BJJ)	YOUTH7-9 yrs. old(No-Gi and BJJ)	YOUTH10-12 yrs. old(No-Gi and BJJ)	TEENS13-15 yrs. old(No-Gi and BJJ)	TEENS16-17 yrs. old(No-Gi and BJJ)
Lightweight	49.9 lbs. & under	59.9 lbs. & under	79.9 lbs. & under	99.9 lbs. & under	119.9 lbs. & under
Middleweight	50-59.9 lbs.	60-69.9 lbs.	80-89.9 lbs.	100-114.9 lbs.	120-134.9 lbs.
Cruiserweight	60-69.9 lbs.	70-79.9 lbs.	90-99.9 lbs.	115-129.9 lbs.	135-149.9 lbs.
Heavyweight	70 lbs. & over	80 lbs. & over	100 lbs. & over	130 lbs. & over	150-169.9 lbs.
Superweight	N/A	N/A	N/A	N/A	170 lbs. & over

=== Women ===
	NO-GI BEGINNER(12 months training or Less)	NO-GI ADVANCED(12 months training or more)	BJJ WHITE BELT	BLUE BELT	PURPLE/BROWN/BLACK BELT
Class A	119.9 lbs. & under	119.9 lbs. & under	119.9 lbs. & under	119.9 lbs. & under	N/A
Class B	120-139.9 lbs.	120-139.9 lbs.	120-139.9 lbs.	120-139.9 lbs.	N/A
Class C	140-159.9 lbs.	140-159.9 lbs.	140-159.9 lbs.	140-159.9 lbs.	N/A
Class D	160 lbs. +	160 lbs. +	160 lbs. +	160 lbs. +	N/A
Absolute	Open Weight	Open Weight	N/A	N/A	Open Weight

=== Men ===
Men's No-Gi
Weight class	NOVICELess than 9 Months TrainingNo Wrestlers	BEGINNER9-18 Months Training	INTERMEDIATE18-36 Months Training	ADVANCED36+ Months Training
Bantam	129.9 lbs. & below	129.9 lbs. & below	129.9 lbs. & below	129.9 lbs. & below
Flyweight	130-139 lbs.	130-139 lbs.	130-139 lbs.	130-139 lbs.
Feather	140-149 lbs.	140-149 lbs.	140-149 lbs.	140-149 lbs.
Light	150-159 lbs.	150-159 lbs.	150-159 lbs.	150-159 lbs.
Welter	160-169 lbs.	160-169 lbs.	160-169 lbs.	160-169 lbs.
Middle	170-179 lbs.	170-179 lbs.	170-179 lbs.	170-179 lbs.
Cruiser	180-189 lbs.	180-189 lbs.	180-189 lbs.	180-189 lbs.
Light-Heavy	190-199 lbs.	190-199 lbs.	190-199 lbs.	190-199 lbs.
Heavy	200-209 lbs.	200-209 lbs.	200-209 lbs.	200-209 lbs.
Super	210 lbs. +	210 lbs. +	210 lbs. +	210 lbs. +
Absolute	Open Weight	Open Weight	Open Weight	Open Weight

== Rules ==
=== No-Gi ===
Round time	Divisions
4 Minutes	Children/Teens, Women's Beginner, Men's Novice & Men's Beginner
5 Minutes	Men's Intermediate, Women's Intermediate & Men's Executive & Masters
6 Minutes	Men's/Women's Advanced

=== Gi ===
Round time	Divisions
4 Minutes	Children & teens
5 Minutes	White belts
6 Minutes	Blue belts
7 Minutes	Purple belts
8 Minutes	Brown belt
10 Minutes	Black belts

== COPA De Bangkok 2019 ==
COPA de Bangkok Brazilian Jiu-Jitsu competition was held on November 23–24, 2019 at National Stadium in Bangkok. The presence of 477 Fighters from all over the world has increased the importance of the championships.

=== List of men champions ===
==== Male Gi / White / Adult ====
Weight	Gold	Silver	Bronze
-64 kg	(Thailand) Solos Sinchaitan	(Indonesia) Audric Lauw	(Indonesia) Adriano Firizky
-64 kg	(Thailand) Solos Sinchaitan	(Indonesia) Audric Lauw	(United States) Zach Miller
-70 kg	(France) Aymeric Laurencic	(United States) Dustin Shiau	(Thailand) Ittikorn Pakdeewong
-70 kg	(France) Aymeric Laurencic	(United States) Dustin Shiau	(United States) Michael Cornwallis
-76 kg	(Thailand) Ratanapidech Jantanakha	(Italy) Antonio Marcello Fedele	(Thailand) Phatiphan Atrhinkong
-76 kg	(Thailand) Ratanapidech Jantanakha	(Italy) Antonio Marcello Fedele	(Thailand) Jun Santipongchai
-82.3 kg	(Canada) Ramy Djellal	(Taiwan) TSU HAU Mo	
-88.3 kg	(Thailand) Jitt Kasemsri	(Switzerland) Dario Dome	(Thailand) Ben Klinsukorn
+100.5 kg	(Thailand) Prab Watabunditkul	(India) Prateek Iqbal Kharb	(Canada) Hamza Aloui

==== Male Gi / White / Master 1 (30+) ====
Weight	Gold	Silver	Bronze
-57,5 kg	(United States) Kevin Koplar	(Singapore) Shaikh Ahmad Zahid	
-70 kg	(Taiwan) YuHsien Wang	(United States) John Rosplock	
-76 kg	(Thailand) Kittipong Jumpeesri	(Taiwan) Wei Ting Lin	(United Kingdom) Daniel Cooper
-88.3 kg	(Russia) Pavel Schweik	(Taiwan) N/A	(United Kingdom) Andrew Grindlay
-94.3 kg	(Iran) Reza Goodary	(India) Aaron Arul	(Netherlands) Chee ming Chan

==== Male Gi / White / Master 2 (36+) ====
Weight	Gold	Silver	Bronze
-70 kg	(Thailand) Wisawa Kaveekavakorn	(Thailand) Krissda Kanittasoontorn	
-76 kg	(Malaysia) Khim Sun Lau	(United States) Justin Judah	(South Korea) Sangin lion Jung
-76 kg	(Malaysia) Khim Sun Lau	(United States) Justin Judah	(Scotland) Marek Miedzybrodzki
-76 kg	(Thailand) David Sutthaluang	(Italy) Stefano Gaidano	(Malaysia) Abdul Rahim Haron
-88.3 kg	(United States) Meade McDermott	(Singapore) Chee Keong Tan	(Thailand) Aekchai Bumroechoke
-88.3 kg	(United States) Meade McDermott	(Singapore) Chee Keong Tan	(Germany) Michael Buchinger
+100.5 kg	(United Kingdom) Lee Murphy	(Thailand) Kitti Chutburanonthachai	

==== Male Gi / Blue / Adult ====
Weight	Gold	Silver	Bronze
-64 kg	(Thailand) Chonlatee Aramvibool	(Thailand) Nattapat Khamwan	(Thailand) Thoranis Karnasuta
-64 kg	(Thailand) Chonlatee Aramvibool	(Thailand) Nattapat Khamwan	(France) William GURGUI
-76 kg	(Thailand) Jitwisut Keesuriya	(Thailand) Sarin Soonthorn	(United States) Rusty Rehl
-76 kg	(Thailand) Jitwisut Keesuriya	(Thailand) Sarin Soonthorn	(Thailand) Sirirot Sinchaitan
-76 kg	(Kazakhstan) Nursultan Aganin	(Algeria) Mehdi Meghzifene	(Thailand) Jatupol Leaupathanasuk
-76 kg	(Kazakhstan) Nursultan Aganin	(Algeria) Mehdi Meghzifene	(United States) Casey Roof
-82.3 kg	(Russia) Alikhan Visimbaev	(China) Hua Feng He	(Thailand) Nawaphon Kokarunpong
-82.3 kg	(Russia) Alikhan Visimbaev	(China) Hua Feng He	(United Kingdom) Scott Martin

==== Male Gi / Blue / Master 1 (30+) ====
Weight	Gold	Silver	Bronze
-64 kg	(Malaysia) Ong Ee Xun	(Netherlands) Arno Nabuurs	(Thailand) Suradate Wilaipan
-70 kg	(Thailand) Mangthus Rewtawee	(Thailand) Anthony Ryu	(Japan) Yoshifumi Nao
-70 kg	(Thailand) Mangthus Rewtawee	(Thailand) Anthony Ryu	(Singapore) Yusran Ahzam
-76 kg	(Russia) Miroslav Veliev	(Thailand) Pithak Phoogphun	(Philippines) Eduardo II Alcanzare
-94.3 kg	(Kazakhstan) Faizkhan Boribekov	(China) Peng Guo	
+100.5 kg	(Iran) Arash Mardani	(Thailand) Chakrit Chidsin	(United States) James Woodard

==== Male Gi / Blue / Master 2 (36+) ====
Weight	Gold	Silver	Bronze
-82.3 kg	(Russia) Sergei Cuzmin		
-88.3 kg	(Thailand) Ratcharat S	(Thailand) David Sriariyarungruang	(Italy) Gianluca Passoni
-88.3 kg	(Thailand) Ratcharat S	(Thailand) David Sriariyarungruang	(Thailand) Thanawat Manawongsakul

==== Male Gi / Purple / Adult ====
Weight	Gold	Silver	Bronze
-76 kg	(Thailand) Phakorn Ngamganokwan	(Thailand) Chayut Rojanakat	(United States) Thomas Murphy
-82.3 kg	(Australia) Campbell Symes	(Indonesia) Muhammad Aldy Dharmawan	(United States) Vincent Harvey
-82.3 kg	(Australia) Campbell Symes	(Indonesia) Muhammad Aldy Dharmawan	(Malaysia) Raymond Tan Hean Ming

==== Male Gi / Purple / Master 1 (30+) ====
Weight	Gold	Silver	Bronze
-70 kg	(Chile) Williams Aranguiz	(Thailand) Atiwat Suvinijjit	

==== Male Gi / Purple / Master 2 (36+) ====
Weight	Gold	Silver	Bronze
-70 kg	(Philippines) JP Buduan	(Thailand) Kwan Chinachote	
-76 kg	(United Kingdom) Charles Reed	(Thailand) Shin Watanabe	
-94.3 kg	(Russia) Anton Kim	(Switzerland) Marco Kuster	
+100.5 kg	(United Kingdom) Mark Straughan	(United States) Jonathan Fisher	

==== Male Gi / Brown / Adult ====
Weight	Gold	Silver	Bronze
-70 kg	(Australia) Journ Tang	(Thailand) Pons Ponce	(Japan) Masato Kono

==== Male Gi / Brown / Master 1 (30+) ====
Weight	Gold	Silver	Bronze
-70 kg	(Canada) Demitri Telfair		

==== Male Gi / Brown / Master 2 (36+) ====
Weight	Gold	Silver	Bronze
-76 kg	(Thailand) Pons Ponce	(United States) Tony Perticaro	

==== Male Gi / Black / Adult ====
Weight	Gold	Silver	Bronze
-82.3 kg	(United States) De'Alonzio Jackson	(Brazil) Bruno Amorim	(Brazil) Alisson Braga

==== Male No-Gi / Beginner / Adult ====
Weight	Gold	Silver	Bronze
-67 kg	(Thailand) Phasit Suppharojdilok	(Sweden) Enes Ahmemulic	(Thailand) Chatchawit Techarukpong
-67 kg	(Thailand) Phasit Suppharojdilok	(Sweden) Enes Ahmemulic	(France) William Gurgui
-73 kg	(Thailand) Sirirot Sinchaitan	(Thailand) Phatiphan Atrhinkong	(Vietnam) Tung Le Thanh
-79 kg	(Thailand) David Sutthaluang	(Thailand) Tanat Kruanpinit	
-85 kg	(Ukraine) Anton Grytsenko	(Thailand) Ben Klinsukorn	(Taiwan) Tsu Hau Mo

==== Male No-Gi / Beginner / Master 1 (30+) ====
Weight	Gold	Silver	Bronze
-67 kg	(Thailand) Wisawa Kaveekavakorn	(Taiwan) YuHsien Wang	(United States) Kevin Koplar
-91 kg	(Iran) Reza Goodary	(India) Aaron Arul	
+97 kg	(Thailand) Chakrit Chidsin	(India) Prateek Iqbal Kharb	(Philippines) Raymund Matabang

==== Male No-Gi / Beginner / Master 2 (36+) ====
Weight	Gold	Silver	Bronze
-73 kg	(Malaysia) Khim Sun Lau	(Scotland) Marek Miedzybrodzki	

==== Male No-Gi / Intermediate / Adult ====
Weight	Gold	Silver	Bronze
-73 kg	(United States) Casey Roof	(United States) Thomas Murphy	(Vietnam) Duc Pham Anh
-73 kg	(United States) Casey Roof	(United States) Thomas Murphy	(Thailand) Chayut Rojanakat
-79 kg	(Germany) Alexander Scheck	(China) Hua Feng He	
-69 kg	(Japan) Koki Ichikawa	(Kazakhstan) Faizkhan Boribekov	

==== Male No-Gi / Intermediate / Master 1 (30+) ====
Weight	Gold	Silver	Bronze
-67 kg	(Chile) Williams Aranguiz	(Sweden) Martin Lindkvist	
-85 kg	(Vietnam) Tuan Bui Anh	(Malaysia) Raymond Tan Hean Ming	
+97 kg	(Iran) Arash Mardani	(United States) Jonathan Fisher	

==== Male No-Gi / Intermediate / Master 2 (36+) ====
Weight	Gold	Silver	Bronze
-67 kg	(Philippines) JP Buduan	(Netherlands) Arno Nabuurs	(Thailand) Sarun Satawin
-85 kg	(Switzerland) Marco Kuster	(Indonesia) Aseanto Oudang	(Russia) Sergei Cuzmin

==== Male No-Gi / Advanced / Adult ====
Weight	Gold	Silver	Bronze
-73 kg	(Australia) Lucas Cannon	(Japan) Masato Kono	(United States) Dan Zalewski
-85 kg	(United States) De'Alonzio Jackson	(Australia) Campbell Symes	(Canada) Demitri Telfair
-85 kg	(United States) De'Alonzio Jackson	(Australia) Campbell Symes	(United States) Daniel Larman

==== Male Absolute Gi / White / Adult ====
Weight	Gold	Silver	Bronze
Open	(Thailand) Phatiphan Atrhinkong	(Thailand) Ben Klinsukorn	(Thailand) Jitt Kasemsri
Open	(Thailand) Phatiphan Atrhinkong	(Thailand) Ben Klinsukorn	(Thailand) Solos Sinchaitan

==== Male Absolute Gi / White / Master 1 (30+) ====
Weight	Gold	Silver	Bronze
Open	(France) Aymeric Laurencic	(Iran) Reza Goodary	(United Kingdom) Daniel Cooper
Open	(France) Aymeric Laurencic	(Iran) Reza Goodary	(Russia) Pavel Shvaiko

==== Male Absolute Gi / White / Master 2 (36+) ====
Weight	Gold	Silver	Bronze
Open	(Malaysia) Abdul Rahim Haron	(United Kingdom) Lee Murphy	(Thailand) David Sutthaluang
Open	(Malaysia) Abdul Rahim Haron	(United Kingdom) Lee Murphy	(Germany) Michael Buchinger

==== Male Absolute Gi / Blue / Adult ====
Weight	Gold	Silver	Bronze
Open	(United States) Seth Sarrett	(Hong Kong) Brad Choi	(Thailand) Jatupol Leaupathanasuk
Open	(United States) Seth Sarrett	(Hong Kong) Brad Choi	(United Kingdom) Scott Martin

==== Male Absolute Gi / Blue / Master 1 (30+) ====
Weight	Gold	Silver	Bronze
Open	(Iran) Arash Mardani	(Thailand) Mangthus Rewtawee	(Thailand) Suradate Wilaipan
Open	(Iran) Arash Mardani	(Thailand) Mangthus Rewtawee	(Thailand) Anthony Ryu

==== Male Absolute Gi / Blue / Master 2 (36+) ====
Weight	Gold	Silver	Bronze
Open	(Thailand) Ratcharat S	(Italy) Gianluca Passoni	(Philippines) Eduardo II Alcanzare

==== Male Absolute Gi / Purple / Adult ====
Weight	Gold	Silver	Bronze
Open	(Australia) Campbell Symes	(Japan) Koki Ichikawa	(Indonesia) Muhammad Aldy Dharmawan
Open	(Australia) Campbell Symes	(Japan) Koki Ichikawa	(United States) Vincent Harvey

==== Male Absolute Gi / Purple / Master 2 (36+) ====
Weight	Gold	Silver	Bronze
Open	(United States) Jonathan Fisher	(United Kingdom) Charles Reed	(Philippines) JP Buduan
Open	(United States) Jonathan Fisher	(United Kingdom) Charles Reed	(Russia) Anton Kim

==== Male Absolute Gi / Brown / Adult ====
Weight	Gold	Silver	Bronze
Open	(Japan) Masato Kono	(Thailand) Pons Ponce	

==== Male Absolute Gi / Brown / Master 1 (30+) ====
Weight	Gold	Silver	Bronze
Open	(Canada) Demitri Telfair	(Thailand) Pons Ponce	

==== Male Absolute Gi / Black / Adult ====
Weight	Gold	Silver	Bronze
Open	(Brazil) Alisson Braga	(Brazil) Bruno Amorim	(United States) De'Alonzio Jackson

==== Male Absolute No-Gi / Beginner / Adult ====
Weight	Gold	Silver	Bronze
Open	(Thailand) Ben Klinsukorn	(Thailand) Phatiphan Atrhinkong	(Ukraine) Anton Grytsenko

==== Male Absolute No-Gi / Beginner / Master 1 (30+) ====
Weight	Gold	Silver	Bronze
Open	(Iran) Reza Goodary	(France) Sebastien Molina	

==== Male Absolute No-Gi / Beginner / Master 2 (36+) ====
Weight	Gold	Silver	Bronze
Open	(Thailand) David Sutthaluang	(Scotland) Marek Miedzybrodzki	

==== Male Absolute No-Gi / Intermediate / Adult ====
Weight	Gold	Silver	Bronze
Open	(Japan) Koki Ichikawa	(Kazakhstan) Faizkhan Boribekov	(United States) Thomas Murphy
Open	(Japan) Koki Ichikawa	(Kazakhstan) Faizkhan Boribekov	(Kazakhstan) Nursultan Aganin

==== Male Absolute No-Gi / Intermediate / Master 1 (30+) ====
Weight	Gold	Silver	Bronze
Open	(India) Prateek Iqbal Kharb	(Sweden) Martin Lindkvist	(Vietnam) Tuan Bui Anh
Open	(India) Prateek Iqbal Kharb	(Sweden) Martin Lindkvist	(Kazakhstan) Nursultan Aganin

==== Male Absolute No-Gi / Intermediate / Master 2 (36+) ====
Weight	Gold	Silver	Bronze
Open	(United States) Jonathan Fisher	(Switzerland) Marco Kuster	(Thailand) Sarun Satawin

==== Male Absolute No-Gi / Advanced / Adult ====
Weight	Gold	Silver	Bronze
Open	(United States) De'Alonzio Jackson	(Australia) Campbell Symes	(Canada) Demitri Telfair
Open	(United States) De'Alonzio Jackson	(Australia) Campbell Symes	(United States) Daniel Larman

=== List of women champions ===
==== Female Gi / White / Adult ====
Weight	Gold	Silver	Bronze
-48.5 kg	(Singapore) Calista Lee	(Singapore) Kimberly Cordeiro	(Taiwan) Jengru Juang
-53.5 kg	(Singapore) Nadiah Lim	(Singapore) Huay Cheng Ng	(Singapore) Eve Ng
-58.5 kg	(Russia) Dilshoda Umarova	(Spain) Ana Calleja Moral	(Singapore) Alison Ang
-64 kg	(Russia) Ilvira Musifullina	(United States) Sade Stanley	(Thailand) Isara Tanadumrongsak
-64 kg	(Russia) Ilvira Musifullina	(United States) Sade Stanley	(Thailand) Jennifer Yansucon

==== Female Gi / White / Master 1 (30+) ====
Weight	Gold	Silver	Bronze
-53.5 kg	(Singapore) Ng Huay Cheng	(Thailand) Shyanin Nakeesathit	(Singapore) Carol Widjaya
-53.5 kg	(Singapore) Ng Huay Cheng	(Thailand) Shyanin Nakeesathit	(Singapore) Calista Lee
-58.5 kg	(China) Ding Miao	(Thailand) Chomchanok Visuddhidham	(Singapore) Faradila Prameshwari
-58.5 kg	(China) Ding Miao	(Thailand) Chomchanok Visuddhidham	(Singapore) Jessica Koh
-64 kg	(Singapore) Alison Ang	(Singapore) Dwi Jayanti	(Singapore) Alison Ang

==== Female Gi / Blue / Adult ====
Weight	Gold	Silver	Bronze
-53.5 kg	(Japan) Ayano Kurokawa	(Singapore) WanJia Sng	(Indonesia) Desyana Gemina
-53.5 kg	(Japan) Ayano Kurokawa	(Singapore) WanJia Sng	(Thailand) Vilayvanh Sengsouvanh
-58.5 kg	(Malaysia) Ardeena Wan	(Singapore) Elaine Chua	(South Korea) Bohyun Kim
-58.5 kg	(Malaysia) Ardeena Wan	(Singapore) Elaine Chua	(Malaysia) Lee Pei San
-69 kg	(Russia) Oksana Tsybulskaya	(Indonesia) Jacqueline Angsono	

==== Female No-Gi / Beginner / Adult ====
Weight	Gold	Silver	Bronze
-56 kg	(Russia) Dilshoda Umarova	(China) Ding Miao	(China) Jingyu Li
-61 kg	(United States) Shalini Negi	(Thailand) Jennifer Yansucon	(Indonesia) Dwi Jayanti
-61 kg	(United States) Shalini Negi	(Thailand) Jennifer Yansucon	(United States) Sade Stanley

==== Female No-Gi / Intermediate / Adult ====
Weight	Gold	Silver	Bronze
-56 kg	(Japan) Ayano Kurokawa	(Indonesia) Desyana Gemina	
-66 kg	(United Kingdom) Sarah Scott	(Malaysia) Ardeena Wan	

==== Female Absolute Gi / White / Adult ====
Weight	Gold	Silver	Bronze
Open	(Spain) Ana Calleja Moral	(Malaysia) Lisha Fauzan	(Russia) Dilshoda Umarova
Open	(Spain) Ana Calleja Moral	(Malaysia) Lisha Fauzan	(China) Ding Miao

==== Female Absolute Gi / Blue / Adult ====
Weight	Gold	Silver	Bronze
Open	(United Kingdom) Lucy Greenway	(Russia) Oksana Tsybulskaya	(Indonesia) Desyana Gemina
Open	(United Kingdom) Lucy Greenway	(Russia) Oksana Tsybulskaya	(Indonesia) Jacqueline Angsono

==== Female Absolute No-Gi / Beginner / Adult ====
Weight	Gold	Silver	Bronze
Open	(Russia) Dilshoda Umarova	(China) Ding Miao	(United States) Sade Stanley
Open	(Russia) Dilshoda Umarova	(China) Ding Miao	(United States) Shalini Negi

==== Female Absolute No-Gi / Intermediate / Adult ====
Weight	Gold	Silver	Bronze
Open	(United Kingdom) Sarah Scott	(Indonesia) Desyana Gemina	
