= Gracie family =

Family of Brazilian jiu-jitsu practitioners

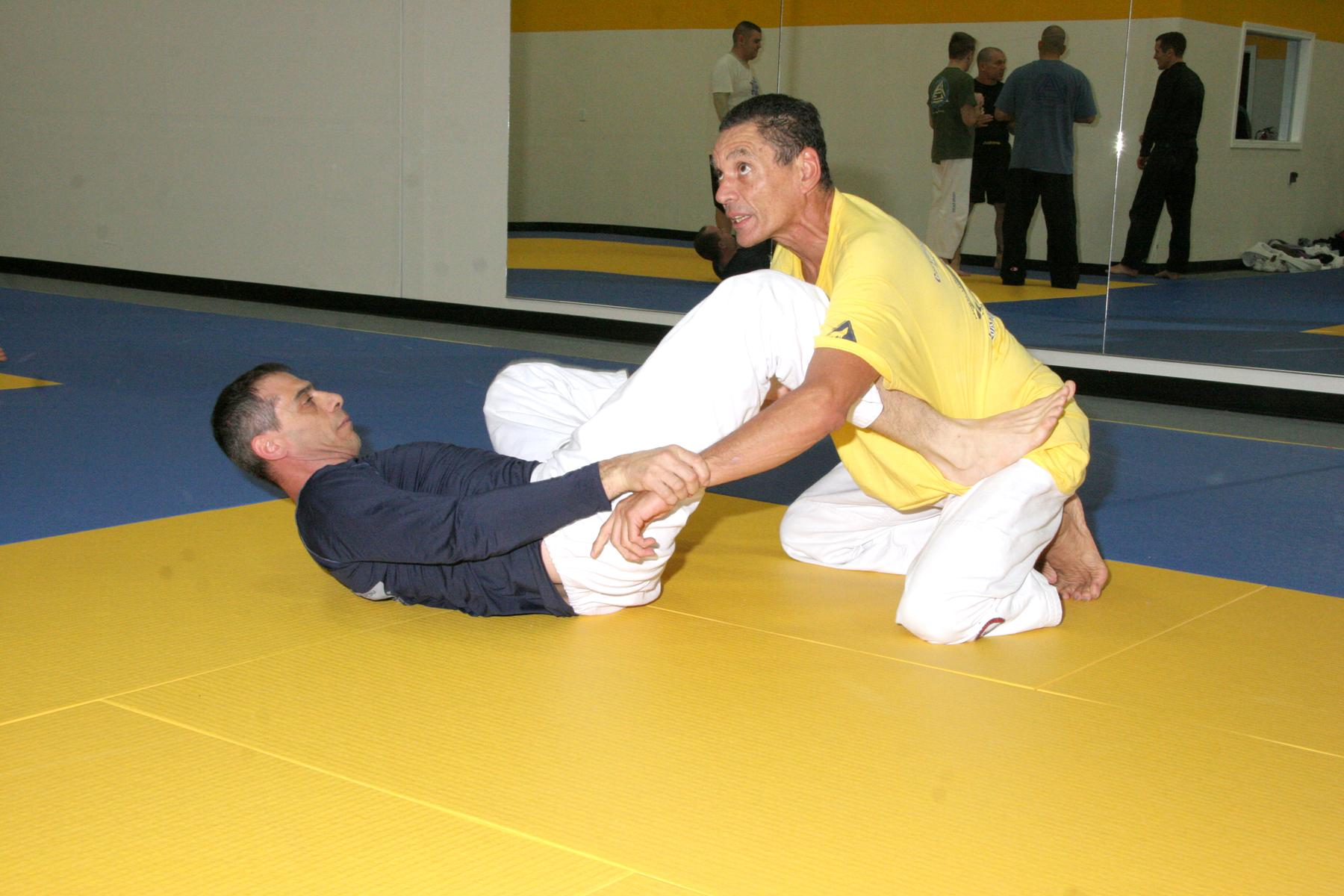
- Anibal Lobo and Relson Gracie, original Gracie family members, 1980s
- Current region: Brazil; United States
- Origin: Belém, Pará, Brazil
- Members: See below
- Connected families: Machado family
- Traditions: Brazilian jiu-jitsu; Gracie jiu-jitsu; Judo; Vale tudo Mixed martial arts

The Gracie family (Brazilian Portuguese: [ˈɡɾejsi]) is a family of martial artists originally from Belém, in Pará, Brazil, whose ancestors came from Paisley, Scotland. They are known for promoting the self-defense martial arts system of Gracie jiu-jitsu, commonly known as Brazilian jiu-jitsu, originating from Kano jiu-jitsu (Judo) brought to Brazil by judoka prizefighter Mitsuyo Maeda.

They have been successful in combat sports competitions for over 80 years, representing their self-defense system (Gracie jiu-jitsu) including mixed martial arts (MMA), vale tudo and submission wrestling events. Several members were involved in the creation of the Ultimate Fighting Championship (UFC), along with promoter Art Davie.

As a family, the Gracies upheld the "Gracie Challenge", a martial arts challenge intended to showcase the effectiveness of their style of grappling against other martial arts disciplines. Members have an affinity to, and are consanguineously related to, the Machado family.

== Jiu-jitsu ==
Gastão Gracie from Rio de Janeiro, the grandson of George Gracie through his son Pedro, married Cesarina Pessoa Vasconcellos, the daughter of a wealthy Ceará family, in 1901 and decided to settle in Belém do Pará. Gastão became a business partner of the American Circus in Belém. In 1916, the Italian Argentine Queirolo Brothers staged circus shows there and presented Mitsuyo Maeda, a Japanese judoka and prizefighter also known as Conde Koma (Count Combat). Gastão was also responsible for helping Maeda establish a Japanese community in Brazil. In 1917, Gastão's eldest son Carlos Gracie, saw a demonstration by Maeda at the da Paz Theatre,, prompting the start of his training by Maeda's apprentice Jacintho Ferro. In 1921, however, following financial hardship and his own father Pedro's demise, Gastão Gracie returned to Rio de Janeiro with his family.

Maeda's teachings were then passed on through local Rio de Janeiro coaches to Carlos and his brothers Oswaldo, Gastão Jr., George, and Hélio. There's a version saying that Hélio was too young and slow at that time to learn the art and due to his medical imposition was prohibited from physically partaking in training, but it is now known that he became a coxswain for the local rowing team as well as a competitive swimmer. A common account is Hélio learned the art of jiu-jitsu by watching his older brothers train, but due to his fragile condition instead of using pure strength Hélio learned to use leverage and positioning to defeat his opponents. Though these claims have been criticized and refuted.

For a number of years, the Gracie family ran a competitive monopoly on vale tudo events. Through their competitive rise, the men allocated power and influence with which they sought to promote Gracie family members within the vale tudo community.

With the growing popularity of grappling, members of the family have distinguished themselves in international competition. Roger Gracie won the World Jiu-Jitsu Championship 10 times in various weight divisions (6 times at 100 kg, once at 100+kg, and 3 times in the Absolute division). He also won the Pan-American Championship in the Absolute division in 2006 and the European Championships in 2005 in the 100+kg and Absolute divisions. He was also the first person to be inducted into the ADCC Hall of Fame. Kron Gracie won the ADCC Submission Wrestling World Championship in the under 77 kg division in 2013 and the European Championships in the 82 kg division in 2009. Clark Gracie won the Pan-American Championship in the under 82 kg division in 2013. Kyra Gracie was the first female member of the family to compete. She won the ADCC Submission Wrestling World Championship in the Women's under 60 kg division in 2005, 2007, and 2011 and the World Jiu-Jitsu Championship four times (three times in the Women's under 64 kg division and once in the Women's Absolute Division). She became the first woman inducted into the ADCC Hall of Fame as a result of her achievements in the sport.

== Ultimate Fighting Championship ==
In the early 1990s, Rorion Gracie collaborated with promoter Art Davie to create an eight-man single-elimination tournament for the purpose of showcasing the effectiveness of Gracie jiu-jitsu against other martial arts. The tournament would be no-holds-barred combat, much like the vale tudo matches the family had participated in for years in Brazil. The event was to be televised and would aim to publicly determine the best martial art.

The inaugural tournament took place on November 12, 1993. Rorion's younger brother Royce served as a combatant in the tournament, representing the family's martial art. Despite being the smallest competitor, Royce was able to win all three of his matches, and was crowned champion.

As more events were held, Royce would go on to win two more early UFC tournaments. His victories brought widespread attention to the family's style of jiu-jitsu, attracting many martial artists, especially in America, to begin training the art that proved so effective against the various styles showcased in the early UFC tournaments.

== Politics ==
Gracie family patriarch Hélio Gracie was a member of the Brazilian movement Integralism, which first appeared in Brazil in 1932. Former Brazilian President Jair Bolsonaro received an honorary black belt from Robson Gracie in 2018.

== Documentaries ==
A 2010 documentary film The Gracies and the Birth of Vale Tudo (Portuguese: Os Gracies e o Nascimento do Vale Tudo), directed by Victor Cesar Bota.

On July 6, 2023, it was announced that ESPN Films is producing a documentary series about the Gracie family directed by Chris Fuller and produced by Greg O'Connor and Guy Ritchie.

== Family members ==
=== Family tree ===
Gracie family tree

George
Pedro
Gastao
Carlos	Oswaldo	Gastão Jr.	George	Helena	Hélio	Mary	Ilka
Iros	Helio	Gastão	M. Helena	Liana	George	Rorion	Relson	Rickson	Rolker	Royler	Royce	Rerika	Robin	Ricci	Angela	Carla	June	Ricardo
Carlson	Robson	Geysa	Rose	Sonja	Oneica	Reyson	Reylson	Rosley	Rolange	Carley	Rocian	Carlion	Clayr	Rolls	Carlos Jr.	Karla	Crolin	Reila	Rilion	Kirla
Cesar	Rodrigo	Kron	Crosley	Clark	Jenifer	Rolles	Igor	Roger
Renzo	Ralph	Ryan	Flavia	Clara	Charles	Khonry	Kharianna	Khor	Kheydon
Marcela	Monica	Michela	Oswaldo	Ralek	Renon	Roran	Reylan	Rener	Rose	Riane	Segina	Ricon	Ryron
Kyra	Neiman	Niko

Notable members of the Gracie jiu-jitsu family include:

=== First generation ===
- Carlos Gracie Sr. (d. 1994)
- Hélio Gracie (d. 2009)

=== Second generation ===
- Carlos Gracie Jr.
- Carlson Gracie (d. 2006)
- Rickson Gracie
- Robson Gracie, also known as Carlos Robson Gracie (d. 2023)
- Rolls Gracie (d. 1982)
- Rorion Gracie
- Royce Gracie
- Royler Gracie

=== Third generation ===
- Cesar Gracie
- Clark Gracie
- Kron Gracie
- Ralph Gracie
- Renzo Gracie
- Rodrigo Gracie
- Roger Gracie
- Rolles Gracie, Jr.
- Ryan Gracie (d. 2007)
- Rener Gracie

=== Fourth generation ===
- Kyra Gracie
- Neiman Gracie

== Gallery ==
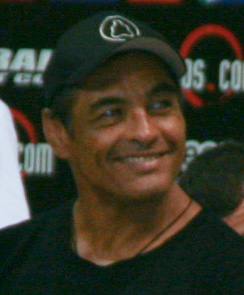
Rickson Gracie

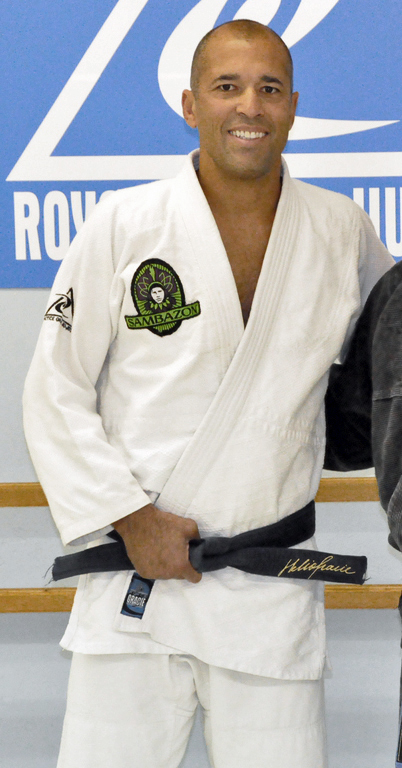
Royce Gracie

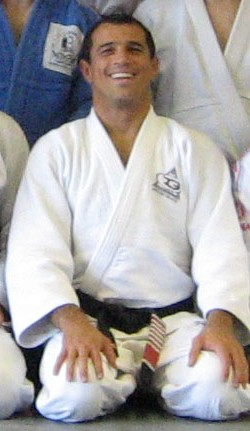
Royler Gracie

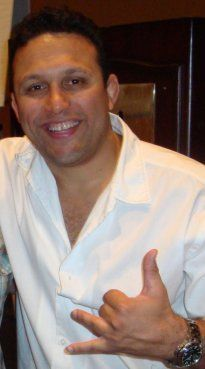
Renzo Gracie

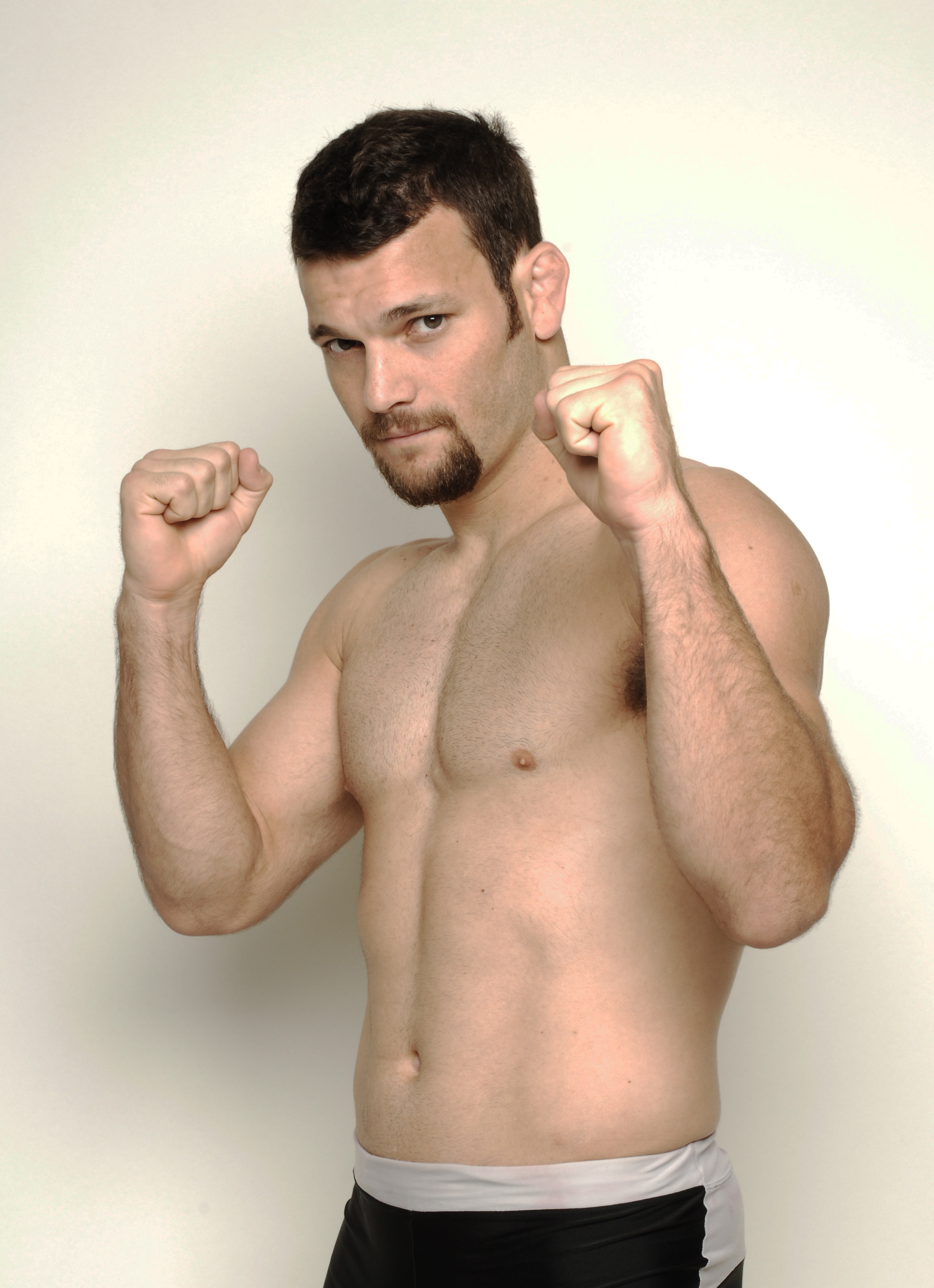
Rodrigo Gracie

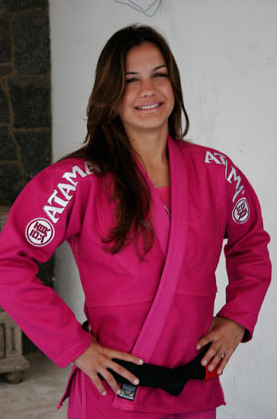
Kyra Gracie

== See also ==
- Gracie (name)
- List of Brazilian jiu-jitsu practitioners
- Gracie jiu-jitsu ranking system
