= Rener Gracie =

Brazilian-American martial artist and entrepreneur (born 1983)

- Born: November 10, 1983 (age 42); Torrance, California, U.S.
- Occupations: Brazilian Jiu-Jitsu instructor, entrepreneur
- Spouse: Eve Torres (m. 2014)
- Children: 2
- Relatives: Rorion Gracie (father) Hélio Gracie (grandfather); Ryron Gracie (brother) Ralek Gracie (brother)
- Martial arts career
- Style: Brazilian Jiu-Jitsu
- Teacher: Rorion Gracie
- Rank: 5th deg. BJJ black belt (Note: Under Hélio Gracie)

Other information
- Notable schools: Gracie University; Gracie Jiu-Jitsu Academy

Rener Gracie (born November 10, 1983) is an American-Brazilian entrepreneur, Brazilian jiu-jitsu (BJJ) black belt instructor and coach.

One of the most recognizable figures in modern Brazilian jiu-jitsu, Gracie is a coach who has helped develop top UFC competitors such as Ronda Rousey, Brian Ortega, Brendan Schaub, Javier Vazquez and Lyoto Machida as well as WWE wrestler CM Punk and pro boxer Ryan Garcia. Additionally, he has also trained celebrities including Vince Vaughn and Travis Barker.

As co-owner with his brother Ryron Gracie, and head instructor at the Gracie University of jiu-jitsu headquartered in Torrance, California, Gracie is known for his initiatives training police officers in jiu-jitsu based self-defense and his advocacy calling for a nationwide police reform. His Gracie Survival Tactics (GST) curriculum is the first to be recognized in California as approved for law enforcement.

Rener and his brother have attracted controversy since opening their school, Gracie University, for sexual harassment, abuse allegations, and predatory business practices.

An inventor and entrepreneur, Gracie founded Quikflip, a garment converting into a backpack, which was featured on ABC's Shark Tank and named as one of Time Magazine 2019 best inventions.

== Early life and education ==
Rener Gracie was born on November 10, 1983 in Torrance, California. A member of the first generation of the Gracie family born outside of Brazil, Gracie is the second eldest son of Ultimate Fighting Championship co-creator and BJJ red belt Rorion Gracie, and a grandson of Brazilian jiu-jitsu co-founder Hélio Gracie.

His introduction to jiu-jitsu came when he was still a child, learning from his father, grandfather and uncles Rickson and Royce Gracie. Gracie's father and uncles opened Gracie Jiu-jitsu Academy in Torrance in 1989, a martial art school teaching Gracie Jiu Jitsu, (Note: The term 'Brazilian Jiu Jitsu' had yet to fall into widespread usage) Gracie started helping with the coaching at the age of thirteen, becoming one of the head instructors at nineteen.

== Competitive career ==
As a brown belt, Gracie won the 2002 IBJJF American Nationals Championship. After receiving his black belt from Hélio Gracie in 2002 at the age of 19, Gracie competed in the 2003 IBJJF Pan American Jiu-Jitsu Championship winning bronze. In May 2003 he won the Southern California Pro-Am Invitational, a no-gi, no time limit tournament featuring 16 competitors, after defeating Cassio Werneck, Joe Stevenson, Tyrone Glover and Jason Miller. Even though the tournament was a no-gi grappling event, Gracie and his brother Ryron chose to fight in their gi. The match with Werneck drew particular attention due to a controversial finish, where Werneck claimed that he did not submit and video footage was reviewed in order for the referee to determine otherwise. In 2004 he retired from competition to focus on coaching and teaching.

== Gracie University ==
In 2009, Gracie and his brother Ryron launched Gracie University Online, a web BJJ learning platform. In 2024, Gracie and his brother Ryron announced the release of Gracie Combatives 2.0, an update to the course they first released 13 years earlier.

=== Coaching career ===
Gracie and his brother spent time training MMA fighter Javier Vazquez after he married their sister Rose in 2005. Gracie has also trained Lyoto Machida and his brother Chinzo Machida, as well as Carla Esparza while she was wrestling in college and Chris Holdsworth.

Gracie coached Olympic Judo medal winner Ronda Rousey in jiu-jitsu. Rousey started training with Gracie and his brother for her last two competition camps prior to UFC 168: Weidman vs. Silva 2 at the MGM Grand Garden Arena in Las Vegas in December 2013. Rousey won the fight crediting the Gracie brothers for her improvements. In anticipation for UFC 170, and the defence of her bantamweight title, Rousey trained her jiu jitsu again with Gracie during camp. In 2015 Gracie was criticized by Cris Cyborg for saying that she was being given "more credit than she deserves". Reflecting on his coaching of Rousey, Gracie said: "I've helped professional athletes of all different skills and sports and capabilities, certainly in martial arts and in jiu-jitsu in regards to combat sports, but I've never seen an athlete who hones her craft and is perfect for their sport like Ronda is for MMA."

In 2009, MMA fighter Brendan Schaub started to train Brazilian jiu-jitsu at Gracie University under Gracie and his brother, following The Ultimate Fighter: Season 10. Even though he was already a BJJ brown belt, Schaub wore a beginner's white belt for a few weeks while training no-gi. At Metamoris 2, Gracie commentated Brendan Schaub's controversial match against Roberto 'Cyborg' Abreu, alongside Ed O'Neill, while serving as one of Schaub's coaches. For UFC 165 in 2013, Gracie coached Schaub for his heavyweight bout against Matt Mitrione. In 2014 Gracie travelled to Vancouver to coach Schaub for his fight against Andrei Arlovski at UFC 174. In 2015 Schaub retired from MMA.

In 2010, Gracie started training WWE superstar CM Punk in jiu-jitsu. in 2014 he began preparing Punk to transition to MMA and make the jump from the WWE to the UFC. With Gracie acting as his mentor, Punk stated that he could not see himself "walking out without Rener". For Punk's professional debut at UFC 203 in 2016, Gracie prepared him for his fight against Mickey Gall.

Gracie has been training professional mixed martial artist Brian Ortega since his early years. Ortega enlisted at the academy at the age of thirteen learning under Gracie throughout his teenage years, and receiving his BJJ black belt and his "T-City" nickname (short for Triangle City) from him. Gracie has been cornering Ortega for most of his pro fights, only missing UFC Fight Night: Ortega vs. The Korean Zombie due to a positive Covid result, ESPN called him "Brian Ortega's most-tenured coach". Gracie joined Team Ortega on The Ultimate Fighter 29. Ortega has been ranked by the website Tapology one of the greatest MMA grapplers of all time, and as of May 2023, one of the 5 best featherweight MMA fighters.

In 2022, Gracie started training professional boxer and 2021 WBC interim lightweight title holder Ryan Garcia in Brazilian jiu-jitsu. In addition Gracie has trained a number of celebrities including Anthony Bourdain, Vince Vaughn who started in 2016 and received his purple belt in 2018, Rakaa Iriscience, Travis Barker, Prince Jackson, Billy Graziadei and Michael Clarke Duncan. Gracie has also trained actor Jeremy Piven and Hollywood stuntwoman Heidi Moneymaker.

Gracie has been a regular guest on the TV series UFC Ultimate Insider, appearing in 16 episodes between 2012 and 2016. In 2021 Gracie was featured, as Brian Ortega's jiu-jitsu coach, on Countdown to UFC (Season 15) for UFC 266 and on UFC on ABC: Ortega vs. Rodríguez in July 2022.

=== Law enforcement training ===
Gracie has been involved in teaching BJJ to law enforcement for over twenty years and for advocating a nationwide police reform across the United States that would include jiu-jitsu training. Gracie's defense program using jiu-jitsu is called Gracie Survival Tactics (GST), in 2020 the GST curriculum became the first of its kind to be approved, by The Commission on Peace Officer Standards and Training (POST) for law enforcement in California. A certification that the Gracie family had been seeking for years, since then the program has started to certify police officers and armed forces personnel. Gracie's plan for national police reform centered around BJJ was featured in August 2021 on an episode of HBO sports news program Real Sports with Bryant Gumbel.

In 2020 Gracie criticized Mayor Bill de Blasio for signing a bill into law that bans mount and knee on belly positions as well as any type of vascular restraint for police officers, calling the new police reform "A Disaster For Everyone". In 2021 the bill was retired after being struck down by the New York Supreme Court.

==== Healthcare professionals ====
Gracie announced in 2025 that he was launching ‘Gracie Medical Defense’, which would focus on techniques for healthcare professionals.

== Other ventures ==
=== Gracie Breakdown ===
In addition to running Gracie University, Gracie and his brother Ryron host the YouTube channel called: The Gracie Breakdown where they go over techniques used on the Ultimate Fighting Championship (UFC) with guests such as Ed O'Neill as well as highlighting the application of jiu jitsu in real-life situations. in 2018 The Gracie Breakdown had 355,000+ subscribers and over 200+ videos, in 2022 the channel had over 700k subscribers and more than 155 million video views.

=== Quikflip ===
Gracie is the creator of Quikflip Apparel, clothing that can be assembled into a wearable backpack, starting with designing a hoodie. Gracie presented Quikflip on Episode 23 Season 10 of the reality ABC TV series Shark Tank where it received an offer from investor Lori Greiner of $250,000 in cash and a $250,000 loan, in exchange for 10% equity. The deal with Greiner was never finalized but the appearance on Shark Tank drastically increased the sales. Quickflip was featured on Advertising Specialty Institute 2019 Hot List and named one of "The 100 Best Inventions of 2019″ by TIME Magazine.

In 2019 as the 2019 ADCC World Submission Fighting Championship took place, Gracie's invention became a best seller on Amazon, breaking sales records for both Quikflip and the e-commerce website after being featured on Amazon's Deal of the Day. In 2023 Quikflip Apparel had an annual revenue of $4 million while being valued at $3.2 million.

=== Sleeper Hold Travel Pillow ===
Gracie also invented a different take on the classic travel pillow, called the Sleeper Hold travel pillow. He launched the pillow on Kickstarter on May 3, 2023 and raised over $1 million (USD) for 17,843 backers in 30 days making it the top-funded travel pillow in crowdfunding history. On May 11, 2023, he received an invitation to appear on Shark Tank for a second time with his latest product.

=== The 32 Principles ===
Gracie released a book entitled The 32 Principles: Harnessing the Power of Jiu-Jitsu to Succeed in Business, Relationships and Life with a foreword by Jocko Willink on August 23, 2023.

=== Black belt exchange ===
Along with his brother Ryron Gracie, Rener hosts an annual 'Black Belt Exchange' at the Gracie University Headquarters in Torrance, California, that aims to bring together Jiu-jitsu black belts in order to share information and opinions on the sport.

== Personal life ==
Gracie is married to former World Wrestling Entertainment (WWE) wrestler Eve Torres, with whom he has two sons Raeven born in 2015 and Renson born in 2018.

In 2025, Gracie was the subject of sexual harassment and abuse allegations made by former employee Evandro Nunes. Nunes alleged that Rener Gracie and his older brother and business partner, Ryron Gracie, subjected him to humiliating rituals, pressured him into polyamorous relationships, and involved him in a sexual relationship with Ryron Gracie and Ryron Gracie’s wife. He further alleged that the brothers brought him to a sex party, accepted strategic cash-only payments, delayed employee compensation, and manipulated belt testing procedures to ensure that paying clients passed. Rener Gracie denied the allegations. Nunes claimed that the Gracie brothers weaponized their prestigious last name in order to pressure him into accepting unwanted behaviors. In response to the claims, he participated in a live three-hour Zoom debate with Nunes addressing the accusations.

== Testimony in injury lawsuit ==
Following catastrophic injuries suffered in 2018 by a jiu-jitsu student rendered quadriplegic, Gracie was called in at the trial to testify as an expert witness for the plaintiff. After four months of trial, the jury found the jiu-jitsu instructor at fault and awarded the student $46 million. After leaked footage of the incident was released, Gracie's involvement in the case, his opinion on whether the injury was the result of negligence or not, as well as the compensation payment he received for his testimony, attracted a lot of criticism from the BJJ community.

For his expert testimony in the injury lawsuit, Gracie received $100,000 as payment or $3000 per hour. Following the backlash Gracie shared a video explaining his role as an expert witness and his understanding of the incident. Gracie later announced that he was donating the entirety of his court case earnings to charity. On April 14, 2023, Gracie had a live discussion about the lawsuit with Tom DeBlass, a prominent figure in the BJJ community and one of his most ardent critics.

== Brazilian jiu-jitsu competitive summary ==
Championships:

- IBJJF American Nationals Champion (2002 brown)
- Southern California Pro-Am Invitational (2003 black)
- 3rd Place IBJJF Pan Championship (2003 black)

== Instructor lineage ==
Kano Jigoro → Tomita Tsunejiro → Mitsuyo "Count Koma" Maeda → Carlos Gracie → Helio Gracie → Rorion Gracie → Rener Gracie
