= Takeo Yano =

Japanese judoka

Takeo Yano (矢野 武雄), also known as Takeo Iano, was a Japanese judoka who helped in the establishment of Brazilian jiu-jitsu in Brazil.

== Biography ==
Yano was a standout in judo, learning it in Chinzei High School and the Dai Nippon Butoku Kai under the renowned Hajime Isogai. As of 1930, he held the first dan rank at Kodokan. He worked with the Ono brothers, Yasuichi and Naoichi. They taught Judo in the North of Brazil. He also taught in São Paulo and Rio de Janeiro. Along with Kazuo Yoshida in Bahia (founder of Bahia Judo), they helped to establish Brazilian jiu-jitsu.

In 1937, Yano fought Hélio Gracie to a draw. But on 1 September 1938, when facing another member of the Gracie family, and the best fighter of the family, George Gracie, Yano lost through a leglock. As a fighter he took on the name ″Oriental Demon″. In 1958,he also fought Waldemar Santana in a vale tudo match and lost by armlock after 38 minutes. His earlier black belts included Jose Jurandir Moura whom he taught in Fortaleza, Brazil, Cisando Lima, and Francisco Sá.

Yano is thought to have introduced the heel hook in Brazilian jiu-jitsu.
