= Clark Gracie =

2013 Pan-American Jiu-Jitsu Champion

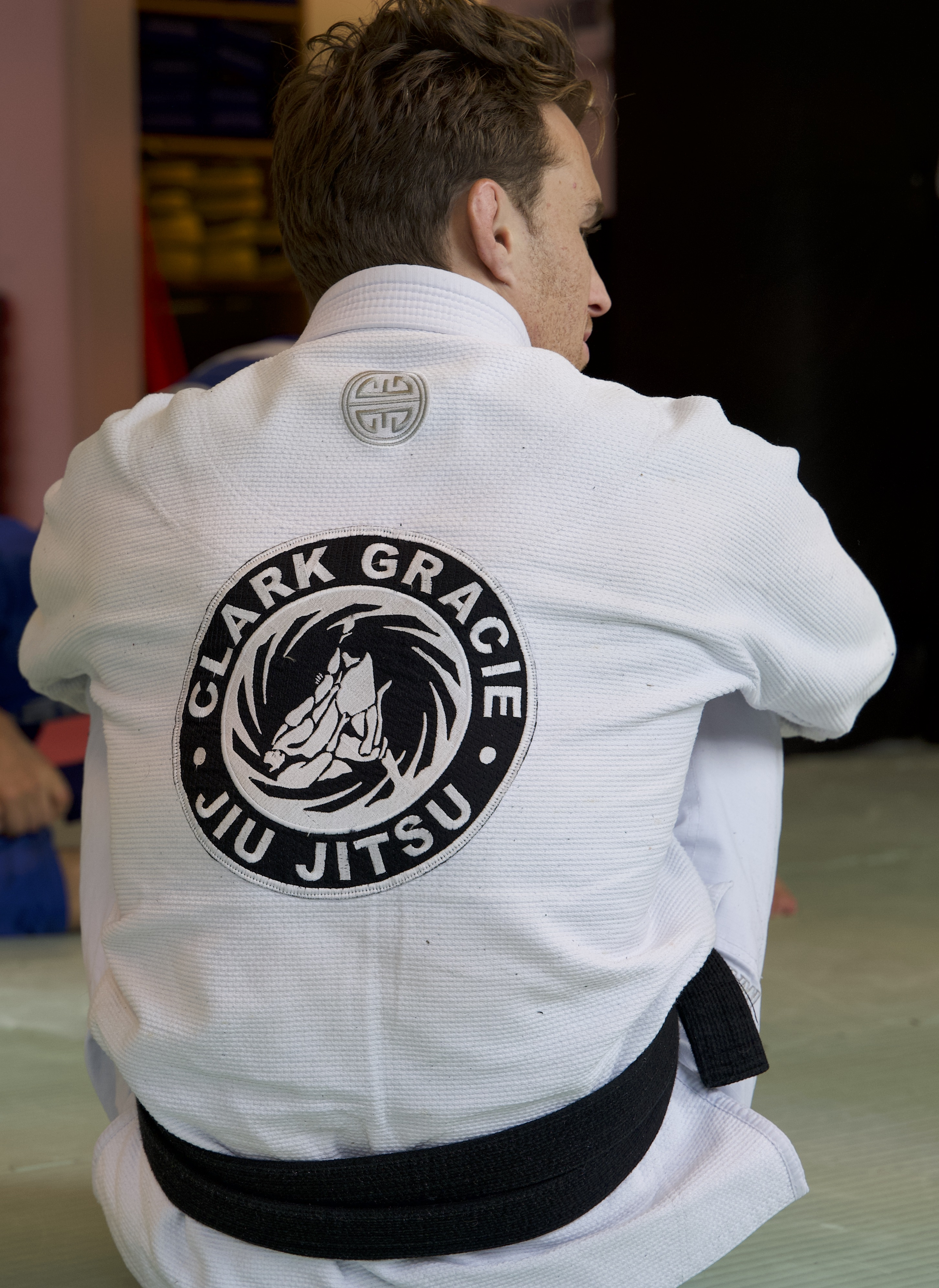
- Born: July 17, 1984 (age 42); San Francisco, California, U.S.
- Nationality: American; Brazilian
- Fighting out of: San Diego, California, United States
- Rank: 3rd degree black belt in Brazilian Jiu-Jitsu under Carley Gracie

Other information
- Website: http://www.clarkgracie.com

Clark Rouson Gracie (born July 17, 1984) is an American Brazilian jiu-jitsu competitor and member of the Gracie family. He is the grandson of Carlos Gracie, one of the founders of Gracie Jiu-Jitsu, and first eldest son of Carley Gracie, the father of Gracie Jiu-Jitsu in the United States.

He is a 2013 Pan American black belt champion in the middleweight division, submitting his opponent in the finals with his signature omoplata, or clarkoplata, finish. He was awarded the Submission of the year award from the World Jiu Jitsu Expo for his Pan Am 2013 final match. One of the most active current competitors from the Gracie lineage, Clark Gracie is also a 2017 World Master black belt champion in the middleweight division.

== Biography ==
Clark started practicing Brazilian Jiu-Jitsu at the age of ten at his father's academy in San Francisco, California, training with the adults as there were no kids classes at that time. At the age of 15 he accompanied his father to Rio de Janeiro, Brazil, where he remained for the next few years. He then moved back to the US to complete high school. He received his black belt in 2010 from his father, Grand Master Carley Gracie, at Rodrigo Medeiro's academy in Pacific Beach, San Diego. Clark Gracie is an active Brazilian Jiu-Jitsu competitor, and travels the world teaching while running Gracie Allegiance Jiu-Jitsu based in San Diego and La Jolla. The team name came from merging the name Clark Gracie Jiu-Jitsu with Allegiance Jiu Jitsu which is an affiliate gym based in Hastings New Zealand which also changed its name to Gracie Allegiance.

== Instructor lineage ==
Kano Jigoro → Tomita Tsunejiro → Mitsuyo "Count Koma" Maeda → Carlos Gracie, Sr. → Carley Gracie → Clark Gracie
