= Valdemar Santana =

Brazilian martial artist

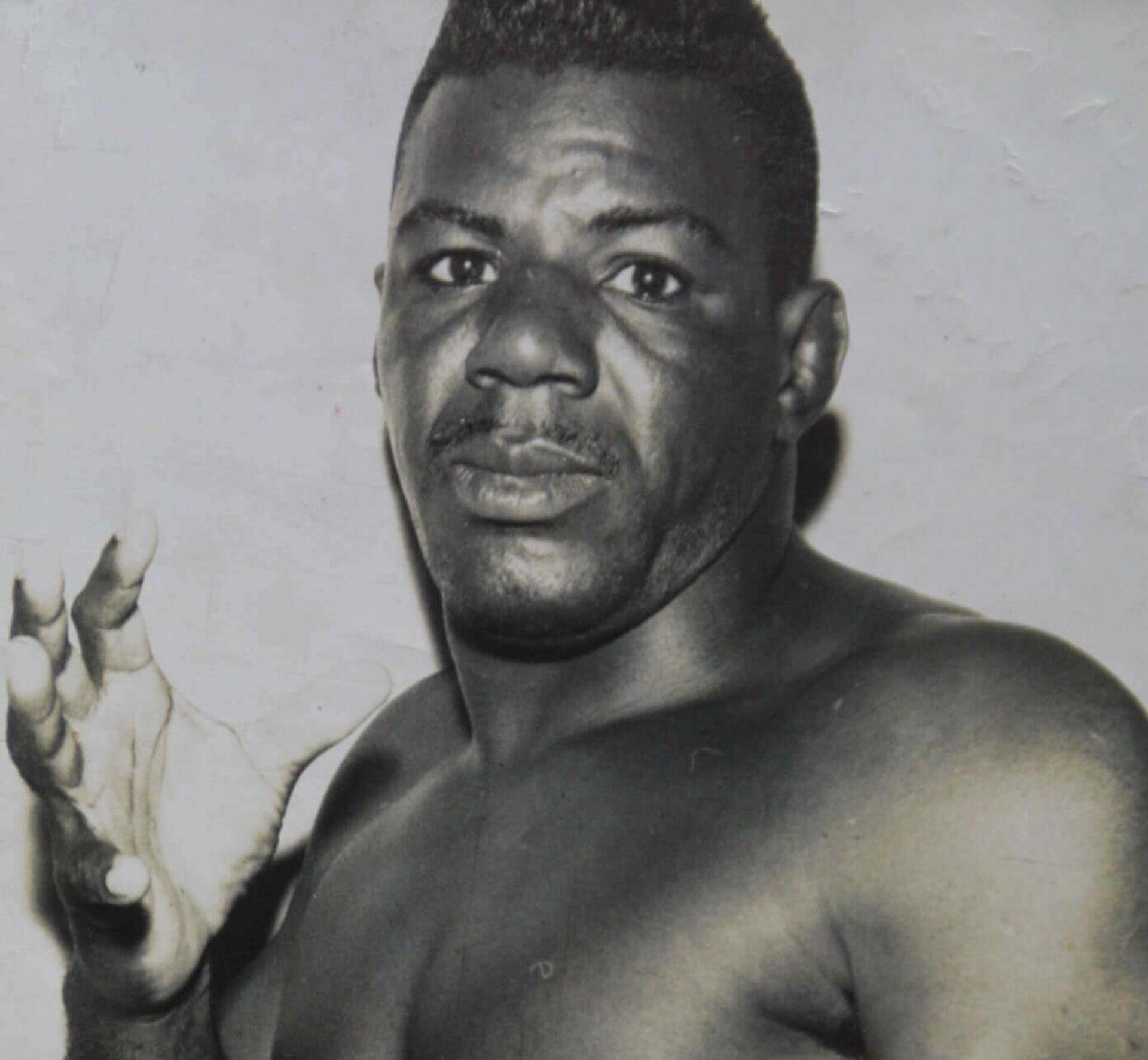
- Born: 28 October 1929; Salvador, Bahia, Brazil
- Died: 29 August 1984 (aged 54); Bahia, Brazil
- Nickname: Adema Santa; Black Leopard
- Style: Capoeira, Luta Livre, Vale Tudo, Boxing, Jiu-Jitsu
- Trainer: Hélio Gracie

Mixed martial arts record
- Total: 9
- Wins: 1
- By knockout: 1
- By submission: 0
- By decision: 0
- Losses: 5
- By knockout: 0
- By submission: 2
- By decision: 3
- Draws: 3
- No contests: 0

Valdemar Santana (born 28 October 1929 - died 29 August 1984), sometimes known as Adema Santa, was a Brazilian martial artist who trained in Capoeira under Mestre Bimba and in Brazilian Jiu Jitsu under Hélio Gracie. He was also trained in Luta Livre and boxing.

== Biography ==
He is famous for fighting his former master Hélio Gracie in 1955. Valdemar fought for the original Gracie Academy for many years but had a falling out with Hélio. Gracie and Santana decided to settle their differences in a Vale Tudo (no holds barred) match. After more than three hours and forty minutes of combat, Santana knocked out Gracie with a soccer kick to the head.

The violence of that fight would lead to the prohibition of Vale Tudo in Rio de Janeiro and merit chronicles in all newspapers in the city, including one by Nélson Rodrigues, entitled: “O preto que tinha uma alma negra”, in which the playwright analyzes the racial issue at the time. In his words:

“What happened yesterday at the ACM was an ancestral revange of the black over the white. I felt as if the blow that knocked out Hélio Gracie was delivered by the foot of Saint Benedict”.

The brutal knockout suffered by Hélio Gracie would generate an immediate interest in a response from the family, this time represented by Carlson Gracie (Hélio's nephew). Carlson would avenge his uncle Hélio in a Vale Tudo fight that filled Maracanãzinho in 1956. Carlson and Santana had, according to Carlson Gracie, had six fights, with Carlson winning two and the other four being declared a draw.

But even after being defeated by Gracie, Santana continued with his status as a sports icon. It is worth remembering that at that time Brazil was still experiencing the trauma of the Maracanazo in 1950. It was only in 1958 that the Canarian script, led by Pelé, would bring their first World Cup.

In addition to Carlson Gracie fights, Black Leopard Leopardo Negro would fight several times with other great icons of his generation, such as Ivan Gomes, Euclides Pereira, and even with the Japanese Masahiko Kimura, whom he faced in Salvador under the rules of Vale-Tudo. Kimura won the first match, and the re-match was a draw.

== Masahiko Kimura vs. Valdemar Santana ==
Masahiko Kimura went to Brazil again in 1959 to conduct his last Professional Judo/Wrestling tour. He was challenged by Valdemar Santana to a "real" (not choreographed) submission match. Santana was a champion in Gracie Jiujitsu and Capoeira. He was 27 years old, 6 feet tall, and weighed 205 lb. Kimura threw Santana with seoinage, hanegoshi, and osotogari. He then applied his famous reverse ude-garami (entangled armlock), winning the match.

Santana requested a rematch under vale tudo rules (their first fight was apparently grappling only), and, this time, the result was a draw after 40 minutes in a bout in which both competitors reportedly drew blood. Kimura fought this match despite having an injured knee; he was pressured by the promoter and police to fight against his doctor's orders.

== Career highlights ==
- 1955: Won over Hélio Gracie by KO
- 1955: Drew with Carlson Gracie
- 1956: Lost to Carlson Gracie by TKO
- 1957: Lost to Carlson Gracie by decision
- 1957: Drew with Carlson Gracie
- 1957: Drew with Carlson Gracie
- 1957: Drew with Carlson Gracie
- 1958: Won over Takeo Yano by armlock
- 1959: Lost to Masahiko Kimura by submission
- 1959: Drew with Masahiko Kimura
- 1962: Drew with Ivan Gomes
- 1968: Lost to Euclides Pereira by retirement
- 1970: Drew with Carlson Gracie
- 197?: Drew with Euclides Pereira
- 1972: Lost to Ivan Gomes by submission
