= Martial Arts History Museum =

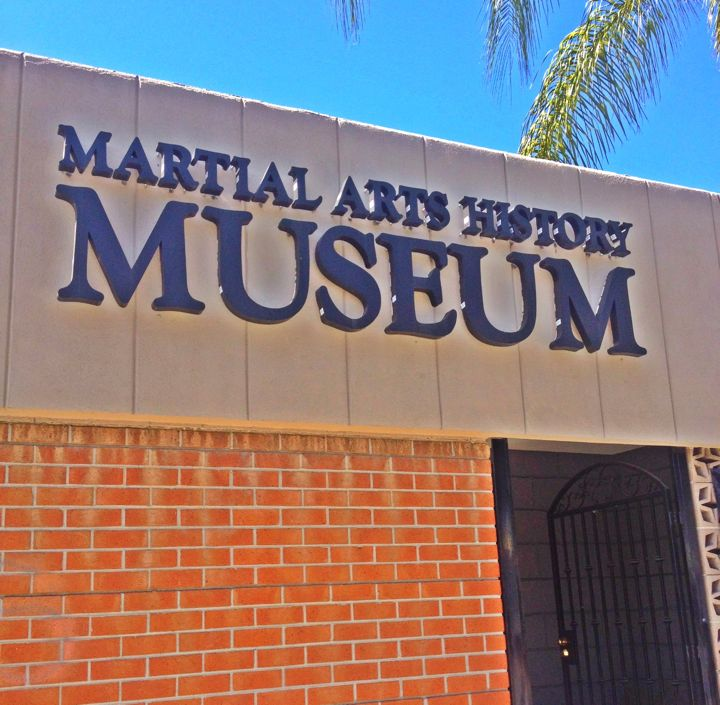
- Martial Arts History Museum

- Location within California
- Established: September 15, 1999
- Location: 201 N. Brand Blvd., B100, Glendale, CA 91203
- Coordinates: 34.148078°N 118.255046°W
- Type: History museum
- Director: Michael Matsuda
- Website: https://martialartsmuseum.com/
- Opening Hours: 11:00am-6:00pm Wednesday-Sunday

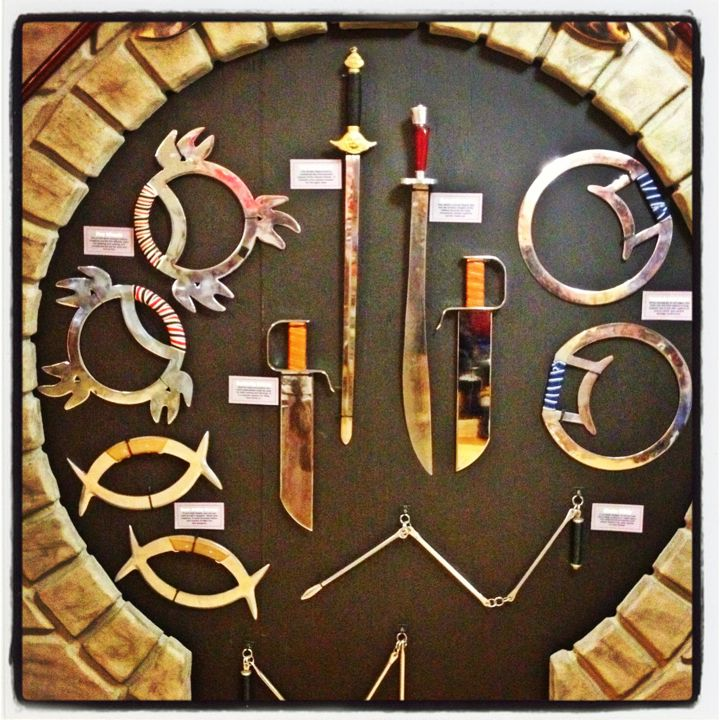
Kung Fu Weaponry at the Martial Arts History Museum

The Martial Arts History Museum is an American museum that focuses on Asian art, music, culture and history as it connects with the history of martial arts located in Glendale, California, USA. The Martial Arts History Museum is divided into several sections including China, Japan, Korea, Thailand, the Philippines, America (including Hawaii in a separate category), Anime and Media.

== History ==
The Martial Arts History Museum launched its website in 1999 and later began hosting annual Hall of Fame ceremonies. Becoming a non-profit 501(c)(3) organization, the Martial Arts History Museum took to the road as a traveling exhibit and traveled from as far south as San Diego to as far north as New Jersey. After six years of attending expos, anime festivals, martial arts tournaments, Asian shows, etc., the Martial Arts History Museum began operating out of a permanent site in Santa Clarita, California in 2006. In 2010, the Martial Arts History Museum relocated to the city of Burbank, CA and reopened its doors to the public on June 25, 2011.

The Martial Arts History Museum provides a series of annual documented historical publications that serve as a reference books for martial arts history. These include the history of the martial arts, the origin of the museum, and the Martial Arts Hall of Fame

In 2024, the museum moved to an 8,000 square foot facility in Glendale.

== Exhibits ==
The Martial Arts History Museum has exhibits covering a wide variety of martial arts and the countries from which each evolved. There are displays relating to kung fu, samurai, ninja, karate, judo, Hawaiian Lua, Filipino kali and Thailand's Muay Thai including the weaponry used in each discipline.

A Media Room displays objects of martial arts movie and television memorabilia, including the real gopher chucks used by Steve Oedekerk in the film, "Kung Pow! Enter the Fist," the headband used by Ralph Macchio in "The Karate Kid," the demon mask from "Revenge of the Ninja," the uniform from " Wendy Wu", and an animatronic character just installed. In 2015, the museum introduced their latest exhibit, The History of Anime, which includes Hong Kong Phooey.

Following the museum's move to Glendale, it added a room dedicated to the martial arts of Armenia.

== Selected objects ==
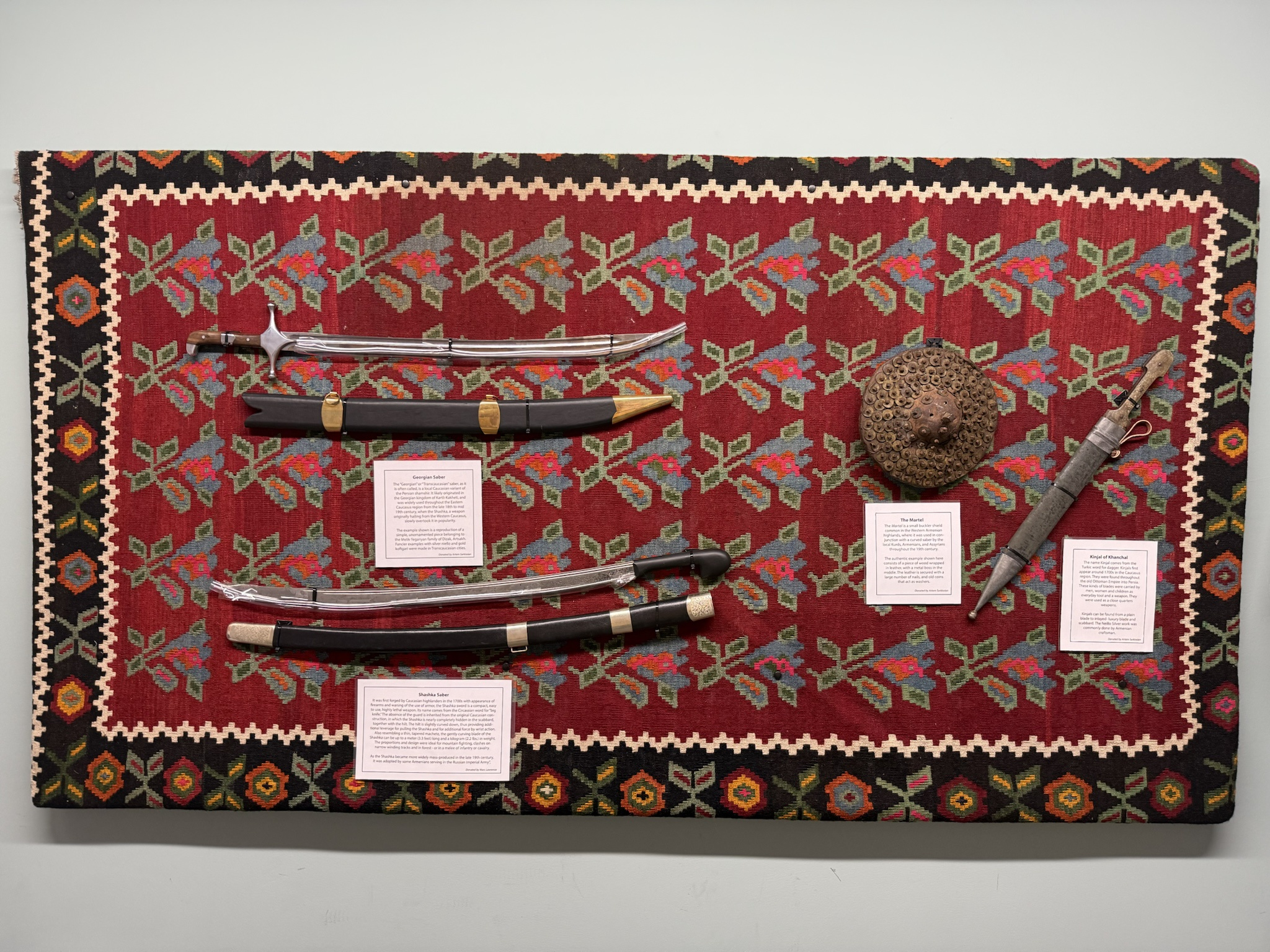
Items in the Armenia room, including a khanjali, a shamshir and a shashka
