= Soshihiro Satake =

Japanese/Brazilian martial artist

- Born: 19th century Japan
- Died: Unknown; Unknown
- Other names: Antonio Satake, Sanshiro Satake, Black Belly, Barriga Preta, Nobu Taka
- Style: Judo, jujutsu
- Teacher(s): Kanō Jigorō; Tsunejiro Tomita

Other information
- Notable students: Luiz França

Antonio Satake, born Soshihiro Satake, was a Japanese-born Brazilian martial artist and teacher. One of the teachers of Brazilian martial artist Luiz França, together with Geo Omori and Mitsuyo Maeda, Satake was one of the primary founders of Brazilian jiu-jitsu (BJJ). He pioneered judo in Brazil, the United Kingdom, and other countries.

== Biography ==
Satake started fighting as a sumo wrestler, then he joined the Kodokan dojo academy and competed in judo and jujutsu for Kanō Jigorō, the founder of judo, and for the Kodokan institute. With Mitsuyo Maeda, Satake formed the head of the second generation of Kodokan judoka, which had replaced the first by the beginning of the 20th century.

Satake, at 175 centimetres (69 in) and 80 kilograms (180 lb), was unmatched in amateur sumo but admitted that he himself was not able to match Maeda in judo. At that time, there were few graduated Kodokan judoka. Maeda and Satake were the top graduated professors at Waseda University, both sandan (3rd dan), along with Matsuhiro Ritaro (nidan or 2nd dan) and six other shodan (1st dan).

In 1903, a senior Kodokan instructor named Yamashita Yoshitsugu traveled to the United States at the request of the Seattle businessman Sam Hill. In Washington, DC, Yamashita's students included Theodore Roosevelt and other prominent Americans. At Roosevelt's request, Yamashita also taught judo at the US Naval Academy.

Capitalizing on the publicity, the Japanese Legation in the USA asked the Kodokan to send more judo teachers to America, providing continuity to Yamashita's work. Tsunejiro Tomita reluctantly accepted the task; Maeda and Satake embraced the opportunity. Tomita, Maeda, and Satake sailed from Yokohama on 16 November 1904, and arrived in New York City on 8 December 1904.

Before traveling to Europe, Maeda and Satake went to Cuba along with Akitaro Ono and Tokugoro Ito. All of them engaged in combats. On 8 February 1907, Maeda and Satake arrived in Liverpool, England. Apparently they had planned to join up with Akitaro Ono, who had gone to London to wrestle for promoter William Bankier in London music halls. During September 1909, a Japanese calling himself 'Nobu Taka' arrived in Mexico City for the purpose of challenging Maeda for what the Mexican Herald said would be the world jujutsu championship. After several months of public wrangling, Taka and Maeda met at the Colon Theater on November 16, 1909; Taka won. There was an immediate rematch, and four days later, Maeda was pronounced the champion. It was later revealed that Taka was, in fact, Soishiro Satake. During 1911, Maeda and Satake were joined in Cuba by Akitaro Ono and Tokugoro Ito. The four men were known as the "Four Kings of Cuba". The Four Kings were very popular in Cuba, and the Japanese media were proud of the reputation they were bringing to judo and Japan.

In 1913, Maeda and Satake went to El Salvador, Costa Rica, Honduras, Panama, Colombia, Ecuador and Peru. In El Salvador, the president was assassinated while they were there, and in Panama, the Americans tried to pay Maeda to lose, and, in response, they kept moving south. In Peru they met Laku, a Japanese jujutsuka who taught the military, and invited him to join them. They were then joined by Okura in Chile, and by Shimitsu in Argentina. The troupe arrived in Porto Alegre on 14 November 1914. and then moved throughout the country for a year. On 26 August 1915, Maeda, Satake, Okura, Shimitsu, and Laku were at Recife, during October 1915, they were in Belém, finally arriving in Manaus in the Brazilian state of Amazonas on 18 December 1915. Tokugoro Ito arrived some time later. On 20 December 1915, the first demonstration in Belém took place at the Theatro Politheama. The O Tempo newspaper announced the event, stating that Conde Koma would show the main jiu-jitsu techniques, excepting the prohibited ones. He would also demonstrate self-defense techniques. After that, the troupe would be accepting challenges from the crowd, and there would be the first sensational match of jiu-jitsu between Shimitsu (champion of Argentina) and Laku (Peruvian military professor).

On 22 December 1915, according to O Tempo, jiu-jitsu world champion Maeda, head of the Japanese troupe, and Satake, New York champion, performed an enthusiastic and sensational jiu-jitsu match. On the same day, Nagib Assef, an Australian Greco-Roman wrestling champion of Turkish origin, challenged Maeda.

On 8 January 1916, Maeda, Okura, and Shimitsu boarded the SS Antony and left for Liverpool. Tokugoro Ito went to Los Angeles. Satake and Laku stayed in Manaus teaching, according to O Tempo, jiu-jitsu. After 15 years together, Maeda and Satake had finally split up. Of this last trip to Europe, little is known. Maeda went from England to Portugal, Spain, and France, coming back to Brazil in 1917 alone. Satake would become the founder, in 1914, of the first historically registered judo academy in Brazil. He and Maeda are considered the pioneers of judo in Brazil. In January 1916, Satake won the first jiu-jitsu tournament in the Amazon. In Manaus Satake opened his own academy in 1916, at the Atlético Rio Negro Clube, which became the first Japanese to open a judo and jiu-jitsu academy in Brazil. Satake became a Brazilian citizen and changed his name to Antônio Soshihiro Satake. On 19 September 1921, Satake, Maeda, and Okura were briefly in New York City. They were aboard the Booth Line steamship SS Polycarp. All three men listed their occupations as professors of "juitso". After leaving New York, the three men went to the Caribbean, where they stayed from September to December 1921. In Havana, Satake and Maeda took part in some contests. Their opponents included Paul Alvarez, who wrestled as Espanol Icognito. Alvarez defeated Satake and Yako Okura—the latter being billed as a former instructor at the Chilean Naval Academy—before being himself beaten by Maeda. Maeda also defeated a Cuban boxer called Jose Ibarra, and a French wrestler called Fournier.

In 1922, Satake embarked to Europe and nothing was known about him after that.

== See also ==
- Oswaldo Fadda
