= Robson Moura =

Brazilian martial artist

- Born: March 23, 1978 (age 48); Teresópolis, Brazil
- Other names: Robinho
- Height: 5 ft 5 in (1.65 m)
- Weight: 145 lb (66 kg; 10.4 st)
- Division: Flyweight
- Fighting out of: Tampa, Florida, United States
- Team: Robson Moura
- Trainer: Ailson "Jucão" Brites André Pederneiras
- Rank: 6th deg. BJJ black belt

Mixed martial arts record
- Total: 4
- Wins: 2
- By decision: 2
- Losses: 1
- By decision: 1
- Draws: 1

Other information
- Mixed martial arts record from Sherdog
- Last updated on: 2011-02-16

Robson Moura Fonseca is a Brazilian Jiu Jitsu competitor, instructor and a mixed martial artist. He started training in Brazilian Jiu Jitsu at the age of 10 in Teresópolis, Brazil. His first Brazilian Jiu-Jitsu teacher was Ailson "Jucão" Brites, though Moura attained the rank of black belt at the age of 16 from Nova União co-founder André Pederneiras. Today Moura holds a 6th degree black belt in Brazilian Jiu-Jitsu under Professor Brites. He has a mixed martial arts record of 2-1-1.

Moura is known for his innovative style and ever-evolving technique in the world of jiu-jitsu. He won his division in the BJJ Mundials from 1996 through 2000, and again in 2007. He is recognized by the IBJJF, CBJJF & CBJJO. Having established and taught at academies in Brazil, he runs his Robson Moura Brazilian Jiu Jitsu Academy in Tampa, Florida.

In addition to his position as Head Instructor at RMNU Headquarters in Tampa, Florida, Moura directs additional academies in Brazil that are run by his black belt instructors. Moura travels frequently across the country sharing his knowledge and experience with other jiu jitsu players. In 2008, he established the Robson Moura Association, with over 45 affiliates around the world. He continues to compete, recently winning his division at the Rickson Gracie Invitational, and competing at Polaris and the Abu Dhabi World Pro in 2016.

== Professional grappling career ==
Moura competed at Polaris 21 on September 21, 2022 in a gi superfight against Tom Barlow. Moura won the match by unanimous decision.

== Mixed martial arts record ==
Professional record breakdown
4 matches	2 wins	1 loss
By decision	2	1
Draws	1	

Res.	Record	Opponent	Method	Event	Date	Round	Time	Location	Notes
Draw	2-1-1	Mamoru Yamaguchi	Draw	Shooto: 9/26 in Kourakuen Hall	September 26, 2004	3	5:00	Tokyo, Japan	
Win	2-1	Junji Ikoma	Decision (unanimous)	Shooto - Year End Show 2003	December 14, 2003	3	5:00	Tokyo, Japan	
Loss	1-1	Yasuhiro Urushitani	Decision (split)	Shooto - 5/4 in Korakuen Hall	May 4, 2003	3	5:00	Tokyo, Japan	
Win	1-0	Mamoru Yamaguchi	Decision (unanimous)	Shooto: Treasure Hunt 10	September 16, 2002	3	5:00	Tokyo, Japan	

== See also ==
- List of Brazilian Jiu-Jitsu practitioners
