= Sanpo Toku =

Japanese judoka (1887–1945)

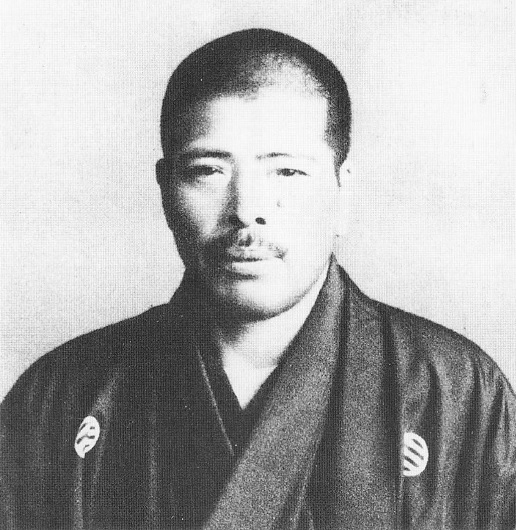
- Born: Toku Sanpo; December 12, 1887; Amagi, Kagoshima Prefecture, Japan (Tokunoshima (Island))
- Died: March 10, 1945 (aged 57)
- Native name: 徳 三宝
- Style: Judo
- Teachers: Jigoro Kano; Kaichiro Samura; Tokugoro Ito
- Rank: Judo: 9th Dan

Sanpo Toku (徳 三宝, Toku Sanpō; December 12, 1887 – March 10, 1945) was a Japanese judoka.

== Biography ==
Toku was born in Kagoshima Prefecture, Japan in 1887. He started training in judo, karate and kendo at elementary school, becoming a frequent tournament winner; in one of his first showings, he defeated 165 opponents in a single judo league. It was said he refused to learn ukemiwaza on the saying he would never be thrown.

After being scouted by Kaichiro Samura, he moved to Tokyo and joined the Kodokan school in May 1906. He soon became known there for his harsh training regime, which gained him the nickname of "Nonaka no Ipponsugi" (野中の一本杉, "The Lone Cypress in the Field") and the reputation of being the strongest judoka of his time. He was one of the school's biggest names along with future 10th dan Shotaro Tabata and Kyuzo Mifune, the latter prompting a public rivalry in which they were known as "Waza no Mifune" (技の三船, "Mifune of the Technique") and "Oni no Toku" (鬼の徳, "Toku of the Devilness").

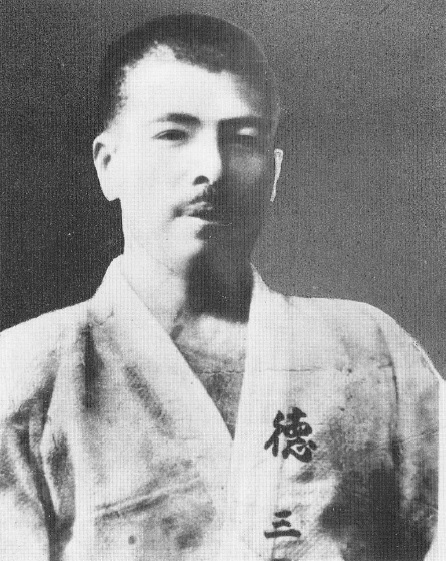
Toku in 1915.

Toku famously challenged karate master and Shotokan founder Gichin Funakoshi to a match, without ever receiving an answer. Toku himself did, however, answer to a challenge made by 15 sailors of the Brazilian Navy to the Kodokan in 1912, defeating them all soundly and injuring several of them. This would temporarily end Toku's career in the Kodokan, as the Brazilian embassy lodged a formal complaint which forced Jigoro Kano to expel Toku from the school. Kano still offered to maintain him economically, though Toku refused, choosing to become a wandering martial arts teacher instead.

There are several anecdotes of Toku's freelance period. According to some sources, around this time he lost a dojoyaburi match against the leader of the Kashima Shin-ryū jujutsu school, Zenya Kunii, who was reportedly undefeated through his life. Admired by the ease Kunii had thrown him multiple times with, Toku trained briefly under him. It is also said Toku enlisted in the Japanese military for a time before being discharged by health reasons, not without featuring an incident where he knocked out a stallion for kicking him. Afterwards, being rejected from teaching in the Dai Nippon Butoku Kai due to the Kodokan's influence, he performed the Shikoku Pilgrimage, where he trained with empoverished martial artists like him. This time of his life ended in 1917 when Toku was pardoned by Kano and reinstated as a Kodokan teacher, immediately taking Iwazo Hayashi as his pupil.

At 40 years old and 6th dan, Toku became a usual participant of the predecessor league to the modern All-Japan Judo Championships. Although he suffered a hard defeat by yoko shiho gatame to Torao Uto in 1930, he reached the league's third place in 1932. After these competitions, he passed the rest of his career teaching at the Waseda, Nippon and Takushoku Universities. He also founded his own dojo and taught other future martial arts masters like Minoru Mochizuki, Kori Hisataka and Kenichi Sawai. During World War II, Toku was killed in a Tokyo air raid in 1945.

A statue of Toku was later erected in the Amagi High School. He would be described by training partner and Brazilian jiu-jitsu influencer Geo Omori as the best of his time, calling him the "star of stars."
