= Ailson Brites =

Brazilian martial artist

Ailson Henrique Brites
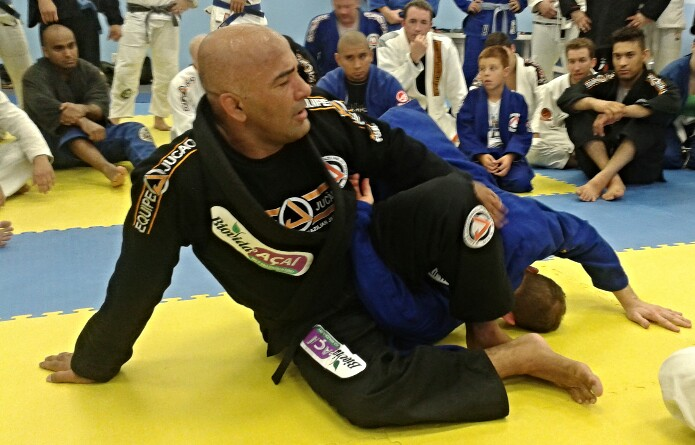
- Brites demonstrating an Omoplata Variation (2014)
- Born: December 6, 1965 (age 60); Teresópolis, Brazil
- Other names: "Jucão"
- Division: Heavy
- Style: Brazilian jiu-jitsu
- Team: Equipe Jucão USA
- Rank: 7th degree coral belt in Brazilian jiu-jitsu

Other information
- Occupation: Instructor
- Notable school: Equipe Jucão USA
- Website: www.teamjucao.com
- Last updated on: 3 October 2010

Ailson Henrique Brites (also known as "Jucão" (Portuguese pronunciation: [ʒuˈkɐ̃w]); born December 6, 1965) is a Brazilian jiu-jitsu expert and World Champion 7th degree coral belt under Carlos Gracie Jr.

== Biography ==
Multiple time World Champion, Master Ailson “Jucão” Henrique Brites began practicing Brazilian jiu-jitsu at the age of 10. His uncle, Amilton Brites, a long-time practitioner of Brazilian jiu-jitsu, brought both Jucão and his brother, Admilson "Juquinha" Brites, to the Academia Serrana in Teresópolis. Jucão's first teachers were his other uncle, grandmaster Geny Rebello, Rebello's son Professor Cirillo Azevedo, and Professor Elias Martins.

While still in high school, Jucão was introduced to the Machado brothers, who were already well known for their Jiu-Jitsu. After 11 years of training at the Academia Serrana, Carlos Machado invited Jucão to train under Carlos Gracie Jr. at his famous academy Gracie Barra. After several more years there, Jucão received his black belt from Carlos Gracie Jr. on January 23, 1993.

In August 1995, Jucão's uncle Grandmaster Armando Wriedt, invited him to move to Brasília. Jucão began teaching classes there at the Academia Dalmo Ribeiro.

In his nearly 40 years of training and teaching, Jucão has formed many internationally recognized athletes, both as champions and professors of Brazilian jiu-jitsu. As a competitor, he has fought in over 1000 Jiu-Jitsu matches and won many championships.

Jucão founded his US school in 2008 Equipe Jucão USA in New York City and it has been growing ever since. Jucão also spends his time teaching at the Team Jucao Brazilian Jiu-Jitsu school in Berkeley Heights, New Jersey. He also regularly teaches at Storming Mountain Academy in White Plains, New York and Ronin Jiu-Jitsu Academy, Fight and Fitness MMA Garwood NJ, and Battle Ground MMA in New Jersey.

== Instructor lineage ==
Carlos Gracie, Sr. → Helio Gracie→ Carlos Gracie Jr. → Ailson “Jucão” Henrique Brites

== Grappling credentials ==
- 2015 1st Place Pan Jiu-Jitsu Championship 2014 in Open Master 4 division
- 2014 1st Place Pan Jiu-Jitsu Championship 2014 in Super Heavy Master 4 division
- 2014 1st Place Pan Jiu-Jitsu Championship 2014 in Open Master 4 division
- 2014 1st Place European Open Jiu-Jitsu Championship 2014 in Heavy Master 4 division
- 2014 1st Place European Open Jiu-Jitsu Championship 2014 in Open Master 4 division
- 2013 1st Place World Jiu-Jitsu Championship – Master and Seniors 2013 in Heavy Seniors 3 division
- 2013 1st/2nd Place World Jiu-Jitsu Championship – Master and Seniors 2013 in Open Seniors 3 division ♦Jucao bows out to younger brother Admilson "Juquinha" Brites, who graciously accepts the victory as these incredibly talented BJJ brothers once again meet in the finals of a major tournament
- 2013 1st Place Pan Jiu-Jitsu No-Gi Championship 2013 in Heavy Seniors 3 division
- 2013 1st/2nd Place Pan Jiu-Jitsu No-Gi Championship 2013 in Heavy Seniors 3 division ♦Jucao bows out to younger brother Admilson "Juquinha" Brites, who graciously accepts the victory
- 2012 1st Place European No Gi Open Jiu-Jitsu Championship in Super Heavy Seniors 3 division
- 2012 1st Place European No Gi Open Jiu-Jitsu Championship in Open Seniors 3 division
- 2012 1st Place London International Open IBJJF Championship in Super Heavy Seniors 3 division
- 2012 1st Place London International Open IBJJF Championship in Open Seniors 3 division
- 2012 1st Place Pan Jiu-Jitsu No-Gi Championship in Super Heavy Seniors 3 division
- 2012 1st Place Pan Jiu-Jitsu No-Gi Championship in Open Seniors 3 division
- 2012 1st Place European Open Jiu-Jitsu Championship in Open Seniors 3 division
- 2012 2nd Place European Open Jiu-Jitsu Championship in Heavy Seniors 3 division
- 2010 3rd Place Pan Jiu-Jitsu No-Gi Championship in Super Heavy and Open Seniors 2 divisions
- 2009 1st Place New York Open Champion in Super Heavy and Open divisions
- 2008 1st Place Pan No-Gi Champion in Heavy and Open divisions
- 2008 1st Place Pan Champion in Heavy and Open divisions
- 2008 1st Place NAGA World Champion
- 2004 1st Place European Open Champion in Heavy and Open divisions
- Brazilian National Championship

2004 1st Place in Senior 1 Heavy Division, 1st Place in Senior 1 Open divisions
1999 1st Place in Master Heavy Division, 1st Place in Master Open division

- International Master and Senior Championship

2004 1st Place in Senior 1 Heavy division
2003 1st Place in Senior 1 Open division
2002 1st Place in Senior 1 Open division, 3rd Place in Senior 1 Heavy division
2001 1st Place in Senior 1 Heavy division, 3rd Place in Senior 1 Open division

- 3x Mundials Championship Bronze Medalist

== DVDs and videos ==
Sweeps & Submissions DVD by Ailson "Jucao" Brites #12221 (budovideos.com)

== See also ==
- List of Brazilian jiu-jitsu practitioners
