= Luiz França =

Brazilian martial artist (1910–1982)

- Born: 2 June 1910; Manaus, Brazil
- Died: 1982 (aged 71–72)
- Other names: Luiz França Filho
- Style: Brazilian jiu-jitsu, Judo
- Teachers: Mitsuyo Maeda, Soshihiro Satake, Geo Omori
- Rank: 10th deg. BJJ red belt (Grandmaster)

Other information
- Notable students: Oswaldo Fadda

Luiz França Filho (1910–1982) was a Brazilian martial artist and one of the primary founders of a non-Gracie lineage of Brazilian jiu-jitsu (BJJ). França learned from Soshihiro Satake, Geo Omori, and Mitsuyo Maeda, three Japanese who had immigrated to Brazil and from whom he learned Kodokan judo. This assertion is disputed by some.

== Biography ==
Luiz França Filho was born on 2 June 1910 in Manaus, Brazil.

França began learning martial art from Soshihiro Satake at his academy in at the Rio Negro Athletic club, the first jiu-jitsu/judo school ran by a Japanese in Brazil, located in Manaus. França would remain in Manaus for a year, before moving to the city of Belém.

In Belém, França began training under Mitsuyo Maeda a friend and training partner of Satake, at the same time as Carlos Gracie. França then moved to São Paulo to continue his training under another Japanese judoka called Geo Omori (He later fought a grappling match against Carlos Gracie that ended in a draw).

França then moved outside Rio de Janeiro, where he taught police officers, soldiers, and the favela's poor. One of his student, Oswaldo Fadda, a young Marine, carried on França's mission of teaching jiu-jitsu to the impoverished population. Around 1942 he promoted Fadda to black belt.

== Influence ==
França’s style of BJJ can be found today in teams such as Nova União and GFTeam. According to Robert Drysdale there is no evidence that proves that França learned and trained under those Japanese masters.
