= Geny Rebello =

Brazilian martial artist (born 1927)

- Born: 1927 (age 98–99); Teresópolis, Brazil
- Other names: Geny Rebello de Azevedo
- Nationality: (Brazil) Brazilian
- Style: Brazilian Jiu-Jitsu
- Rank: 9th deg. BJJ red belt

Other information
- Occupation: Instructor
- Notable students: Ailson "Jucão" Brites
- Notable schools: Academia Serrana, Clube de Jiu-Jitsu Pitbull
- Last updated on: 14 October 2010

Geny Rebello (born 1927) is a grandmaster of Brazilian Jiu-Jitsu holding a 9th degree red belt. In 1997, Jiu-Jitsu Federation of Rio de Janeiro held a tournament named Copa 70 anos Mestre Geny Rebello in commemoration of his 70th anniversary.

== See also ==
- List of Brazilian Jiu-Jitsu practitioners
