= Oswaldo Fadda =

Brazilian martial artist (1920–2005)

Oswaldo Baptista Fadda
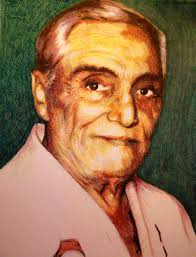
- Born: August 1, 1920; Bento Ribeiro, Rio de Janeiro, Brazil
- Died: April 1, 2005 (aged 84); Bento Ribeiro, Rio de Janeiro, Brazil; Bacterial pneumonia
- Other names: Mestre Fadda
- Style: Brazilian Jiu-Jitsu, Judo, jujutsu
- Team: Academia Fadda
- Teacher: Luiz França
- Rank: 10th deg. BJJ red belt (Grandmaster)
- Years active: 1937 – early 2000s

Oswaldo Baptista Fadda (August 1, 1920 – April 1, 2005) was a practitioner and developer of Brazilian jiu-jitsu, reaching the rank of "nono grau", a 9th degree red belt. In 2014, he was posthumously awarded the 10th degree ("décimo grau"). He is known for being one of the highest ranked non-Gracie black belts and also for teaching students from the poorer areas of Rio de Janeiro, where Brazilian jiu-jitsu was regarded as an upper-class sport. Fadda's lineage, the most prominent second to the Carlos Gracie lineage, still survives through his links with today's teams such as Nova União, Grappling Fight Team, as well as Deo Jiu-Jitsu (Deoclecio Paulo) and Equipe Mestre Wilson Jiu-Jitsu (Wilson Pereira Mattos).

== Biography ==
=== Early life ===
Fadda was born in Bento Ribeiro, a suburb in the north of Rio de Janeiro to a family of immigrants from Ardauli, Sardinia. At the age of seventeen, while in the Brazilian Marines, he began to study jiu jitsu under Luiz França, a black belt under Mitsuyo Maeda. Maeda was an expert judōka with direct lineage to the founder of judo, Kanō Jigorō, who had travelled around the world as a prize fighter while also teaching the locals his self-defence techniques. After settling in Belém in 1917, Maeda had continued to teach Judo to a select group of students (including França and Carlos Gracie).

By 1942, Gracie Jiu-Jitsu was becoming well known in Brazil, although the price of tuition was too high for most residents of Rio. Fadda had received his own black belt from França and soon started teaching jiu jitsu free of charge in unorthodox locations such as public parks and beaches, often without the aid of crash mats, aiming to spread the art of jiu-jitsu to the poorer folk. Fadda also saw jiu-jitsu as a way to help people with physical or mental disabilities, especially the city's numerous polio victims. With no real income from his teaching he was forced to advertise in the obituary section of the local newspaper.

Despite being regarded by the Gracie family as an outcast, Fadda managed to open his own academy on the outskirts of Rio on January 27, 1950. He and his students began specialising in the use of footlocks, an often ignored part of the jiu-jitsu curriculum.

=== Challenge to the Gracie school ===
In 1955, Fadda felt confident that his school was ready for the next step and issued a challenge to the Gracies through the media: "We wish to challenge the Gracies, we respect them as the formidable adversaries they are but we do not fear them. We have 20 pupils ready for the challenge".

Hélio Gracie accepted the challenge and the two teams fought at Gracie's academy. What transpired at the challenge, however, is a cause of dissension among sources. According to a newspaper, 14 fights took place, with 7 wins for Gracie's academy, 4 draws and 3 wins for Fadda's academy. According to other sources, among them Reila Gracie's biography of Carlos Gracie, Fadda's team emerged victorious, making good use of their knowledge of footlocks in which the opposition was lacking. Also, José Guimarães, one of Fadda's pupils, choked Gracie's "Leonidas" unconscious.

=== Second challenge to the Gracie school ===
The next year, at the low card of the event which hosted one of the matches between Valdemar Santana and Carlson Gracie, the two schools competed again against each other. This time, the Gracie students were wary of their footlock expertise, shouting derisively "sapateiro!" ("shoemaker!") whenever a Fadda student tried one of their foot techniques. Nonetheless, the Fadda academy won the contest without controversy. After the challenge, Fadda said an interview for the Revista do Esporte: "We put an end to the Gracie taboo".

=== Later life, death and legacy ===
Oswaldo Fadda attained the rank of 9th degree red belt. Ever humble, he lived out the rest of his life in his Bento Ribeiro suburban home, suffering from Alzheimer's disease in his later years. He died of complications brought on by pneumonia on April 1, 2005, at the age of 84.

On September 20, 2014, he was posthumously awarded the 10th degree red belt, a feat for a non-Gracie lineage.

== The Fadda family ==
After immigrating from Ardauli, Sardinia to Minas Gerais, Brazil, Oswaldo's father, Battista Fadda, Brazilianized his name to João Baptista Fadda; and added the "Baptista Fadda" to all his children's names.

Oswaldo Fadda's brother, Humberto Baptista Fadda, was also a jiu-jitsu instructor and ran the Cascadura branch of the Academia Fadda.

The Fadda family is represented in today's jiu-jitsu by Master Hélio Fadda (son of Humberto Fadda). In 2009, an event was held in Paracambi in honour of Hélio Fadda.

== Lineage ==
Mitsuyo Maeda → Luiz França → Oswaldo Fadda

== See also ==
- List of Brazilian jiu-jitsu practitioners
