= Brazilian jiu-jitsu =

Martial art

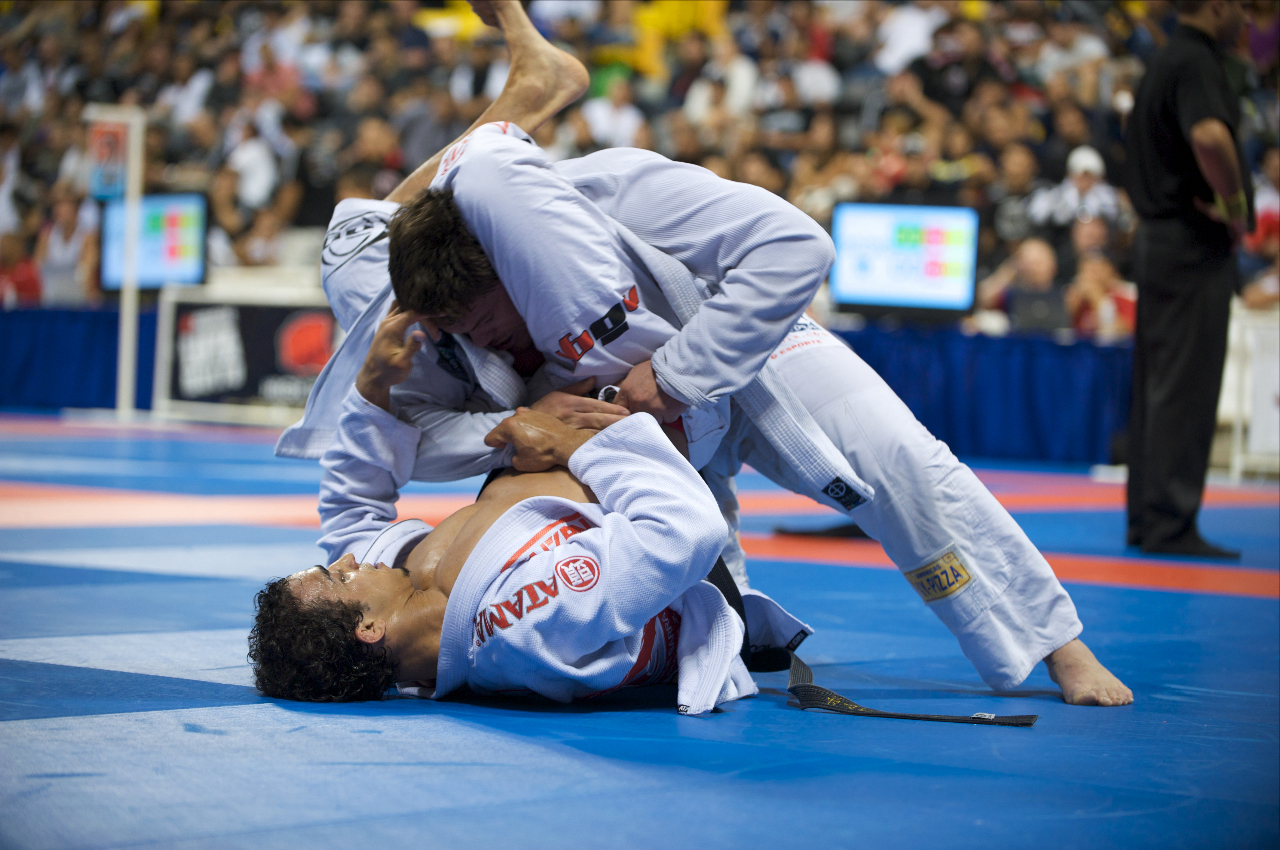
- Romulo Barral attempting a triangle choke on Gabriel Vella at the 2009 World Jiu-Jitsu Championship
- Also known as: BJJ, Gracie jiu-jitsu, gi jiu-jitsu, no-gi jiu-jitsu, submission grappling Portuguese name: Jiu-jitsu brasileiro Japanese name: Gureishī jūjutsu (グレイシー柔術)
- Focus: Ground fighting, grappling
- Hardness: Full contact
- Country of origin: Brazil
- Creator: Senjuro Kataoka (Kanaya), Mataemon Tanabe, Taro Miyake, Yukio Tani, Sada Miyako, Geo Omori, Mitsuyo Maeda, Takeo Yano, Soshihiro Satake, Tokugoro Ito, Jacyntho Ferro, Donato Pires dos Reis, Hélio Gracie, Carlos Gracie, George Gracie, Oswaldo Gracie, Luiz França, Oswaldo Fadda
- Famous practitioners: See full list
- Parenthood: Jujutsu, Kodokan judo, Catch wrestling
- Descendant arts: Submission wrestling, 10th planet jiu-jitsu

Brazilian jiu-jitsu (Portuguese: jiu-jitsu brasileiro [ʒiw ˈʒitsu bɾaziˈlejɾu, ʒu -]), commonly abbreviated as BJJ, is a self-defense system, martial art, and combat sport based on grappling, ground fighting, and submission holds. It is primarily a ground-based fighting style and involves taking one's opponent down to the ground, gaining a dominant position, and then using a number of techniques to force them into submission such as joint locks, chokeholds, or compression locks.

Brazilian jiu-jitsu was first developed by the Brazilian brothers Carlos, Oswaldo, Gastão Jr., and Hélio Gracie around 1925, after Carlos was taught judo in 1917 by either Mitsuyo Maeda, a travelling Japanese judoka, or one of Maeda's students Jacyntho Ferro. Later, the Gracie family developed their own self-defense system that they named Gracie jiu-jitsu. BJJ eventually became a distinct combat sport of its own through innovations and practices, and is considered essential for modern mixed martial arts.

Brazilian jiu-jitsu is based on the concept that a smaller, weaker person can successfully defend against a bigger, stronger opponent by using leverage and weight distribution. The focus is on taking the fight to the ground and using a number of holds and submissions to defeat them. Sparring, commonly referred to as "rolling" within the BJJ community, and live drilling play a significant role in training. In contrast to some other martial arts, BJJ can be practiced using a gi or without it ("no-gi"); for this purpose rash guards are used. BJJ can also be used for physical fitness, building character, or as a way of life.

== History ==
=== Origins ===
The first public demonstration of jiu-jitsu in Brazil took place in 1906 in the city of Manaus, the capital of Amazonas. In November of that year, the ship Jerome docked in Manaus, carrying two Japanese martial artists who were touring the Americas to showcase their fighting style: jiu-jitsu master Akishima Sadashi and his assistant Suiotos Ki.

After settling in the city, the two men published a challenge in the local newspapers, inviting anyone willing to face them in public matches. An improvised arena was set up at the "Coliseu Metálico Brasileiro" circus in Praça da Saudade, where on November 18, Master Akishima and his disciple Suiotos fought over a dozen local challengers—defeating all of them in less than five minutes each, in front of a large crowd. This marked the first official jiu-jitsu matches on Brazilian soil.

After several years of exhibitions at the circus, Akishima and Suiotos left Amazonas and sailed to Liverpool, England, aboard the ship Antony.

In 1908, the Brazilian Navy ship Benjamin Constant rescued a group of castaways on a Pacific island, among them a Japanese jiu-jitsu instructor Sada Miyako. He and his disciple Kakiara were allowed to stay aboard and continue the journey to Brazil. During the voyage, the two Japanese men taught jiu-jitsu techniques to the sailors.

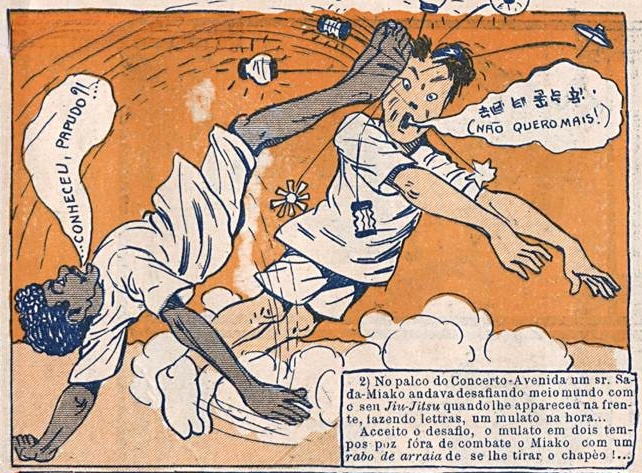
Panel by Alfredo Storni featuring capoeirista Ciríaco defeating jiu-jitsu fighter Sada Miyako with a rabo de arraia kick, O Malho, 1909.

Upon arriving in Rio de Janeiro aboard the Benjamin Constant, Miyako was hired by the Navy to train officers at Fortaleza de Villegagnon, later extending his teachings to Army personnel. He remained in Brazil for some time, giving private lessons, performing demonstrations, and engaging in public fights—most notably his 1909 match against capoeirista Francisco da Silva Ciríaco, which became legendary.

Mitsuyo Maeda, a distinguished judo black belt from the Kodokan, trained under Tomita Tsunejirō—the first student of judo's founder, Kano Jigoro—and embarked on a global mission to showcase and spread judo. Departing Japan in 1904, Maeda traveled to various countries, demonstrating his skills and taking on challengers like wrestlers, boxers, savate fighters, and other martial artists. His journey led him to Brazil, where he arrived by November 14, 1914 (some sources record his arrival as early as September 1914).

=== Maeda & Gracie ===
In Brazil, Maeda's demonstrations of "Kano jiu-jitsu"—a term then synonymous with judo—laid the groundwork for what would become Brazilian jiu-jitsu. In 1916, the American Circus in Belém, where Gastão Gracie was a business partner, hosted performances by the Queirolo Brothers, an Italian-Argentine circus troupe, who introduced Maeda to the audience. The following year, Gastão's eldest son, Carlos Gracie, attended one of Maeda's demonstrations at the Da Paz Theatre and was inspired to study the art.

According to the Gracie family's account, Carlos became a direct student of Maeda at his school, which was overseen by Jacyntho Ferro. However, some Brazilian jiu-jitsu practitioner historians like Robert Drysdale challenge this narrative, proposing that Carlos was primarily instructed by Ferro rather than Maeda himself. Regardless, Carlos went on to share his knowledge with his brothers, including Hélio Gracie. Due to his smaller build, Hélio struggled with executing many judo throws and with judo techniques that relied on overpowering opponents. Instead, he refined the art, emphasizing ground fighting and leverage—key aspects of jiu-jitsu and judo's ne-waza—over traditional throws. This adaptation became the cornerstone of Gracie jiu-jitsu.

While the Gracie family is widely celebrated for popularizing Brazilian jiu-jitsu, another significant parallel lineage emerged through Luiz França and gained prominence through his student Oswaldo Fadda. The França-Fadda lineage claims roots from Soshihiro Satake, Geo Omori, and Mitsuyo Maeda, although some practitioner historians like Drysdale speculate from data that França either learned from the Gracies or was self taught. Fadda's students were renowned for their mastery of footlocks and for defeating the Gracies in notable gym battles. Fadda's influence endures today through teams like Nova União and Grappling Fight Team.

Beyond the Gracie and França-Fadda lineages, Brazilian jiu-jitsu in Brazil has branched into several prominent schools, including Gracie Humaitá, Gracie Barra, Carlson Gracie Jiu-Jitsu, and Alliance Jiu Jitsu. Each of these lineages traces its roots back to the teachings Mitsuyo Maeda introduced to Brazil over a century ago.

=== Name ===
The name "jiu-jitsu" derives from an older romanization of its original spelling in the West; the modern Hepburn romanization of 柔術 is "jūjutsu".

When Maeda left Japan, judo was still often referred to as "Kano jiu-jitsu", or, even more generically, simply as jiu-jitsu. Higashi, the co-author of The Complete Kano Jiu-Jitsu (Judo) wrote in the foreword:

Some confusion has arisen over the employment of the term 'jiudo'. To make the matter clear I will state that jiudo is the term selected by Professor Kano as describing his system more accurately than jiu-jitsu does. Professor Kano is one of the leading educators of Japan, and it is natural that he should cast about for the technical word that would most accurately describe his system. But the Japanese people generally still cling to the more popular nomenclature and call it jiu-jitsu.

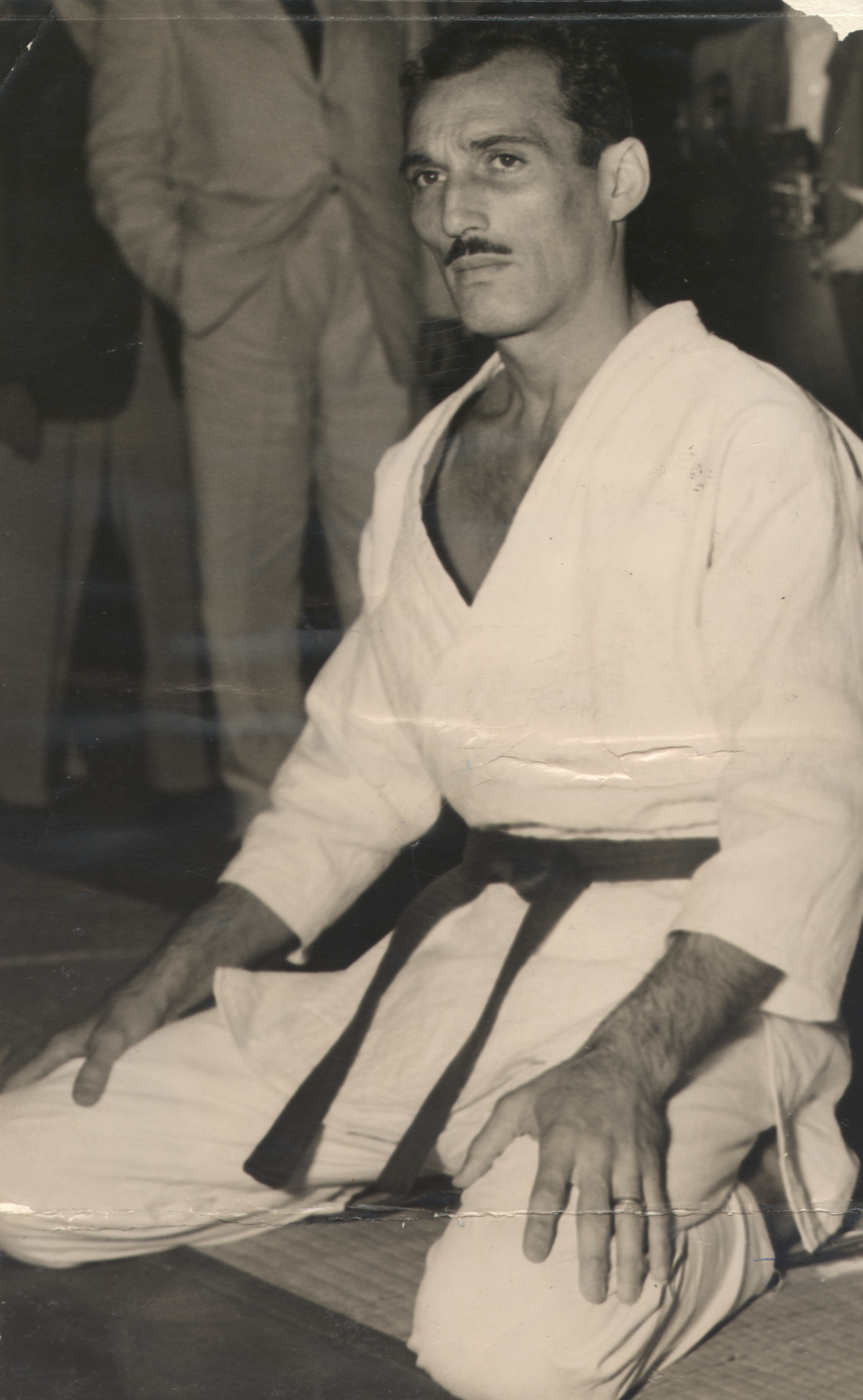
Young Hélio Gracie in 1952.

Outside Japan, however, this distinction was noted even less. Thus, when Maeda and Satake arrived in Brazil in 1914, every newspaper announced their art as being "jiu-jitsu", despite both men being Kodokan judoka.

It was not until 1925 that the Japanese government itself officially mandated that the correct name for the martial art taught in the Japanese public schools should be "judo" rather than "jujutsu". In Brazil, the art is still called "jiu-jitsu". When the Gracies went to the United States and spread jiu-jitsu, they used the terms "Gracie jiu-jitsu", while non-Gracies used the term "Brazilian jiu-jitsu" to differentiate from the already present styles using similar-sounding names. In a 1994 interview with Yoshinori Nishi, Hélio Gracie said that he did not even know the word judo itself until the sport came in the 1950s to Brazil, because he heard that Mitsuyo Maeda called his style "jiu-jitsu".

The art is sometimes referred to as Gracie jiu-jitsu (GJJ), a name trademarked by Rorion Gracie, but after a legal dispute with his cousin Carley Gracie, his trademark to the name was voided. Other members of the Gracie family often call their style by personalized names, such as Ceser Gracie Jiu-Jitsu or Renzo Gracie Jiu-Jitsu, and similarly, the Machado family call their style Machado Jiu-Jitsu (MJJ). While each style and its instructors have their own unique aspects, they are all basic variations of Brazilian jiu-jitsu.

Brazilian jiu-jitsu shares many techniques with the original Kodokan judo, especially certain styles practiced before judo became part of the Olympics such as Kosen judo, and still practiced to a lesser extent, as well as with some earlier ryu jujutsu schools with their ground work emphasis that were historical predecessors like Okayama newaza (Takenouchi/Fusen ryu), Oguri ryu, and Tenshin-Shinyo ryu. Because of this some practitioners have suggested that Brazilian jiu-jitsu should just be called "jiu-jitsu".

=== Divergence from Kodokan Judo and Jujutsu ===
Certain changes were made to the rules of judo after it was introduced to Brazil. Some of these rule changes sought to enhance it as a spectator sport, and to improve safety. Several of these rule changes de-emphasized the groundwork aspects of judo, and others have reduced the range of joint locks application. Brazilian jiu-jitsu since its inception did not strictly follow Kodokan judo rules; this divergence helped BJJ develop a distinct identity, becoming a groundwork and submission focus fighting style. This difference was later consolidated with the creation of a new set of rules that guide the BJJ practice today.

Even though BJJ uses and allows many of the techniques found in judo and jujutsu, the evolution of these techniques in BJJ has followed a distinct path, giving primary emphasis to ground fighting positions and maneuvers, and having the guard as the central working point of the fight. This is reflected in how different fighting techniques are scored in competition. In BJJ positions such as the rear mount receive a higher score, and the focus of the fight is to establish a dominant position against the adversary on the ground and submit them using chokeholds or joint locks. By contrast in judo, throwing techniques are scored higher and can give a direct victory if executed correctly, the goal of the fight is to sweep or throw the opponent to the ground to win.

BJJ also allows heel hooks and knee-reaping which are prohibited in judo, and any takedowns used in wrestling, sambo, or other grappling arts, including direct attempts to take down by touching the legs or dragging the opponent to the ground. Spinal locks and cervical locks are not allowed in gi jiu-jitsu, amateur MMA, multiple forms of no-gi jiu-jitsu, Judo, and other martial arts, due to their potential to cause serious injury. BJJ also has become more "sports-oriented" in the 21st century, prohibiting techniques such as slams. Another divergence of BJJ from judo and jujutsu is that BJJ allows no-gi practice and competition, with its own subset of rules. Use of holds and takedowns from wrestling and other grappling styles is common in no-gi BJJ, and light strikes may also be used when the competition rules permit, such as the open palm strike in CJJ (Combat jiu-jitsu).

=== Prominence ===
In 1972, Carlos Gracie moved to the United States to teach Brazilian jiu-jitsu, and in 1978 was followed by Rorion Gracie, who co-founded the Ultimate Fighting Championship (UFC) in 1993. Jiu-jitsu came to international prominence in martial arts circles when Brazilian jiu-jitsu expert Royce Gracie won the first, second and fourth Ultimate Fighting Championships, which at the time were single elimination martial arts tournaments. Royce fought successfully against several larger opponents proficient in other fighting styles, including boxing, shootfighting, Muay Thai, karate, wrestling, and taekwondo. BJJ has since become an elementary aspect of MMA, revealing the importance of ground fighting in a fight. Sport BJJ tournaments continue to grow in popularity and have given rise to no-gi submission grappling tournaments, such as the ADCC Submission Wrestling World Championship and NAGA, the North American Grappling Association. Sport BJJ has also become a popular method of fitness around the world in recent years. By the early 2000s, Brazilian jiu-jitsu became a sport that is known worldwide.

== Style of fighting ==
Brazilian jiu-jitsu focuses on getting an opponent to the ground in order to neutralize possible strength or size advantages through ground fighting techniques and submission holds involving joint locks and chokeholds. On the ground, physical strength can be offset or enhanced through proper grappling techniques.

BJJ (Brazilian jiu-jitsu) employs a wide range of takedown techniques to bring an opponent to the ground such as "pulling guard", which is not used in other combat sports such as judo or wrestling. Once the opponent is on the ground, a number of manoeuvres (and counter-manoeuvres) are available to manipulate the opponent into a suitable position for the application of a submission technique. Achieving a dominant position on the ground is one of the hallmarks of BJJ, which includes effective use of the guard position to defend oneself from bottom (using both submissions and sweeps, with sweeps leading to the possibility of dominant position or an opportunity to pass the guard), and passing the guard to dominate from top position with side control, mount, and back mount positions. This system of manoeuvring and manipulation can be likened to a form of kinetic or physical chess when executed by two experienced practitioners. A submission hold in BJJ is often likened to the equivalent of "checkmate", where the opponent is left with no other option but to tap, be injured, or choked.

Renzo Gracie wrote in his book Mastering Jujitsu:

"The classical jujutsu of old Japan appeared to have no common strategy to guide a combatant over the course of a fight. Indeed, this was one of Kano's most fundamental and perceptive criticisms of the classical program." Maeda not only taught the art of judo to Carlos Gracie, but also taught a particular philosophy about the nature of combat developed by Kano, and further refined by Maeda based on his worldwide travels competing against fighters skilled in a wide variety of martial arts.

The book details Maeda's theory as arguing that physical combat could be broken down into distinct phases, such as the striking phase, the grappling phase, the ground phase, etc. Thus, it was a smart fighter's task to keep the fight located in the phase of combat best suited to his own strengths. Renzo Gracie stated that this was a fundamental influence of the Gracie approach to combat. These strategies were further developed over time by the Gracie family, among others, and became prominent in contemporary MMA.

=== Training methods ===
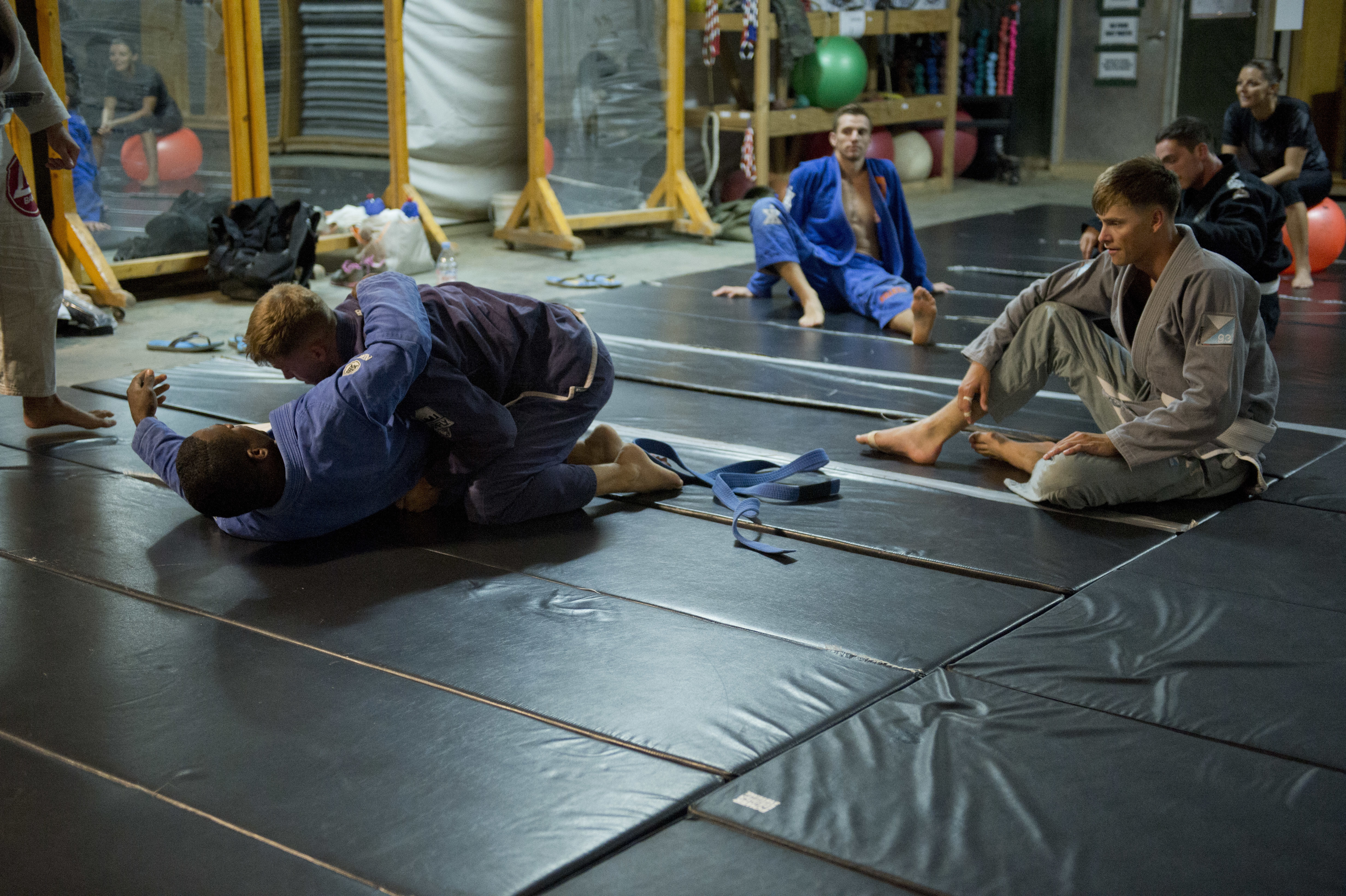
A Brazilian jiu-jitsu instructor demonstrates how to tackle an opponent.

As BJJ focuses on submissions, sparring and live drilling ("rolling") become the most essential part of the training regime. This type of training allows practitioners to practice at full speed and with full strength, resembling the effort made in a competition. Training methods include drills in which techniques are practiced against a non-resisting and resisting partners; isolation sparring (commonly referred to as positional drilling) where only a certain technique or sets of techniques are used; and full sparring where each practitioner tries to submit their opponent through technique. Physical conditioning is also an important aspect of training.

The Gracie family lineage descended from Helio Gracie focuses on practical applications of BJJ that apply primarily to self-defense. They will often run development drills in which a person is surrounded by a circle of other students who will attempt to attack the defending student, who in turn must defend themselves using techniques.

=== Etiquette & Customs ===
Brazilian jiu-jitsu gyms typically follow a set of ground rules to instill trust, respect, and cleanliness amongst students. While some gyms adhere to less formalities than others, some still follow traditional customs. Common practices include:

- Taking shoes off before stepping on the mat.
- Bowing before and after stepping on the mat.
- Lining up in rank order before and after class.
- Teaching or explaining techniques to lower ranked students.
- Addressing the teacher as coach or professor.
- Keeping your gi closed with a belt.
- Bowing or shaking hands before and after sparring.
- Covering any cuts with tape or gauze.
- Having good hygiene practices including brushing teeth, having a clean gi, and wearing deodorant.
- Respecting rolling with upper belts as a privilege.

== Primary ground positions ==
Once on the ground, the BJJ practitioner strives to take a dominant or controlling position from where to apply submissions. These positions provide different submission or transition options.

=== Side control ===
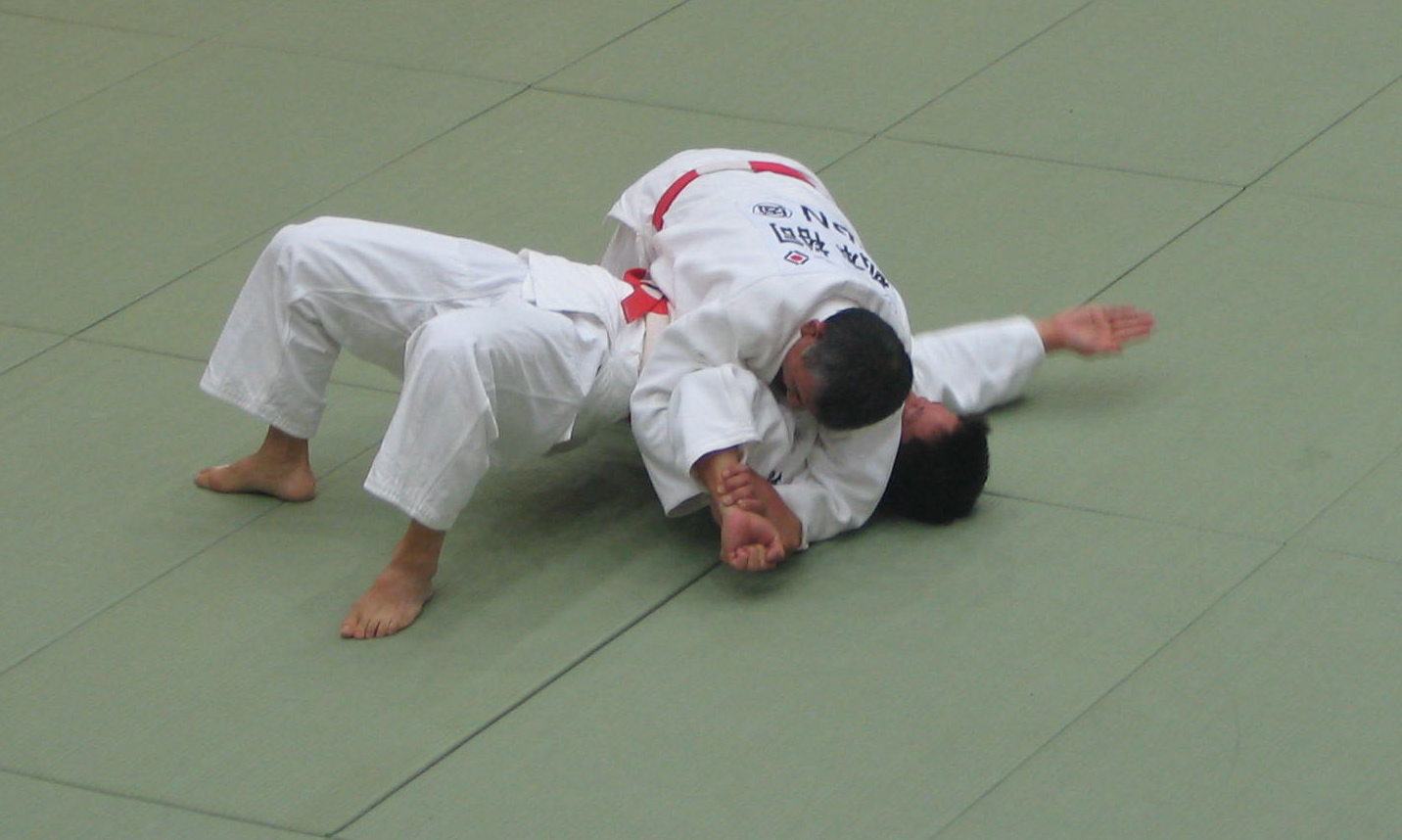
An Americana armlock submission from traditional side control.

In side control (also known as side mount, cross-side and cem quilos—"a hundred kilograms" in Brazilian Portuguese), the practitioner pins their opponent to the ground from the side of their torso. The top grappler lies across the opponent, with weight applied to the opponent's chest. The opponent may be further controlled by pressure on either side of the shoulders and hips from the practitioner's elbows, shoulders, and knees. A wide variety of submissions can be initiated from side control. Additionally, the typical side control increases the opportunity for the top-side grappler to advance to other dominant positions. This position is often used in MMA as it allows the top fighter to strike whilst overcoming their opponents' defense. There are many variants of the side control position, including kesa gatame, reverse side control (or switch-base), and others.

=== Knee-on-belly ===
The knee-on-belly position (also known as knee ride) is a modified side pin that is distinctly separated from the side control position. The knee-on-belly position is characterized primarily by the control of the opponent with one leg out for base and balance and the other leg positioned across the opponent's torso, pinning them to the ground. This form of pin is a mobile pin rather than a static pin, and is considered a more dominant position in many grappling formats. The knee-on-belly position is worth additional points because it provides a greater striking platform than traditional side control and is closer to achieving the more ideal mounted position.

=== Full mount ===
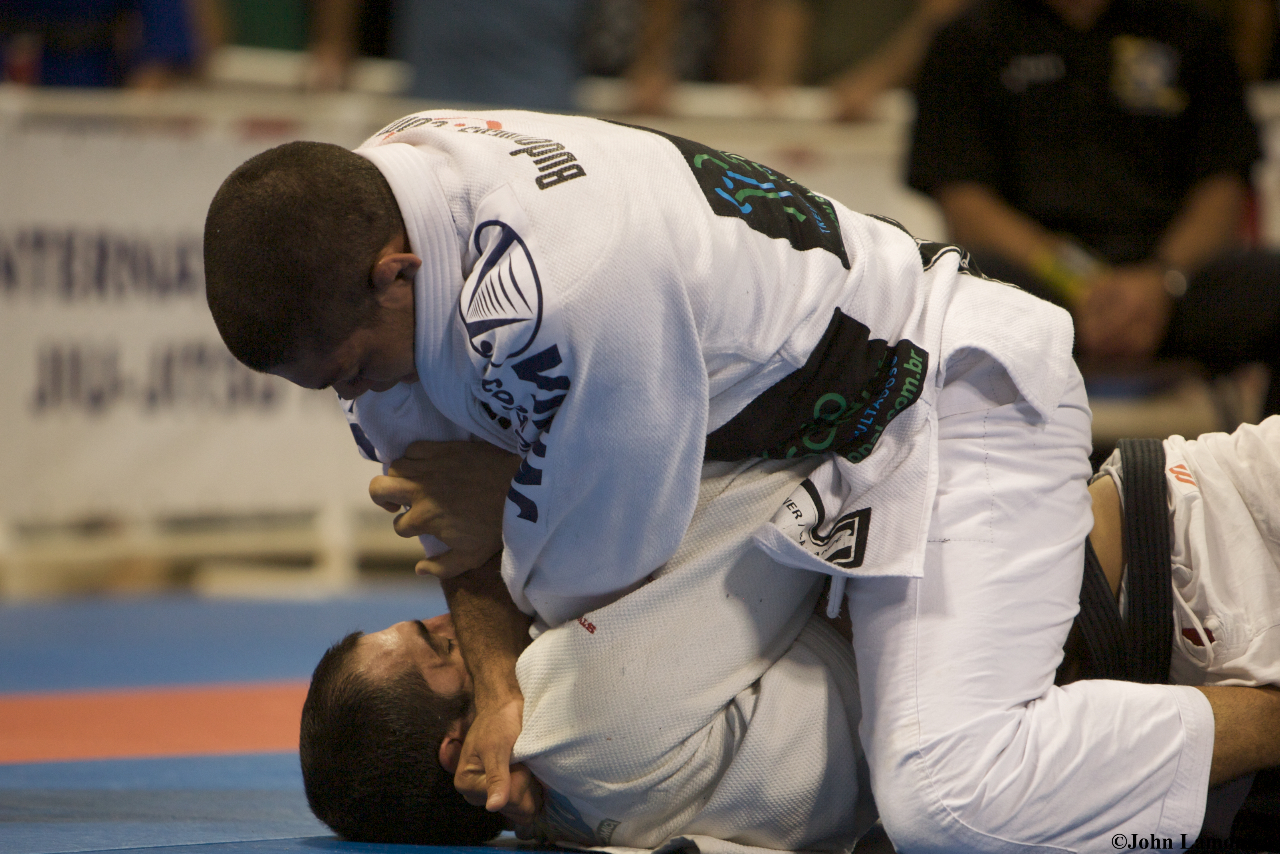
Full mount is considered one of the most dominant grappling positions.

In the mount (or full mount) position, the practitioner sits astride the opponent's front torso or chest, controlling the opponent with body-weight and hips. In this position, the person attacking from mount can isolate their opponent's arms (bringing them overhead), which creates a strong attacking position. Full Mount can be used to apply a variety of submissions, including armlocks or chokes. There are different types of mount — depending on body positioning — including low-mount, mid-mount, high-mount, S-mount, and technical mount.

=== Back mount ===
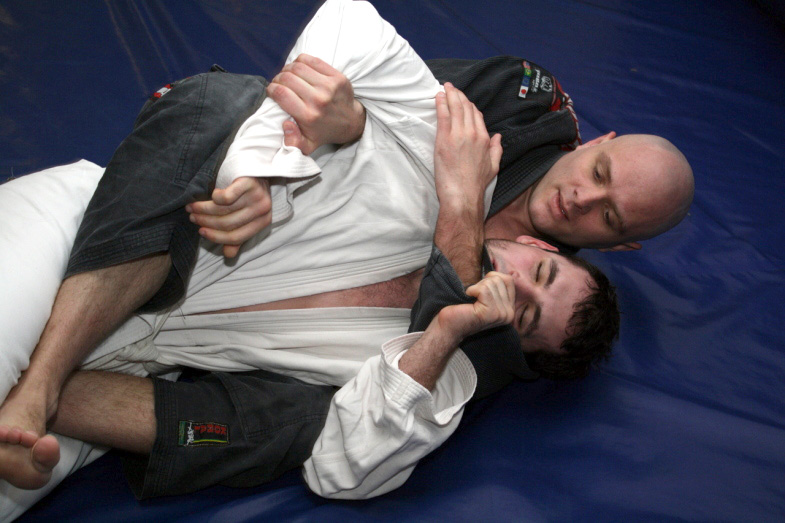
Back mount, also considered one of the most dominant positions in BJJ

When taking the back mount position (often known in Brazilian jiu-jitsu as back control or attacking the back), the practitioner attaches to the back of the opponent by wrapping his legs around and hooking the opponent's thighs with their heel, or locking in a body triangle by crossing one shin across the waist like a belt then placing the back of the opposing knee over the instep as if finishing a triangle choke. Simultaneously, the upper body is controlled by wrapping the arms around the chest or neck of the opponent. This position is often used to apply chokeholds, as well as armlocks and triangles, and neutralizes an opponent's potential size or strength advantage.

=== North south ===
The North South position occurs when a practitioner is lying on top of their opponent, with their weight over their opponent's chest and head area, with their legs pointing away from their opponent. Control is established by controlling the opponent's head and/or arms. As with most top controlling positions in BJJ, the top practitioner applies pressure by bringing their hips downwards towards the ground, generating what is referred to as dead weight. There are several submissions and transitions that are possible from the North South position, most commonly the North South choke, North South kimura, and others.

=== Guards ===
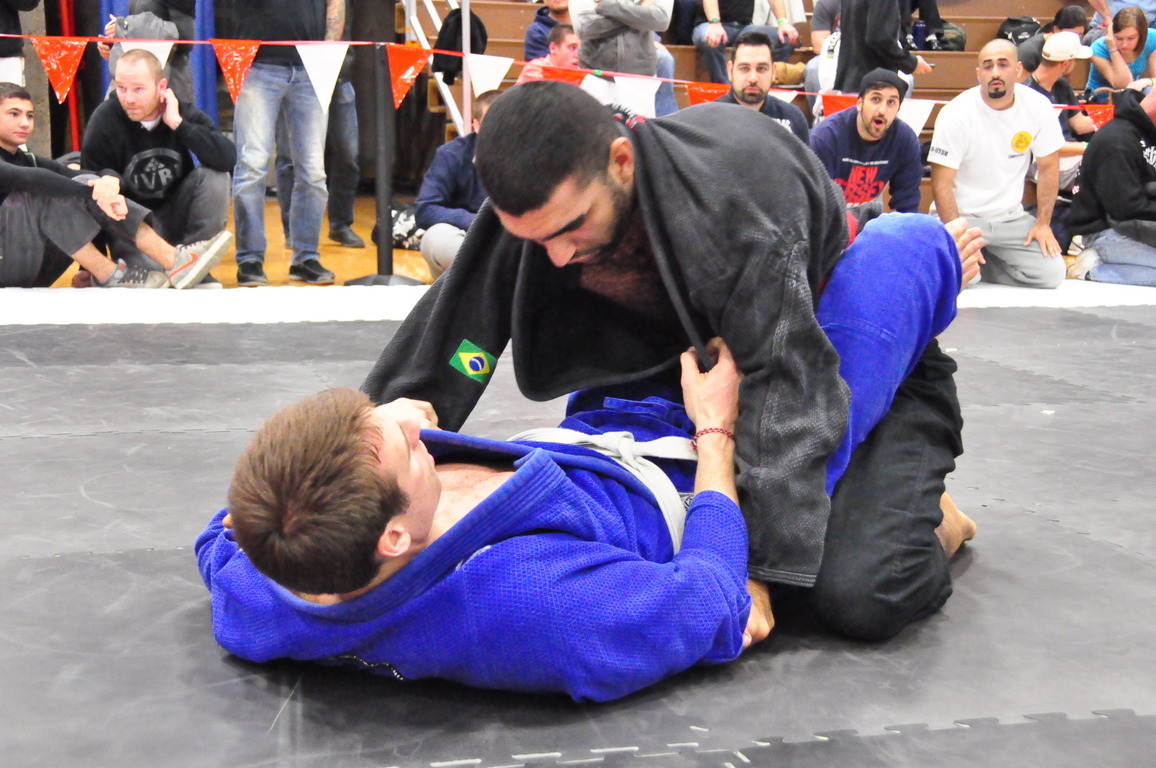
The Jiu-Jitsu practitioner in blue is demonstrating a type of closed guard

When in the "Guard" position, the practitioner is on their back controlling an opponent with his legs. The bottom practitioner pushes and pulls with the legs or feet to unbalance and limit the movements of his opponent. This position allows practitioners a wide variety of counter-attacks from the bottom position, including submissions and sweeps.

The three most common types of guards include the Closed Guard, Half Guard, and Open Guard.

In closed guard, the bottom grappler has his legs around the opponent's hips, with ankles closed together to control their opponent. The closed guard can be an effective position. This guard allows many setups for submissions such as joint locks and chokes, as well as sweeps. In the open guard, the legs are not hooked together and the bottom grappler uses his legs or feet to push or pull their opponent.

There are many variations of open guard with distinct names and positioning including the Butterfly Guard, De La Riva Guard, X-Guard, K-Guard, Rubber guard, Spider Guard, Octopus Guard, Lapel Guard, Worm Guard (made popular by Keenan Cornelius) and others. Butterfly guard is when the bottom grappler brings his legs up and feet together against the inner thighs of top opponent. The name is derived from the resulting butterfly wing shape. Butterfly guard increases both space to maneuver and the ability to counter the opponent with the shins or arches of the feet against the competitor's inner thighs. Spider guard is when the bottom grappler puts one or two of his feet on his opponents arms, this guard is effective at keeping control on the bottom and can be used to set up sweeps or submissions.

In the half guard, one of the top grappler's legs is controlled by the bottom grappler's legs, preventing the top opponent from passing side control or full mount positions. There is also a variant of half guard called "50/50 guard", which consist of each opponent usually in sitting positions with one of their legs hooking the same leg of their opponent in a mirrored fashion. This position is called 50/50 because neither opponent has a distinct advantage, where both sides have the same possibilities of sweeps and attacks.

Another variation of the half guard position is the "deep half guard", which involves the bottom grappler positioning themselves underneath their opponent, grabbing the top grappler's thigh. This gives the individual on the bottom the opportunity to sweep their opponent, and end up on a more dominant, top position. This position was popularized by American BJJ Black Belt, Jeff Glover.

The De La Riva Guard (DLR) is an open guard technique in Brazilian jiu-jitsu, named after the competitor Ricardo De La Riva. While not an entirely new concept in grappling, as it had origins in nonatei style judo credited to Oda Tsunetane, it gained prominence through De La Riva's use. In Brazilian jiu-jitsu, the DLR Guard is identified when a competitor lies on their back, controlling their opponent with open legs. This position is defined by one leg hooking outside the opponent's leg (e.g., the guard player's left leg hooking the passer's right leg), thereby compromising the passer's balance.

== Submissions ==
The majority of submission holds can be grouped into two broad categories: joint locks and chokes. Joint locks typically involve isolating an opponent's limb and creating a lever with the body position, which will force the joint to move past its normal range of motion. Pressure is increased in a controlled manner and released if the opponent cannot escape the hold and signals defeat by tapping. A choke hold can disrupt the blood supply to the brain and cause unconsciousness if the opponent does not tap when required.

=== Compression locks ===
See also Compression lock

A less common type of submission hold is a compression lock, where the muscle of an opponent is compressed against a hard, large bone (commonly the shin or forearm), causing significant pain to the opponent. These types of locks are not usually allowed in competition due to the high risk of tearing muscle tissue. This type of lock also often hyper-extends the joint in the opposite direction, pulling it apart. Some compression locks include the Achilles lock, Biceps slicer, and Leg slicer (or Calf slicer).

=== Joint locks ===
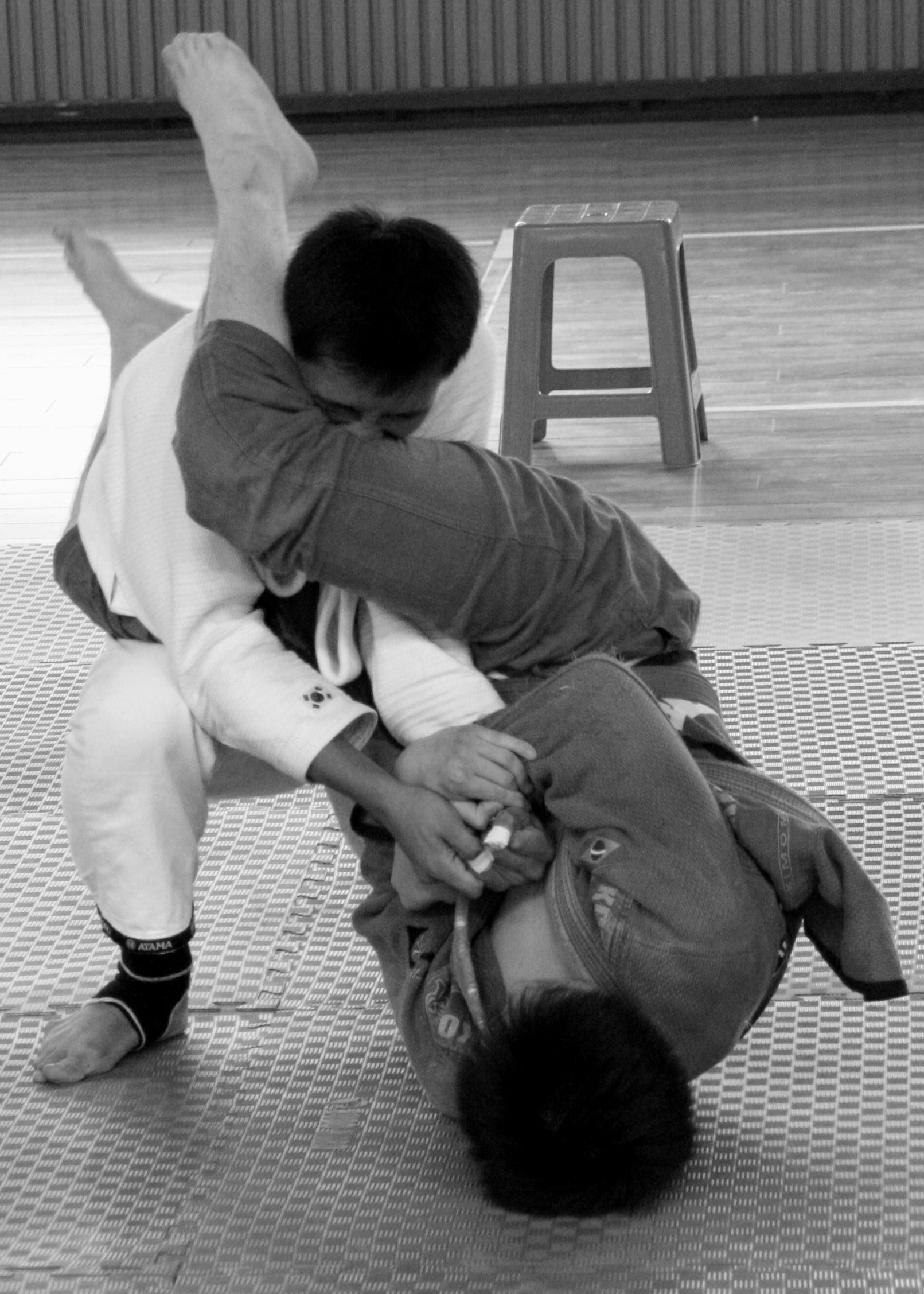
A practitioner attempting an armbar submission

While many joint locks are permitted in BJJ, most competitions ban or restrict some or all joint locks that involve the knees, ankles, and spine. The reason for this is that the angles of manipulation required to cause pain are nearly the same as those that would cause serious injury. Joint locks that require a twisting motion of the knee (such as heel hooks) are usually banned in gi competitions because successfully completing the move can frequently result in permanent damage, often requiring surgery. Similarly, joint manipulations of the spine are typically barred due to the inherent danger of crushing or misaligning cervical vertebrae. Leglocks are allowed in varying degrees depending on skill level, with the most prominent BJJ tournaments typically allowing only the straight ankle lock and muscle stretching submissions such as the "banana split" from white through purple belt, with the kneebar, toehold, and calf slicer submissions being permitted at brown and black belt. Heel hooks and knee-reaping are illegal in gi BJJ, since they are considered to be exceptionally dangerous techniques, but are allowed by IBJJF rules in no-gi competitions. Most joint locks involving the wrist, elbow, shoulder or ankle are permitted as there is a great deal more flexibility in those joints and those locks are usually safe.

Joint locks include armbars, kimuras, Americanas, straight-arm lock, omoplata, marceloplata, tarikoplata, banana split (or electric chair), twister, wrist lock, heel hook, toehold, kneebar, straight ankle lock, and others.

=== Chokes ===
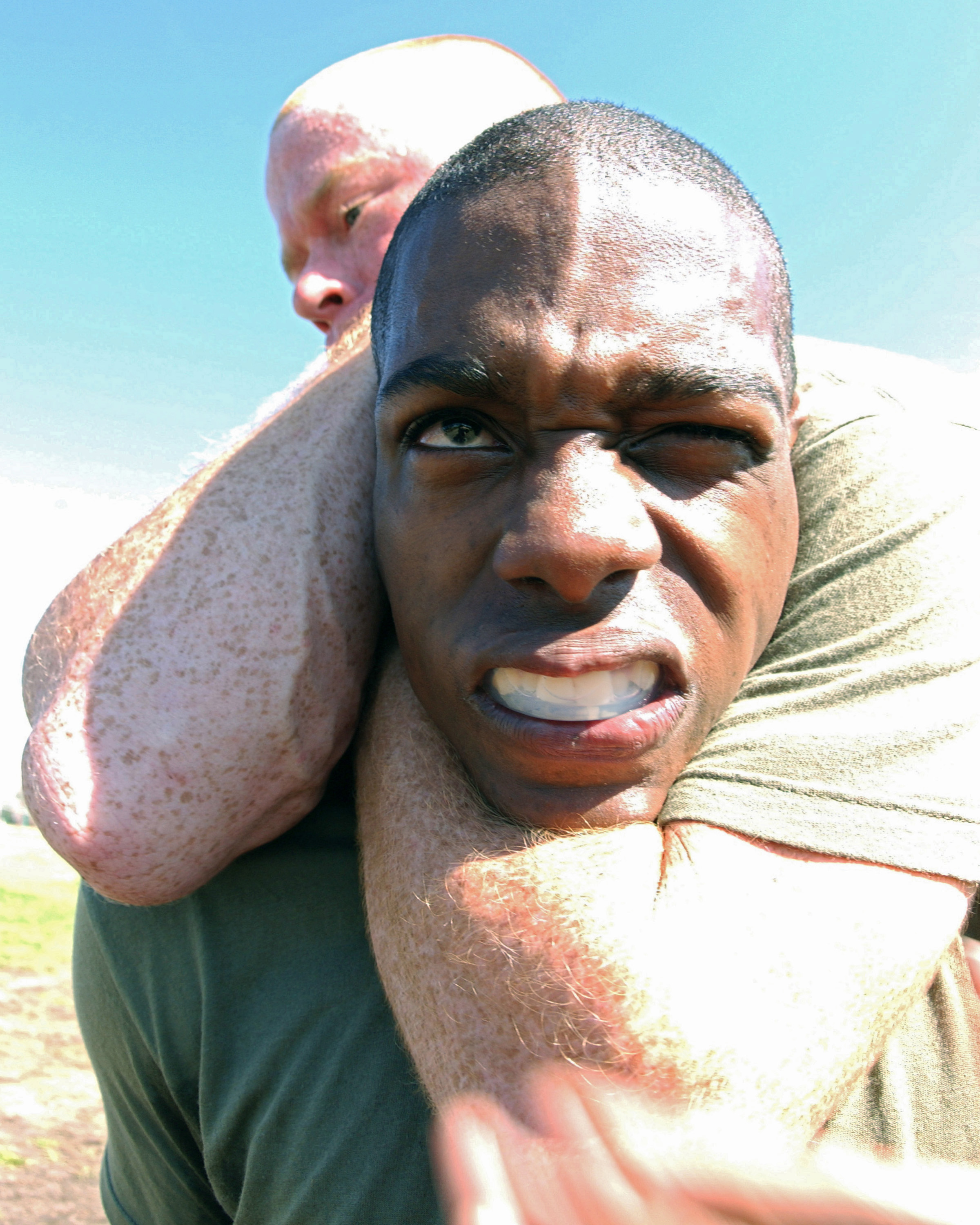
A rear naked choke or "mata-leão" in Brazilian Portuguese (lion killer choke) as demonstrated by a MCMAP instructor

Chokeholds or chokes are a common form of submission. They can be applied either by using the gi as the method of attack (e.g. the bow-and-arrow choke), or by using a combination of head and arm, or even leg pressure (e.g. the triangle choke).

In BJJ, strangles are used to put pressure on the carotid arteries, and may also apply pressure to the nerve baroreceptors in the neck. This kind of strangle is very fast acting (if done properly) with victims typically losing consciousness in a matter of seconds.

In contrast, some techniques function as an air choke (involving constriction of the windpipe), such as an Ezekiel choke or Sode guruma jime. Many techniques can, in effect, be a choke or a strangle (or both) depending on how they are applied.

Strangles include rear-naked choke, bow-and-arrow choke, triangle, Guillotine choke, sleeve choke (or Ezekiel choke), cross collar choke (or X choke), baseball choke, Clock choke, D'Arce choke, Anaconda choke, arm triangle choke, north–south choke, crucifix choke, gogoplata, loop choke, lapel half nelson choke, and others.

== Uniform ==
The Brazilian jiu-jitsu practitioner's uniform is commonly referred to as gi or kimono is similar to a judogi, but with slight differences in the dimensions and often made of lighter material with tighter cuffs on the pants and jacket. This allows the practitioner to benefit from a closer fit, providing less material for an opponent to manipulate. Traditionally, to be promoted in Brazilian jiu-jitsu, the wearing of the jiu-jitsu gi while training is a requirement. Recently with the growing popularity of "no-gi" Brazilian jiu-jitsu has the practice of giving out belts to no-gi practitioners (e.g., Rolles Gracie awarding Rashad Evans a black belt) has become more common.

There are certain differences between gi jiu-jitsu and "no-gi" jiu-jitsu. In gi jiu-jitsu one can grip an opponent's uniform, using it to submit or advance position. There are a number of submissions that are specific to the gi, such as the "Loop choke", "Collar choke", and others. A specific set of rules to guide no-gi competitions is issued by the IBJJF, but there may be variation in the set of rules applied in each competition. By IBJJF rules uniform grips are not permitted in "no-gi" jiu-jitsu. BJJ athletes who practice no-gi usually wear a rash guard and MMA shorts with spats underneath.

== Grading ==
Black belt grades (19 and over)
Black 0–6
Black/Red 7
Red/White 8
Red 9–10

Senior belt colours (16 and over)
White
Blue
Purple
Brown

Junior belt colours (15 and under)
White
Grey
Yellow
Orange
Green

The Brazilian jiu-jitsu ranking system awards a practitioner different coloured belts to signify increasing levels of technical knowledge and practical skill. While the system's structure shares its origins with the judo ranking system and the origins of all coloured belts, it now contains many of its own unique aspects and themes. Some of these differences are relatively minor, such as the division between youth and adult belts and the stripe/degree system. Others are quite distinct and have become synonymous with the art, such as a higher degree of informality in promotional criteria, a focus on competitive demonstration of skill, and a conservative approach to promotion in general.

Traditionally, the concept of competitive skill demonstration as a quickened and earned route of promotion holds true. Some schools have placed a green belt for adults between the white and blue belt ranks due to the long periods between advancement. In addition, the use of a grey belt has been instituted for many children's programs to signal progress between the white and yellow belt rankings.

A black belt in Brazilian jiu-jitsu commonly takes more than several years to earn, and the rank is generally considered expert level. The amount of time it takes to achieve the rank of black belt varies between the practitioner. Some notable individuals who had previous backgrounds in other martial arts have been promoted directly to black belt rank without going through any intermediate rank, though this has fallen out of favour in recent times. Others have achieved the rank in relatively short time frames. Outside of exceptions such as these, the average time frame is around 10 years with a consistent training schedule. However, Ryron Gracie (grandson/grandnephew of founders Hélio and Carlos Gracie) has stated that the average of 10–12 years is longer than necessary, suggesting that the ego of the practitioner often hinders progress, and advancement to black belt should take about 7 years.

== Federations ==
Since its inception Brazilian jiu-jitsu has had different registered federations and tournaments. The first jiu-jitsu federation was the Jiu-Jitsu Federation of Guanabara, which has remained a regional federation of Rio de Janeiro, while many others were founded. Among the most prestigious of the many federations are the Sport Jiu Jitsu International Federation (SJJIF), a nonprofit organization with federations and tournaments around the globe with the mission of making jiu-jitsu an Olympic sport, the International Brazilian Jiu-Jitsu Federation, a for-profit organization that hosts a number of tournaments and JJGF, founded by Rickson Gracie, which has focus on both BJJ as self-defense and as a sport.

== Weight classes ==
The weight classes for BJJ competitions can differ depending on the organisation that is promoting the event. The IBJJF weight classes are the most commonly used, under the IBJJF rules, the weight classes vary by age, sex and competition type (Gi vs Nogi).

IBJJF Adults/Masters Weight Classes
Weight divisions	Adults/Masters Gi – male	Adults/Masters No Gi – male	Adults/Masters Gi – female	Adults/Masters No Gi – female
Rooster; Galo	57.5 kg (126.8 lb)	55.5 kg (122.4 lb)	48.5 kg (106.9 lb)	46.5 kg (102.5 lb)
Light Feather; Pluma	64 kg (141.1 lb)	61.5 kg (135.6 lb)	53.5 kg (117.9 lb)	51.5 kg (113.5 lb)
Feather; Pena	70 kg (154.3 lb)	67.5 kg (148.8 lb)	58.5 kg (129.0 lb)	56.5 kg (124.6 lb)
Light; Leve	76 kg (167.6 lb)	73.5 kg (162.0 lb)	64 kg (141.1 lb)	61.5 kg (135.6 lb)
Middle; Médio	82.3 kg (181.4 lb)	79.5 kg (175.3 lb)	69 kg (152.1 lb)	66.5 kg (146.6 lb)
Medium Heavy; Meio-Pesado	88.3 kg (194.7 lb)	85.5 kg (188.5 lb)	74 kg (163.1 lb)	71.5 kg (157.6 lb)
Heavy; Pesado	94.3 kg (207.9 lb)	91.5 kg (201.7 lb)	79.3 kg (174.8 lb)	76.5 kg (168.7 lb)
Super Heavy; Super Pesado	100.5 kg (221.6 lb)	97.5 kg (215.0 lb)	No weight limit	No weight limit
Ultra Heavy; Pesadissimo	No weight limit	No weight limit	n/a	n/a
Open Class; Absoluto	open to all weight divisions	open to all weight divisions	open to all weight divisions	open to all weight divisions

== Tournaments ==
While there are numerous local and regional tournaments administered regularly by private individuals and academies, there are two major entities in jiu-jitsu circles. First, is the Sport Jiu Jitsu International Federation (SJJIF), a (nonprofit) organization with international federations and tournaments. Second, is the International Brazilian Jiu-Jitsu Federation (IBJJF), a for-profit company that hosts a number of major tournaments worldwide. These include the Pan American Championship, European Championship, and the Mundials. California, New York, and Texas are the three states in the US which host tournaments most frequently. Other promotions within North America, such as Battleground Grappling Championship, American Grappling Federation (AGF), North American BJJ Federation (NABJJF), and North American Grappling Association (NAGA) host tournaments nationwide, but visit these states multiple times within a tournament season.

Another tournament to spring from the founding Gracie lineage is the Gracie Nationals or Gracie Worlds. Founded in 2007 by Rose Gracie, daughter of Ultimate Fighting Championship creator and Brazilian jiu-jitsu grandmaster Rorion Gracie. Gracie Nationals/Worlds followed the guidelines of other major tournaments of the time, implementing a points systems

In 2012, the Gracie Worlds introduced a new submission-only format, removing certain judging systems that many interpreted as an outdated scoring system. Rose spoke about this change when she said, "Today's tournaments aren't what my grandfather [Helio Gracie] envisioned. There's so many rules that it takes away from the actual art of jiu-jitsu. We don't see many submissions. We see cheating, we see decisions made by a referee. We need to stand together against this and support a submission only kind of revolution." Cheating in jiu-jitsu, Rose said, comes in many forms. "[A competitor] will earn a point, then hold for the entire match so they can win with that one little advantage they got at the start," Rose said. "That's not jiu-jitsu. That's cheating." Mark McDonnell from Gracie Botany agrees.

This discontent with points-based and advantage-style competition has been echoed throughout the jiu-jitsu community, leading to many prominent submission-only style events. At these events, the winner of a match is determined only by submission, and these tournaments at times have no time limit, or are timed with a result of double disqualification if there is no submission victory. This form of tournament have yet to become widespread, but is gaining in popularity especially amongst MMA competitors. Metamoris, a grappling competition event run by Rose's brother Ralek Gracie, has helped advocate this tournament form. Another notable example of a submission-only format is the EBI Eddie Bravo Invitational, which was the first televised event of its kind, and is now being featured on UFC Fight Pass. Other submission-only events have cropped up all over the world including TUFF invitational, Polaris Pro Grappling based in the United Kingdom, Submission Underground backed by longtime MMA star Chael Sonnen, and the QUINTET promotion, devised by Japanese MMA legend Kazushi Sakuraba and based around teams of five players each representing a different gym or background.

At tournaments, especially those hosted by the International Brazilian Jiu-Jitsu Federation (IBJJF), some athletes engage in a practice called "closing out". This occurs when two athletes, usually friends or members of the same team, meet in a match but refuse to fight. Tournament organizers can minimize the chance of close-outs by placing athletes from the same team on opposite sides of the bracket, a practice which makes the finals the only match in which they could possibly meet (assuming each team has no more than two competitors in a given bracket). When two athletes close out a match, they agree which one of them will technically forfeit to the other. As this most often occurs in the final matches of tournaments, this usually means deciding which of the two will win the gold medal and which will win the silver. Notable examples of closing out include Marcus "Buchecha" Almeida forfeiting the finals of the Absolute division at the 2018 IBJJF World Championship to his friend Leandro Lo, who had suffered a shoulder injury during a previous match, and frequent close outs between the brothers Paulo and Joao Miyao, who often compete in the same weight division. Proponents of close-outs claim it fosters team unity and allows competitors to train as hard and as freely as they can with their teammates. They say that facing a teammate in a competition would make them hold back in training. Critics of the practice say it diminishes audience enjoyment of tournaments where it is allowed, and some tournaments, notably the ADCC, ban it.

== Health considerations ==
=== Safety ===
Studies of competition injuries have reported rates in Brazilian jiu-jitsu of approximately 9 to 39 per 1,000 athlete exposures. These figures are lower than published rates for mixed martial arts, boxing, judo and taekwondo, although the underlying studies differ in design, population and injury definition. This is lower than in mixed martial arts (236~286 per 1000), boxing (210~420 per 1000), judo (25~131 per 1000) and taekwondo (21~140 per 1000). It is similar to wrestling, which also uses grappling instead of striking. The few injuries that may be incurred in Brazilian jiu-jitsu usually affect the joints and rarely the head. The most common injuries Brazilian jiu-jitsu practitioners suffer from are ACL tears, rotator cuff tears in the shoulders, and spinal disc herniations, most commonly in the neck region. Many are repairable via surgery that require an extended rehab period before the athlete can return to BJJ training. Also many athletes suffer from minor injuries, such as elbow, finger, and wrist tendonitis, due to overtraining and the grappling nature of the martial art, which can be strenuous and taxing for the joints and the tendons.

=== Skin health ===
Besides the normal strains and pulls associated with most martial arts, Brazilian jiu-jitsu practitioners (along with wrestlers, judoka, and other grapplers) are exposed to regular skin abrasions and potential unsanitary mat conditions. They are thus at higher risk for developing skin disease. Several commonly contracted skin diseases include ringworm, impetigo, herpes gladiatorum, and staph infection. Proper hygiene practices, including regular cleaning of classroom mats, showering immediately after class with soap, disinfecting and covering any open wounds, thorough cleaning of any gi/rashguard/headgear used before the next class, not sharing used towels/uniforms, and using a barrier cream greatly reduces the chance of contracting a disease.

=== Cauliflower ear ===
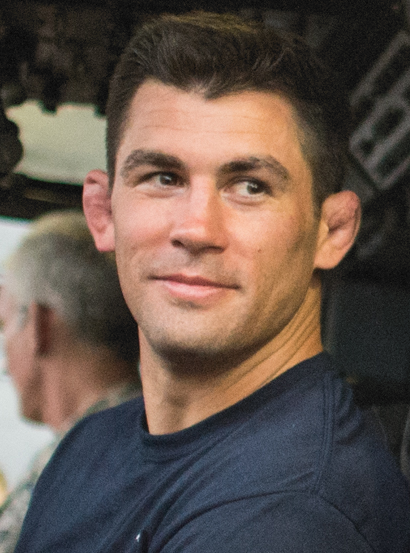
Dominick Cruz's cauliflower ears

Due to the use of the head to maintain position and attack in jiu-jitsu, the ears can easily be damaged and begin to swell. Without immediate medical treatment, the cartilage in a swollen ear will separate from the perichondrium that supplies its nutrients and will become permanently swollen/deformed (cauliflower ear). Wrestling headgear is sometimes used for the prevention of this condition. Treatment includes draining the hematoma or surgery.

=== Performance-enhancing drugs ===
The practice of taking performance-enhancing drugs, including anabolic steroids, is believed to be relatively commonplace among competitors in jiu-jitsu tournaments and has sparked letters and public statements by some of jiu-jitsu's top competitors, including Rodrigo Medeiros and Caio Terra. In response, the IBJJF began testing for performance-enhancing drugs at IBJJF sponsored events, starting with the 2013 Pan American Championship. However, most other tournaments, other than World Championships, tend to lack PED testing.

=== Cervical and spinal lock "neck cranks" ===
A spinal lock is a multiple joint lock applied to the spinal column, which is performed by forcing the spine beyond its normal ranges of motion. This is typically done by bending or twisting the head or upper body into abnormal positions. Commonly, spinal locks might strain the spinal musculature or result in a mild spinal sprain, while a forcefully and/or suddenly applied spinal lock may cause severe ligament damage or damage to the vertebrae, and possibly result in serious spinal cord injury, strokes, or death. Spinal locks and cervical locks are forbidden in gi jiu-jitsu, amateur MMA, multiple forms of no-gi jiu-jitsu, Judo, and other martial arts due to its illegal nature and express purpose to cause serious, irrevocable bodily injury, paralysis, and death. The forceful application of chokes such as the Rear Naked Choke and subsequent cranking of the neck whilst being choked can potentially lead to arterial dissection, which could lead to stroke.

=== Elbow injuries ===
Elbow injuries commonly occur from arm bars, Kimuras, and takedowns with a fall on outstretched hand (FOOSH). These injuries include LCL sprain [of elbow], MCL sprain [of elbow], anterior sprain of distal biceps tendon, elbow dislocation, and posterior tenderness at olecranon.

=== Knee injuries ===
Knee injuries occur from passing guard, takedowns, sweeps, direct pressure, and various stress with flexed knee. These injuries include LCL sprain [of knee], MCL sprain [of knee], and lateral meniscus tear.

=== Foot and ankle injuries ===
Foot and ankle injuries occur from pushing forward, takedowns, and footlocks. These injuries include ankle ATFL sprain, turf toe, and hyper flexion sprain of great toe.

=== Finger injuries ===
Finger injuries occur from getting caught in the gi, applying arm bars, and blocking opponents. These injuries include sprains, dislocations, and fractures.

=== Shoulder injuries ===
Shoulder injuries occur from Kimuras, takedowns with a fall on outstretched hand (FOOSH), and pushing opponents. These injuries include acromioclavicular separation, anterior dislocation, and anterior subluxation (partial dislocation).

=== Neck injuries ===
Neck injuries can occur from "neck cranks", arm triangle chokes and triangle chokes, amongst other neck focussed submissions (especially when resisting them). These injuries include cervical strains.

=== Rehab ===
Depending on the severity, many injuries require evaluation by a professional, usually a primary care provider, sports medicine physician, orthopedic surgeon, or physical therapist. Other injuries may be treated with a home exercise program.

== Notable fighters ==
=== World Champions ===
International Brazilian Jiu-Jitsu Federation world champions include the following (not exhaustive):

- Gordon Ryan (American)
- Mario Sperry (Brazilian)
- Clark Gracie (American)
- Roger Gracie (Brazilian)
- Amaury Bitetti (Brazilian)
- Romulo Barral (Brazilian)
- Ffion Davies (Welsh)
- Ricardo Liborio (Brazilian)
- Kyra Gracie (Brazilian)
- Claudia Gadelha (Brazilian)
- Andre Galvao (Brazilian)
- Leandro Lo (Brazilian)
- Marcelo Garcia (Brazilian)
- Mikey Musumeci (American)
- Tammi Musumeci (American)
- Demetrious Johnson (American)
- Cristiane Justino (Brazilian)
- Rafael Lovato Jr. (American)
- Demian Maia (Brazilian)
- Fredson Paixão (Brazilian)
- Tarsis Humphreys (Brazilian)
- B.J. Penn (American)
- Pablo Popovitch (Brazilian)
- Ronaldo Souza (Brazilian)
- Saulo Ribeiro (Brazilian)
- Xande Ribeiro (Brazilian)
- Marcus "Buchecha" Almeida (Brazilian)
- Rodolfo Vieira (Brazilian)
- Bernardo Faria (Brazilian)
- Leticia Ribeiro (Brazilian)
- Gabrielle Garcia (Brazilian)
- Vítor Ribeiro (Brazilian)
- Fabio Gurgel (Brazilian)
- Fabio Leopoldo (Brazilian)
- Braulio Estima (Brazilian)
- Rafael Mendes (Brazilian)
- Venla Luukkonen (Finnish)
- Guilherme Mendes (Brazilian)
- Leonardo Vieira (Brazilian)
- Ricardo Vieira (Brazilian)
- Paulo Miyao (Brazilian)
- Caio Terra (Brazilian)
- Claudio Calasans (Brazilian)
- Bruno Malfacine (Brazilian)
- Fabricio Werdum (Brazilian)
- Sérgio Moraes (Brazilian)
- Robson Moura (Brazilian)
- Rubens Charles Maciel (Brazilian)
- Dominyka Obelenyte (Lithuanian)
- Michael Langhi (Brazilian)
- Andresa Correa (Brazilian)
- Tayane Porfirio (Brazilian)
- Beatriz Mesquita (Brazilian)
- Michelle Nicolini (Brazilian)
- Mackenzie Dern (Brazilian/American)
- Gilbert Burns (Brazilian)
- Charles Oliveira (Brazilian)
- Alexandre Pantoja (Brazilian)
- Rafael dos Anjos (Brazilian)
- Jailton Almeida (Brazilian)
- Luana Alzuguir (Brazilian)
- Claudia do Val (Brazilian)
- Rikako Yuasa (Japanese)
- Lana Stefanac (American)
- Hannette Staack (Brazilian)
- Márcio Cruz (Brazilian)
- João Roque (Angolan/Portuguese)
- Nicholas Meregali (Brazilian)
- Adam Wardziński (Polish)

=== Jiu-jitsu masters (coral belts: 7th & 8th degree) ===
- Murilo Bustamante
- Márcio Stambowsky
- Carlos Machado
- Rigan Machado
- Jean Jacques Machado
- John Machado
- Mauricio Motta Gomes
- Romero "Jacare" Cavalcanti
- Megaton Dias
- Geny Rebello
- Sérgio Penha
- Royler Gracie
- Royce Gracie
- Renzo Gracie
- Fabio Santos
- Carlos "Caique" Elias
- Hilton Leão
- Ricardo De La Riva
- Luiz Fux
- Roberto Traven

=== Jiu-jitsu grand masters (9th degree red belts) ===
- Carlos Gracie Jr.
- Carlson Gracie
- Carley Gracie
- Geny Rebello
- Flavio Behring
- Rorion Gracie
- Relson Gracie
- Carlos Robson Gracie
- Rickson Gracie
- Rolls Gracie
- Joe Moreira

=== Jiu-jitsu grand masters (10th degree red belts) ===
- Carlos Gracie
- Helio Gracie
- Oswaldo Fadda
- Luiz França Filho
