= Geo Omori =

Japanese judoka (1898–1938)

Jyoji "Geo" Omori
- Born: 1898; Tokyo, Japan
- Died: 2 March 1938 (aged 39–40); Belo Horizonte, Brazil; Food poisoning
- Style: Brazilian jiu-jitsu, judo
- Teacher(s): Tokugoro Ito

Other information
- Notable students: Luiz França

Jyoji Omori (大森 城司, 大森 譲治, 大森 譲次, Omori Jyoji, 1898 – 2 March 1938), Geo Omori or George Omori as he became known in Brazil, was a Japanese-born Brazilian martial artist who is credited for being one of the creators of Brazilian Jiu Jitsu.

== Early life and education ==
Born in Tokyo, Omori joined the Kodokan school in 1907 at age 9 and gained his black belt in 1915 at age 17. He learned under Tokugoro Ito and was a training partner of the famed Sanpo Toku.

== Immigration and career ==
After moving to Brazil in 1925, he taught Jiu Jitsu and Judo in Rio de Janeiro, and in 1931 he opened a school in São Paulo in Edificio Martinelli, the first skyscraper in Brazil. Omori is considered instrumental in the foundation of Brazilian jiu-jitsu by establishing the first Jujitsu school in São Paulo. He would later instruct another key Brazilian Jiu-Jitsu founder Luiz França. His other students included Carlos Pereira.

== Fighting career ==
Omori was one of the first prominent mixed martial arts competitors of his era. He helped to initiate the Vale Tudo trend of the 1920s and 1930s in Brazil. Geo had an extensive fight history engaging fighters of various styles including capoeira, boxing, and wrestling. A 1928 issue of The New York Times highlighted one of his fights against a "negro" capoeira fighter, in which Geo Omori won. He fought many members of the Gracie family including George Gracie and Carlos Gracie. His feud with Carlos Gracie is well documented.

== Death ==
His premature death in 1938 was attributed to food poisoning.
