= Tokugoro Ito =

Japanese judoka and wrestler

Tokugoro Ito appeared in the Seattle Post-Intelligencer on November 6, 1909.

Tokugoro Ito (1878-January 22, 1939) was a Japanese judoka and professional wrestler. Ito was one of the founding fathers of mixed martial arts in Brazil.

== Early years ==
Ito was an instructor of judo at Tokyo Imperial University in Japan. In 1911, Akitaro Ono and Tokugoro Ito joined Mitsuyo Maeda and Soshihiro Satake in Cuba. The four men were known as the "Four Kings of Cuba".

== Wrestling ==
Ito's first wrestling match against someone not Japanese occurred in 1909. Ito defeated American Wrestler Eddie Robinson. In 1914, Ito engaged in many matches. He initially lost but later defeated Ad Santel in a wrestling match. The loss was a result of Ito being thrown on his head by Santel. Ito at the time was a 5th degree black belt in judo. He additionally defeated Joe Acton.

== Later years ==
In his later years he founded the Rafu Judo Dojo in Los Angeles and previously was a leader of the Seattle Dojo from 1907 to 1911. His notable students included Tsutao Higami. Ito was also an instructor of Geo Omori and Sanpo Toku.
