= Mitsuyo Maeda =

Japanese judoka (1878–1941)

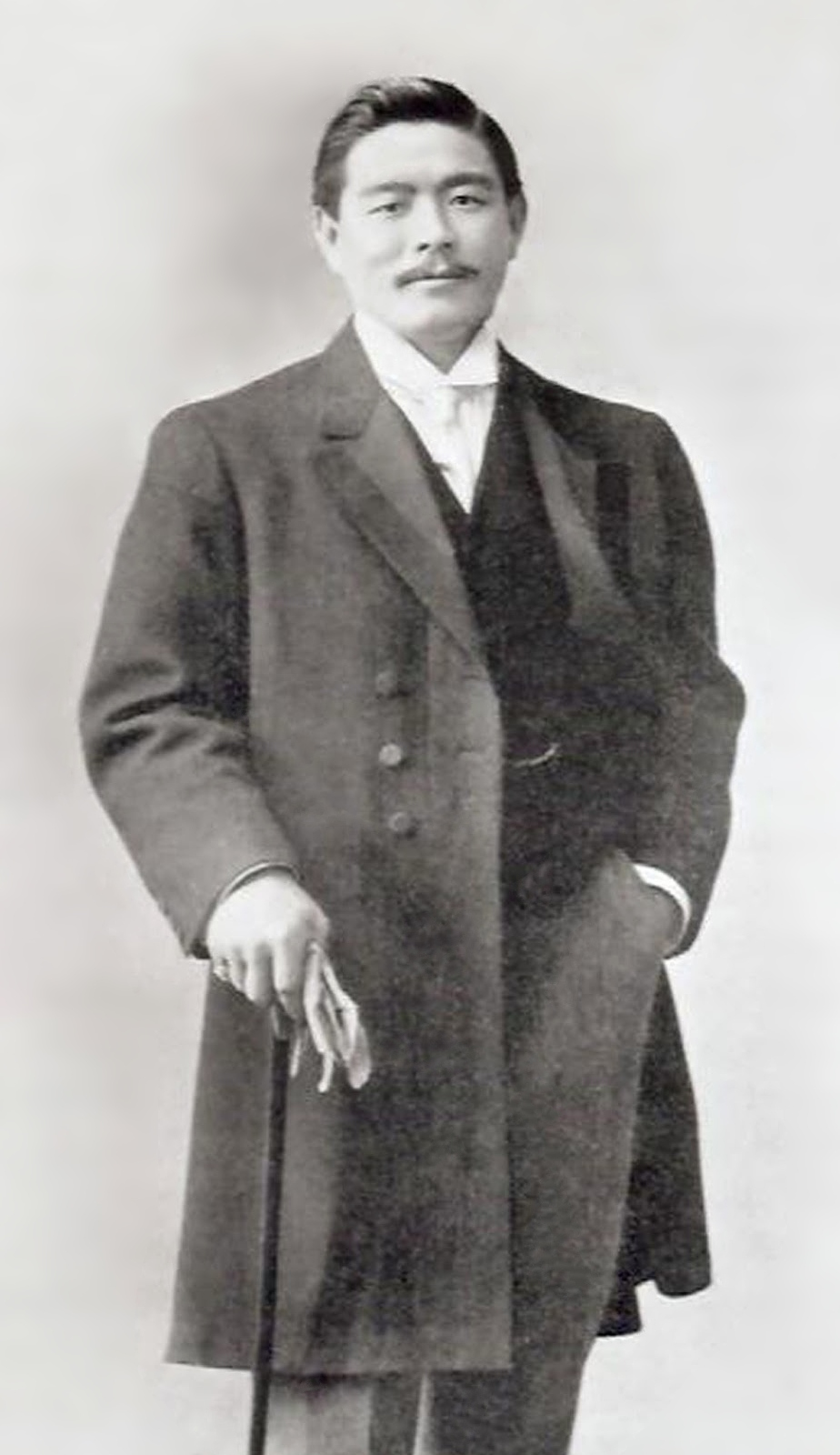
- Maeda c. 1910
- Born: November 18, 1878; Hirosaki, Aomori, Japan
- Died: November 28, 1941 (aged 63); Belém, Pará, Brazil
- Other names: Otávio Maeda
- Citizenship: Brazil (naturalized); Japan (expatriate)
- Height: 164 cm (5 ft 5 in)
- Style: Judo
- Teachers: Kano Jigoro; Tomita Tsunejirō
- Rank: 7th dan red and white belt in Judo

Mixed martial arts record
- Total: 7
- Wins: 7
- By knockout: 2
- By submission: 5
- Losses: 0
- Draws: 0

Other information
- Occupation: Judōka and prizefighter
- Notable students: Carlos Gracie; Luiz França

Japanese name
- Kanji: 前田 光世
- Hiragana: まえだ みつよ
- Katakana: マエダ ミツヨ
Transcriptions
- Romanization: Maeda Mitsuyo

Otávio Maeda (Note: Portuguese pronunciation: [oˈtavju maˈedɐ]) (born Mitsuyo Maeda [Japanese: 前田 光世]; November 18, 1878 – November 28, 1941) was a Japanese and Brazilian judōka, catch wrestler, and prizefighter who is considered one of the fathers of Brazilian Jiu-jitsu. He was commonly known by the nickname Conde Koma.

Maeda was the head of the second generation of Kodokan judōka, and was integral to the martial art's expansion into the United States during the 1900's. Along with Soshihiro Satake, he pioneered judo in Brazil, the United Kingdom, and other countries during the following decades, eventually becoming a naturalized Brazilian citizen and a promoter of Japanese immigration to Brazil.

Maeda was fundamental to the development of Brazilian jiu-jitsu, including through his teaching of Carlos Gracie and others of the Gracie family. His accomplishments led to him being called the "toughest man who ever lived".

== Biography ==
Maeda was born in Funazawa Village, Hirosaki City, Aomori Prefecture, Japan, on November 18, 1878. He attended Kenritsu Itiu high school (currently Hirokou—a Hirosaki school). As a child, he was known as Hideyo. He practiced sumo as a teenager, but lacked the ideal build for the sport. In 1894, at seventeen years of age, his parents sent him to Tokyo to enroll in Waseda University. He joined the Kodokan Judo Institute the following year.

=== Formative years at the Kodokan ===
Arriving in the Kodokan, Maeda, who was 164 centimetres (5 ft 4 1/2 in) tall and weighed 64 kilograms (141 lb; 10 st 1 lb), was confused with a delivery boy due to his country manners and demeanor. He was spotted by judo's founder Kano Jigoro, and assigned to Tsunejiro Tomita (4th dan at the time), the smallest of the teachers of the Kodokan's "Four Heavenly Kings" (Shitennō), to illustrate that in judo size is not important. Tomita was the first Kodokan judoka and a close friend of Kano. According to Koyasu Masao (9th dan):

Among the four Kodokan shiten-no, it was Tomita who received the greatest amount of teachings from Kano Jigoro sensei ... as a fighter he wasn't so successful as Saigo, Yamashita and Yokoyama, but was exceptional in applied studies and was also fluent in the English language ...

Although the weakest of Kodokan Shitennō, Tomita was able to defeat the great jujutsu champion of that time, Hansuke Nakamura.

With Soishiro Satake, Maeda formed the head of the second generation of Kodokan judoka, which had replaced the first by the beginning of the 20th century. Satake, at 175 cm and 80 kg, was unmatched in amateur sumo but admitted that he himself was not able to match Maeda in judo. Satake would later travel to South America with Maeda and settle in Manaus, Amazonas, while Maeda continued traveling. Satake would become the founder, in 1914, of the first historically registered judo academy in Brazil. He and Maeda are considered the pioneers of judo in Brazil.

At that time, there were few graduated Kodokan judoka. Maeda and Satake were the top graduated professors at Waseda University, both sandan (3rd dan), along with Matsuhiro Ritaro (nidan or 2nd dan) and six other shodan (1st dan). Kyuzo Mifune registered at the Kodokan in 1903 and attracted the attention of Maeda, who commented, "you are strong and competent, therefore, you will certainly leave your mark in the Kodokan ..." Mifune went to learn under Sakujiro Yokoyama and later, already a celebrated judoka, Mifune said that Maeda's words were a great incentive, as he regarded Maeda with the greatest admiration, even though Yokoyama was his sensei (instructor).

According to Mifune, in 1904 Maeda lost to Yoshitake Yoshio by hane goshi, after defeating three adversaries in succession, but in a following tsukinami-shiai defeated eight adversaries in a row and was awarded the rank of 4th dan (yondan). Mifune also states that Maeda was one of the most vigorous promoters of judo, although not by teaching the art, instead generating recognition of judo through his many combats with contenders from other disciplines. Maeda treated experienced and inexperienced students alike, throwing them as if in real combat. He reasoned that this behavior was a measure of respect towards his students, but it was often misunderstood and frightened many youngsters, who would abandon him in favor of other professors.

=== Prelude to Kodokan's expansion ===
In 1879, Ulysses S. Grant, the former president of the United States, visited Japan. While in Tokyo, he attended a jujutsu presentation at Shibusawa Eiichi's home in Asukayama. Kano Jigoro was one of the jujutsuka present. At that time, jujutsu was just starting to become known in Europe and the Americas. Excepting literal circus acts, few non-Japanese had much chance of seeing or learning about the art. Even in Japan, judo and jujutsu were not considered separate disciplines at that time. Indeed, it was not until 1925 that there started to be clear differentiation of the names in Japan, and outside Japan, judo and jujutsu were not completely separated until the 1950s.

In 1903, a senior Kodokan instructor named Yamashita Yoshitsugu traveled to the United States at the request of the Seattle businessman Sam Hill. In Washington, DC, Yamashita's students included Theodore Roosevelt and other prominent Americans. At Roosevelt's request, Yamashita also taught judo at the U.S. Naval Academy. Capitalizing on the publicity, the Japanese Legation to the United States asked the Kodokan to send more judo teachers to America, providing continuity to Yamashita's work. Tomita reluctantly accepted the task; Maeda and Satake embraced the opportunity.

=== Career ===
==== United States ====
Tomita, Maeda, and Satake sailed from Yokohama on November 16, 1904, and arrived in New York City on December 8, 1904.

Early in 1905, Tomita and Maeda gave several public demonstrations of judo. On February 17, 1905, Tomita and Maeda gave a demonstration at Princeton University when Maeda threw N.B. Tooker, a Princeton football player, while Tomita threw Samuel Feagles, the Princeton gymnasium instructor. On February 21, 1905, they gave a judo demonstration at the United States Military Academy at West Point, where Tomita and Maeda performed kata (patterns)—nage-no, koshiki, ju-no, and so on. At the request of the crowd, Maeda wrestled a cadet and threw him easily. Because Tomita had been the thrower in the kata, the cadets wanted to wrestle him too. Tomita threw the first (Charles Daly) without any trouble. However, Tomita twice failed to throw another football player named Tipton using Tomoe nage. Afterwards, the New York sportswriters claimed the victory for the cadets because Tomita was thrown, whereas the Japanese embassy staff proclaimed that Tomita had achieved a moral victory, on the grounds that he was a far smaller man.

A conflicting account provided by The New York Times on February 21, referring to Tomita as "Prof. Tomet," states that

The professor [Tomita] wrestled with his assistant, throwing him around like a rubber ball. He then called for cadet volunteers. Cadet Tipton, the husky All-American football centre, went on the mat and football methods soon had jiu-jitsu beaten. The big fellow pinned the wiry Jap flat on his back three times without being thrown in the bout. Cadet Daly also threw the professor.

In any event, later that year the U.S. Military Academy hired a former world champion professional wrestler, Tom Jenkins, instead of a judo teacher, a job Jenkins kept until his retirement in 1942.

The Japanese experts did better at the New York Athletic Club on March 8, 1905: "Their best throw was a sort of flying cartwheel," said an article in The New York Times, describing Maeda's match with John Naething, a 200 lb wrestler. "Because of the difference in methods the two men rolled about the mat like schoolboys in a rough-and-tumble fight. After fifteen minutes of wrestling, Maeda secured the first fall. Ultimately, however, Naething was awarded the match by pin fall." On March 21, 1905, Tomita and Maeda gave a "jiu-do" demonstration at Columbia University attended by about 200 people. Following introductions, Tomita demonstrated falls and throws, then Maeda threw the university's wrestling instructor. According to the student newspaper, "Another interesting feature was the exhibition of some of the obsolete jiu jitsu tricks for defense with a fan against an opponent armed with the curved Japanese sword." Translations were provided by chemist Jōkichi Takamine.

During April 1905, Tomita and Maeda started a judo club in a commercial space at 1947 Broadway in New York. Members of this club included Japanese expatriates, plus a European American woman named Wilma Berger. On July 6, 1905, Tomita and Maeda gave a judo exhibition at the YMCA in Newport, Rhode Island. On September 30, 1905, they gave a demonstration at another YMCA in Lockport, New York. In Lockport, the local opponent was Mason Shimer, who wrestled Tomita unsuccessfully.

On November 6, 1905, Maeda was reported visiting professional wrestler Akitaro Ono in Asheville, North Carolina; after this, Maeda was no longer routinely associated with Tomita in the U.S. newspapers. On December 18, 1905, Maeda was in Atlanta, Georgia for a professional wrestling match with Sam Marburger. The contest was best of three, two falls with jackets and one without, and Maeda won the two with jackets and lost the one without. According to the Atlanta papers, Maeda listed his residence as the YMCA in Selma, Alabama.

==== Cuba, Mexico, and Central America ====
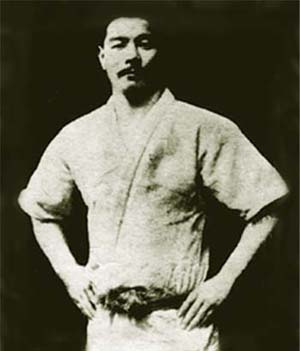
Maeda in Cuba

In 1908, Maeda toured Spain with Sadakazu Uyenishi. Around this time, he earned the nickname "Conde Koma" (literally "Count Combat" in Spanish and Portuguese). According to the Japanese National Diet Library:

When Maeda visited Barcelona, he saw an advertisement for a lecture given by a man calling himself the "Japanese judo champion", who was the man who he had known had not sufficient skill to call themself the champion at all. He decided to offer a challenge to the man under a false name to teach him a lesson so that he should not refuse to accept the challenge if he knew the challenger was Maeda. When he had difficulty hitting upon a good name, he first thought of the name, "Komaru Maeda" from the Japanese word "Komaru" which means "to be in difficultly" as he was in financial difficulty at the time, and at last he decided to take up "Koma" alone from "Komaru" and to add "Conde" which means "count" in Spanish in front of it. Thus his nickname, "Conde Koma" was given birth. He offered a challenge under the name "Conde Koma", but his opponent soon found the challenger was Maeda and called off the bout.

During November 1908, Maeda went to Paris, France, apparently to see his friend Akitaro Ono. From Paris, he went to Havana, arriving there on December 14, 1908, and his twice-a-day wrestling act quickly proved to be very popular. On July 23, 1909, Maeda left Havana for Mexico City. His debut in Mexico City took place at the Virginia Fabregas Theater on July 14, 1909. This show was a private demonstration for some military cadets. Shortly afterwards, Maeda began appearing at the Principal Theater. In a similar fashion to how the jujutsu pioneers in Europe did things, Maeda put on “all comers” matches against anyone willing to test their luck on stage. His standing offer was 100 pesos (US$50) to anyone he could not throw, and 500 pesos (US$250) to anyone who could throw him.

During September 1909, a Japanese calling himself Nobu Taka arrived in Mexico City for the purpose of challenging Maeda for what the Mexican Herald said would be the world jujutsu championship. After several months of public wrangling, Taka and Maeda met at the Colon Theater on November 16, 1909; Taka won. There was an immediate rematch, and four days later, Maeda was pronounced the champion.

In January 1910, Maeda took part in a wrestling tournament in Mexico City. During the semifinals, Maeda drew with Hjalmar Lundin. This is a different result than Lundin recalled in his 1937 memoirs. Said Lundin, "Having been accustomed to handling the big Greco-Roman wrestlers with ease, the Jap thought he could do likewise with me, but in the first encounter I got the better of him, after which my confidence returned. I had no trouble then in winning the match. It was a surprise to the crowd and a set-back for Koma. He had been the hero all week, but as soon as he was beaten the fans, true to form, called him a bum."

In July 1910, Maeda returned to Cuba, where he tried to arrange matches with Frank Gotch and Jack Johnson. The Americans ignored him—there was no money to be made wrestling him, and much money to be lost if they lost to him. On August 23, 1910, Maeda wrestled Jack Connell in Havana; the result was a draw. During 1911, Maeda and Satake were joined in Cuba by Akitaro Ono and Tokugoro Ito. The four men were known as the 'Four Kings of Cuba.'

The Four Kings were very popular in Cuba, and the Japanese media were proud of the reputation they were bringing to judo and Japan. Consequently, on January 8, 1912, the Kodokan promoted Maeda to 5th dan. There was some resistance to this decision because there were those in Japan who did not approve of his involvement in professional wrestling. In 1913, Tokugoro Ito stayed in Cuba while Maeda and Satake went to El Salvador, Costa Rica, Honduras, Panama, Colombia, Ecuador and Peru. In El Salvador, the president was assassinated while Maeda was there, and in Panama, the Americans tried to pay him to lose; in response, they kept moving south. In Peru they met Laku, a Japanese jujutsuka who taught the military, and invited him to join them. They were then joined by Okura in Chile, and by Shimitsu in Argentina. The troupe arrived in Brazil before September 1914.

==== Brazil ====
According to the newspaper Correio Paulistano, Maeda did a Judo demonstration at Teatro Variedades, Largo do Paissandu, Santos on September 24, 1914. According to a copy of Maeda's passport provided by Gotta Tsutsumi, head of Belém's Associação Paramazônica Nipako, Maeda arrived in Porto Alegre on November 14, 1914.

On December 20, 1915, the first demonstration in Belém took place at the Theatro Politheama. The O Tempo newspaper announced the event, stating that Conde Koma would show the main jiu-jitsu techniques, excepting the prohibited ones. He also would demonstrate self-defense techniques. After that, the troupe would be accepting challenges from the crowd, and there would be the first sensational match of jiu-jitsu between Shimitsu (champion of Argentina) and Laku (Peruvian military professor). On December 22, 1915, according to O Tempo, jiu-jitsu world champion Maeda, head of the Japanese troupe, and Satake, New York champion, performed an enthusiastic and sensational jiu-jitsu match. On the same day, Nagib Assef, an Australian Greco-Roman wrestling champion of Turkish origin, challenged Maeda. On December 24, 1915, Maeda defeated in seconds the boxer Barbadiano Adolpho Corbiniano, who became one of his disciples. On January 3, 1916, at Theatro Politheama, Maeda finally fought Nagib Assef, who was thrown off the stage and pinned into submission by arm-lock. On January 8, 1916, Maeda, Okura, and Shimitsu boarded the SS Antony and left for Liverpool. Tokugoro Ito went to Los Angeles. Satake and Laku stayed in Manaus teaching, according to O Tempo, jiu-jitsu. After 15 years together, Maeda and Satake had finally split up.

At some point, Maeda became a naturalized Brazilian citizen, adopting the Portuguese given name Otávio (Portuguese pronunciation: [oˈtavju]).

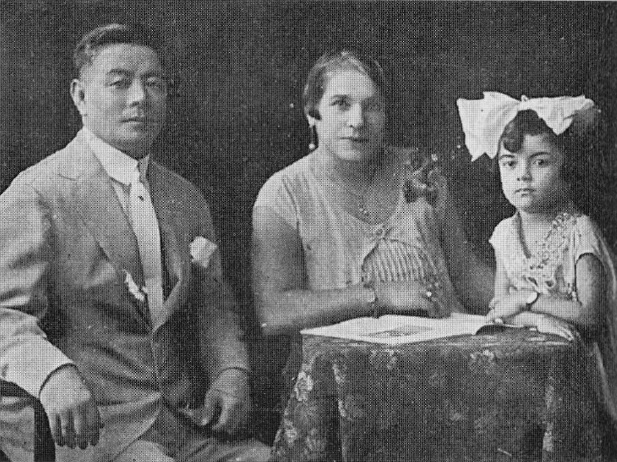
Maeda and his family in Brazil

Maeda was still popular in Brazil, and recognized as a great fighter, although he only fought sporadically after his return. Around 1918–1919, Maeda accepted a challenge from the famous capoeirista Pé de Bola. Maeda allowed Pé de Bola to use a knife in the fight. The capoeirista was 190 cm tall and weighed 100 kg. Maeda won the match quickly. In 1921, Maeda founded his first judo academy in Brazil. It was called Clube Remo' and its building was a 4m x 4m shed. Later, it was moved to the Fire Brigade headquarters and then to the church of N.S. de Aparecida. In 1991, the academy was located in the SESI and was run by Alfredo Mendes Coimbra, of the third generation of Conde Koma's descendants.

On September 18, 1921, Maeda, Satake, and Okura were briefly in New York City. They were aboard the Booth Line steamship SS Polycarp. All three men listed their occupations as professors of "juitso". After leaving New York, the three men went to the Caribbean, where they stayed from September to December 1921. At some point in this trip, Maeda was joined by his wife. In Havana, Satake and Maeda took part in some contests. Their opponents included Paul Alvarez, who wrestled as Espanol Icognito. Alvarez defeated Satake and Yako Okura—the latter being billed as a former instructor at the Chilean Naval Academy—before being himself beaten by Maeda. Maeda also defeated a Cuban boxer called Jose Ibarra, and a French wrestler called Fournier. The Havana papers attributed Maeda with a Cuban student called Conde Chenard.

=== Later years ===
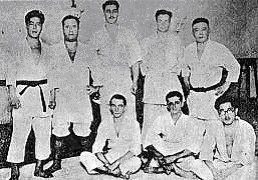
Maeda's first Brazilian students

In 1925, Maeda became involved with helping settle Japanese immigrants near Tome-açú, a Japanese-owned company town in Pará, Brazil. This was part of a large tract in the Amazon forest set aside for Japanese settlement by the Brazilian government. The crops grown by the Japanese were not popular with the Brazilians, and the Japanese investors eventually gave up on the project. Maeda also continued teaching judo, now mostly to the children of Japanese immigrants. Consequently, in 1929, the Kodokan promoted him to 6th dan, and on November 27, 1941, to 7th dan. Maeda never knew of this final promotion, because he died in Belém on November 28, 1941. The cause of death was kidney disease.

In May 1956, a memorial to Maeda was erected in Hirosaki City, Japan. The dedication ceremony was attended by Risei Kano and Kaichiro Samura.

== Influence on the creation of Brazilian jiu jitsu ==
Gastão Gracie was a business partner of the American Circus in Belém. In 1916, Italian-Argentine circus Queirolo Brothers staged shows there and presented Maeda. In 1917, Carlos Gracie, the 14‑year-old son of Gastão Gracie, watched a demonstration by Maeda at the Da Paz Theatre and decided to learn judo. Maeda accepted Gracie and Luiz França as students, and the youth became a great exponent of the art and ultimately, with his younger brother Hélio Gracie, founded Gracie Jiu-Jitsu, modern Brazilian jiu-jitsu. In 1921, Gastão Gracie and his family moved to Rio de Janeiro. Carlos, then 17 years old, passed Maeda's teachings on to his brothers Osvaldo, Gastão, and Jorge. Carlos and Hélio are considered the founders of Brazilian Jiu-Jitsu.

== Maeda's philosophy of combat ==
According to Renzo Gracie's book Mastering Jujitsu, Maeda not only taught the art of judo (also known as "Kano-ryu jiu-jutsu" at the time) to Carlos Gracie, but also taught a particular philosophy about the nature of combat based on his travels competing and training alongside Newaza specialized jujutsukas like Sadakazu Uyenishi, Taro Miyake, catch-wrestlers, boxers, savate fighters, and various other martial artists. The book details Maeda's theory - one common amongst the jujutsu pioneers in London and also common in boxing vs grappling matches that were popular in the 1800s- that physical combat could be broken down into distinct phases, such as the striking phase, the grappling phase, the ground phase, and so on. Thus, it was a smart fighter's task to keep the fight located in the phase of combat that best suited his own strengths. The book further states that this theory was a fundamental influence on the Gracie approach to combat. The approach included armed versus armed, armed versus unarmed, unarmed, standing (tachiwaza, 立ち技), kneeling (suwariwaza, 座技), and ground work (newaza, 寝技), close quarters (hakuheijugi, 白兵主義), and other forms of combat. It was employed by other proponents of judo who, like Maeda, engaged in challenge matches fighting overseas as jiu-jutsu and judo spread internationally (e.g., Yukio Tani and Taro Miyake in the United Kingdom from 1900/1904, Mikonosuke Kawaishi in France, and others).

== Fight record ==
Professional record breakdown
| 7 matches | 7 wins | 0 losses |
| By knockout | 0 | 0 |
| By submission | 6 | 0 |
| By decision | 1 | 0 |
| Draws | 0 | |

Fight record
7 wins (1 (T)KOs, 6 Submissions), 0 losses, 0 draws
| Date | Result | Opponent | Location | Method | Time | Record |
| May 10, 1915 | Win | (Brazil) Paulo Jeolas | | Submission | | 1–0–0 |
| May 13, 1915 | Win | (Brazil) Joaquim Gaudencio Alves | | Submission (Heel Hook) | 2:15 R2 | 2–0–0 |
| May 21, 1915 | Win | (Brazil) Benjamin Constant Azevedo | | Submission | | 3–0–0 |
| December 15, 1915 | Win | (Brazil) Barbadiano Adolpho Corbiniano | | Submission | | 4–0–0 |
| January 3, 1916 | Win | (Brazil) Nagib Assef | | Submission (Armbar) | | 5–0–0 |
| December 1, 1916 | Win | (France) Alfred Leconte | | Decision | | 6–0–0 |
| June 1, 1919 | Win | (Brazil) Pé de Bola | | Submission (Leg Lock) | | 7–0–0 |
Legend: Win Loss Draw/No contest Exhibition Notes

== Cited sources ==
Virgílio, Stanlei (2002). Conde Koma – O invencível yondan da história (in Portuguese). Editora Átomo. ISBN 85-87585-24-X.
