= Carlos Gracie =

Brazilian Jiu-Jitsu practitioner (1902–1994)

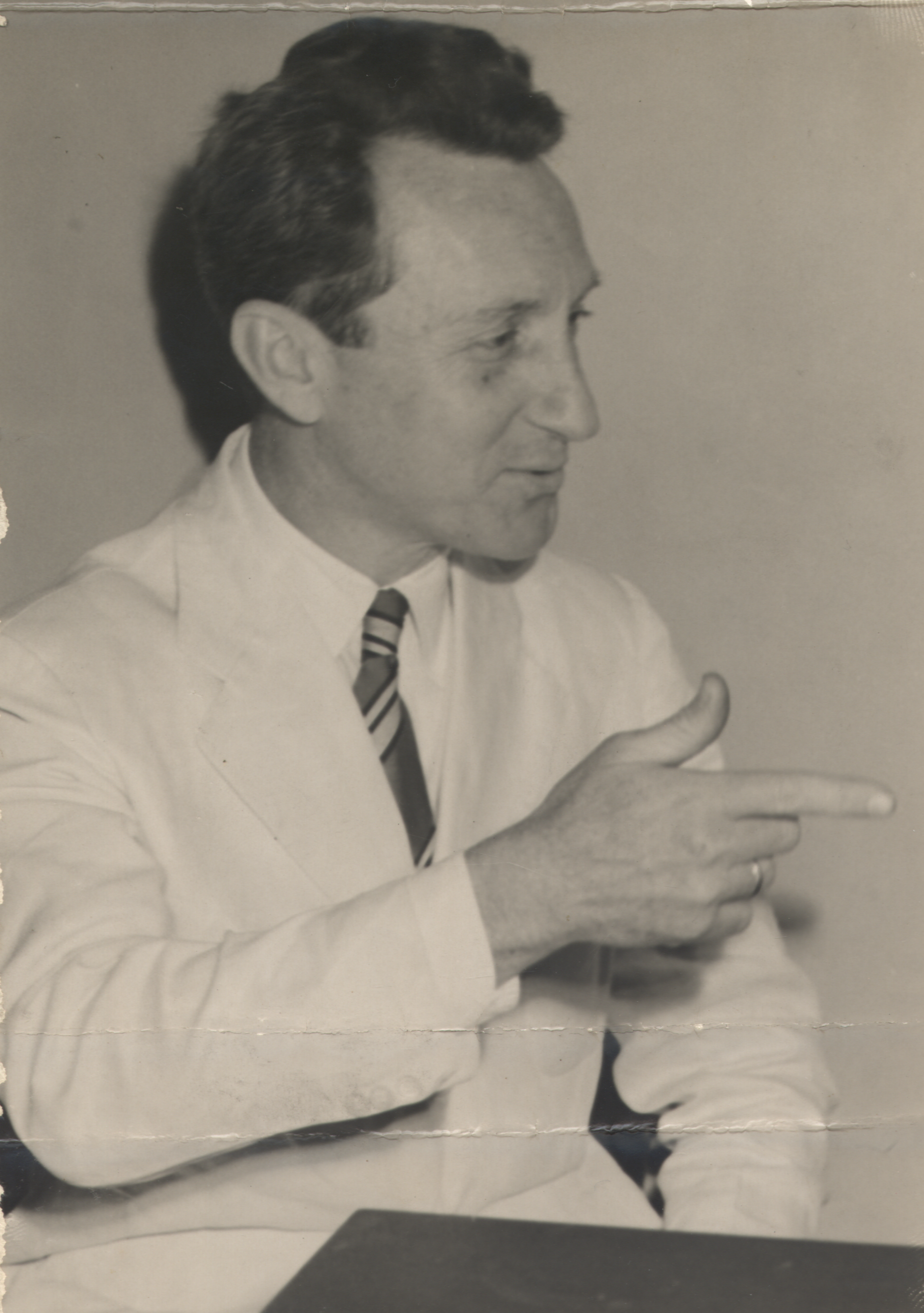
- Gracie in 1951
- Born: September 14, 1902; Belém do Pará, Brazil
- Died: October 7, 1994 (aged 92); Petrópolis, Brazil
- Style: Gracie Jiu-Jitsu, Brazilian Jiu-Jitsu, Judo
- Teachers: Mitsuyo Maeda; Jacyntho Ferro; Donato Pires dos Reis
- Rank: 10th deg. BJJ red belt (Grandmaster), Black belt Judo

Carlos Gracie (September 14, 1902 – October 7, 1994) was a Brazilian martial artist who is credited with being one of the primary developers of Brazilian jiu-jitsu. Along with his younger brother Hélio Gracie and fellow students Luis França and Oswaldo Fadda, he helped develop Brazilian jiu-jitsu based on the teachings of famed Japanese judōka Mitsuyo Maeda in Kano Jujitsu (Judo) and is widely considered to be the martial-arts patriarch of the Gracie family.

He purportedly acquired his initial knowledge of Jujitsu by studying in Belem under Maeda and his students. As he taught the techniques to his brothers, he created a martial arts family with Hélio and with other members of the Gracie family who provided key contributions to the style and development, eventually creating their own self defence system named Gracie jiu-jitsu. Gracie jiu-jitsu is distinct from its indirect predecessor jujutsu, focusing primarily on the grappling techniques while downplaying the striking elements common among older schools of Japanese jujitsu.

== Biography ==
=== Early career ===
Carlos was born in Belém in 1902, the first of eight children. He was a mischievous, aggressive child, prone to getting involved in brawls and getting expelled from schools. When Carlos was 15 years old, hoping to find a way for him to vent his aggression, his father Gastão took him to a professional wrestling challenge hosted in the circus he owned, where Carlos witnessed how the judoka Mitsuyo Maeda defeated a much bigger man. Impressed by the feat, he allegedly started taking classes under Maeda and his assistant Jacyntho Ferro, albeit for a short time, as his family moved to Rio de Janeiro for economic reasons.

There, Gracie started working as a bouncer in his father's casino until a falling out between them, and after some other jobs he became a pupil of Donato Pires dos Reis, a police hand-to-hand instructor and apprentice to Maeda. Under him, Carlos had his first formal training, learning especially self-defense-oriented techniques.

He started his career on the rings by challenging judoka Geo Omori in São Paulo in 1929, although he was initially rejected due to Carlos's lack of training and experience. They eventually faced off in two exhibitions (non-competitive matches) of "jiu-jitsu" (judo and jiu-jitsu were terms used interchangeably at the time in Brazil) staged as a favor to Carlos's father for the Municipal Guard in January 1930.

Afterwards, Carlos and his brother George founded a small school in the city's Perdizes neighborhood, where they brought in Omori to teach them further jiu-jitsu. Gracie claimed to have faced several "no holds barred" challenges in his school by this time. However, after Carlos was arrested and jailed for assault on three men who had supposedly insulted his girlfriend, the two brothers had to move back to Rio de Janeiro. There they joined Donato Pires's school, opened in Marquez de Abrantes in September 1930. The date of their return to Rio is both popularly and officially given as 1925, but sources of the time place it in the mentioned year.

=== Association with Donato Pires ===
During this time, aside from both teaching and learning jiu-jitsu under Pires, Gracie dedicated himself to participate in unsanctioned prizefights in small bars, to promote cockfighting, and to experiment on nutrition and dietary habits. He would claim in 1981 to have competed in amateur boxing with a 20-0 record during this time, while his daughter Reila Gracie cited him as a national middleweight champion, but there is no record for those claims. In June 1931, Pires moved to Santa Catarina due to his job in the Ministry of the Economy, leaving his academy in Gracie's hands.

Aside from martial arts, Gracie was also interested in alternative medicine and occultism due to the early death of his first girlfriend because of illness. He started working as a spiritual consultant to Bank of Brazil executive Oscar Santa Maria, a member of the Brazilian Rosacrucian Society, in which Carlos was deemed as having "strong mediumnic powers." In exchange for funding his academy and other ventures, Carlos would put Santa Maria in contact with a supposedly Peruvian spirit named Egidio Lasjovino. Gracie was also a follower of Helena Blavatsky's theosophy.

On July 3, 1931, Gracie and Jayme Ferreira celebrated a challenge event between three jiu-jitsu fighters from his academy and three capoeira fighters trained by Ferreira, echoing a street fight Carlos supposedly had years before with a capoeirista named Samuel. The challenge forced the fighters to wear judogis and forbade strikes on the ground, which caused one of the capoeiristas, Coronel, to be disqualified upon hitting George Gracie. In the other two matches, Oswaldo Gracie and Benedicto Peres defeated their opponents. The event was negatively received, however, not only due to a ruleset perceived as too favorable to the jiu-jitsu side, but also to accusations that Ferreira (a Greco-Roman wrestling teacher associated to Gracie) was not a capoeira master and therefore his side could not represent the art.

=== Conflict with Manoel Rufino dos Santos ===
Famous professional wrestler and sportsman Manoel Rufino dos Santos criticized further the Gracie family, so a fight was stipulated for August 22, 1931 between him and Carlos Gracie himself to settle it down. In response to the announcement, Carlos's teacher Donato Pires said through the press that Gracie's claims to be a direct apprentice to Mitsuyo Maeda were false and thus was equally unfit to represent jiu-jitsu. This almost caused the fight to be delayed when Carlos and his brothers assaulted Donato in front of the America Hotel in Catete one day before the event. By this incident, ties to Pires were severed and the Marquez de Abrantes academy became fully a property of Gracie.

The match, which was the only professional bout in Carlos's life, finally took place on the promised day. During the first two five-minute rounds, Rufino dominated the bout, forcing Carlos to defend from his guard and at one point even hit illegal strikes that were admonished by the referee. At the third, Rufino passed his guard and locked a submission hold, which Gracie avoided by diving out of the ring through the ropes. The referee stopped the fight and ordered the match to be restarted on the center of the ring, but Carlos locked a guillotine choke in the process, causing turmoil. Carlos claimed Rufino had tapped out while his opponent denied it, so the judges deliberated for some time and decided to solve the argument by restarting the match. However, Carlos refused to fight, insisting he had already won, and thus Rufino was declared winner.

The conflict then moved to the newspapers, where Rufino criticized Carlos's skill and dismissed his jiu-jitsu credentials, leading Carlos, George and Hélio to assault him in front of his teaching place at the Tijuca Tênis Clube on October 18. They hit him repeatedly with a steel box and immobilized him for Carlos to apply an armlock, dislocating Rufino's shoulder so badly that it needed surgery. This time the brothers were arrested and were convicted to two years and a half in prison for assault, as well as for trying to run away during the arrest, but their connections to President of Brazil Getúlio Vargas granted them a pardon.

=== Retirement ===
The same year, Carlos retired from competition and focused on teaching and managing his brothers. After moving to Fortaleza, he started teaching jiu-jitsu in the national police while he researched in the Gracie Diet. He also became a real estate investor.

In 1948, he published his book Introdução ao Jiu-jitsu, which was mostly a nutrition and philosophy manual despite its title.

== Judo and Brazilian/Gracie Jiu-Jitsu ==
Carlos Gracie Jiu Jitsu developed in Brazil in the early 1900s using techniques learned from the great Japanese Judo champion, Mitsuyo Maeda (known in Brazil as Conde Koma—the "Count of Combat"). Maeda, who was taught by Jigoro Kano, the creator of Judo, fought hundreds of victorious challenge matches against practitioners of other styles using his Judo techniques to overcome them. Maeda had become a champion Judoka in Japan and was so highly revered by Kano he was sent around the world to spread Judo, alongside other fellow talented Judoka.

According to reports, the young Carlos Gracie refined his system by fighting in matches that were open to all skill levels and learning from those experiences to make Jiu Jitsu more effective. Some reports claim that he advertised in newspapers and on street corners for new opponents upon whom to practice but no documented records of this exist. Carlos Gracie claimed to have fought anyone and everyone who was willing, regardless of size, weight, or fighting style. Later, his claims were challenged by his brother George Gracie, who stated; "My brother Carlos is nothing when it comes to fighting. Carlos does not have the authority nor the competence to speak about Jiu Jitsu… Who created the sporting tradition of my family if not me, in all honesty, with my career?"

This tradition of open challenge is a part of the heritage of Gracie style of Jiu Jitsu. After Carlos retired from the ring, he managed the fight careers of his brothers and sons, continuing to challenge fighters of all styles throughout the world. This tradition of open challenge is continued by his sons, grandsons, brothers, nephews, and students.

== Gracie diet ==
Carlos Gracie copied and adapted a nutritional regimen, from the Argentine-French naturist Juan Esteve Dulin, and is now marketed as the Gracie Diet. Following the Hippocratean maxim "Let your food be your remedy", Carlos aimed this diet to a system that would primarily prevent illness on days of competition. The basic principle of the Gracie Diet is to keep blood pH level neutral by consuming only compatible nutrients at each meal. The Gracie Diet is flexible but it definitely recommends a vegetarian diet and adopts abstinence from alcohol and tobacco and sugar. He also recommended the use of herbal infusions for various health conditions.

== Personal life ==
Carlos Gracie fathered 21 children, 13 of whom earned the rank of black belt in Brazilian Jiu-Jitsu. At the time of his death, Carlos Gracie had twenty-one children, one hundred and six grandchildren, and one hundred and twenty-eight great-grandchildren.

In 2009, Carlos's daughter Reila Gracie (mother of Roger Gracie) published a biography, Carlos Gracie – O Criador De Uma Dinastia; its English translation is titled Carlos Gracie: The Creator of a Dynasty.

== Documentary ==
On July 6, 2023, it was announced that ESPN Films is producing a documentary series on the Gracie family directed by Chris Fuller and produced by Greg O'Connor and Guy Ritchie.

== Instructor lineage ==
Kanō Jigorō → Mitsuyo "Count Koma" Maeda Jaycentho Ferro → Donato Pires Dos Reis → Carlos Gracie Sr.

== See also ==
- Gracie family
- List of Brazilian Jiu-Jitsu practitioners
