= Laurence Cousin =

Brazilian jiu-jitsu practitioner from France (born 1981)

Laurence Cousin Fouillat
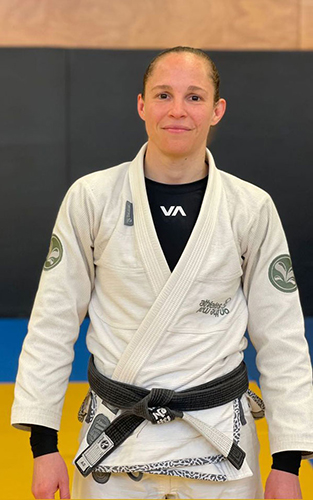
- Born: Laurence Cousin; 7 August 1981 (age 45)
- Other names: Laurence Fouillat
- Nationality: French
- Division: Gi weight classes; Featherweight; -58 kilograms (128 lb)
- Style: Brazilian Jiu-Jitsu
- Team: Six Blades Jiu-Jitsu; Acemat/Ribeiro Jiu-Jitsu; Behring Jiu Jitsu
- Trainer: Flavio Behring
- Rank: 4th deg. BJJ black belt

Other information
- Occupation: Brazilian jiu-jitsu instructor
- Website: acemat

Laurence Cousin Fouillat (born 7 August 1981) is a French submission grappler and fourth degree black belt Brazilian jiu-jitsu competitor and instructor. Considered a pioneer in the sport, Cousin is regarded as the first European female to receive a black belt in Brazilian jiu-jitsu. In 2005 she won the CBJJO World Jiu-Jitsu Cup and medalled at the IBJJF World Championship taking place in Rio de Janeiro. In 2007 Cousin became the first woman from outside Brazil to become IBJJF World jiu-jitsu champion.

== Early life ==
Laurence Cousin was born on 7 August 1981, in Saint Germain en Laye, France. From the age of eight she trained in Aikido before discovering Brazilian jiu-jitsu (BJJ) through a presentation at her dojo. Looking to train and compete, Cousin joined Europe's oldest BJJ academy Le Cercle Tessier in 1999, becoming their first and only female member. Cousin received her blue belt in 2001 then started to travel to Brazil to train and compete, receiving her purple belt from red belt Flavio Behring at the Behring academy in 2002. As a purple belt Cousin won Bronze at the 2003 World Championship competing in the purple/brown/black division. (Note: Women in purple, brown and black belts competed in the same combined division.) In the year 2004 Cousin received her brown belt and won the 2005 CBJJO World Jiu-Jitsu Cup, (Note: The Confederacao Brasileira de Jiu Jitsu Olimpico (CBJJO) was established in 2002 as an alternative to the International Brazilian Jiu-Jitsu Federation (IBJJF/CBJJ).) she then won bronze in the brown/black division (Note: Women in brown and black belts competed in the same combined division.) at the 2005 IBJJF World Championship taking place in Brazil. That same year, she was awarded her black belt by Flavio Behring during a seminar of Saulo Ribeiro.

== Black belt career ==
In 2007 Cousin switched club and started training with François Laurent, David Pierre Louis and Alain Nagera of the Sankuno Academy Paris, all the while working as a Police officer. Representing Behring Jiu Jitsu, she won gold at the 2007 IBJFF World Jiu-Jitsu Championship, taking place in Long Beach, California, beating favourite Leticia Ribeiro of Gracie Humaita in the semi-final and Sayaka Shioda in the final. Cousin became the first French and European BJJ black belt world champion, also finishing third in the Open Class category. In 2008 and 2009 Cousin competed at the FILA Grappling World Championship taking place in Fort Lauderdale, winning gold both year in the Gi and No-Gi categories. (Note: FILA became United World Wrestling in 2014.) In 2009 she won the ADCC Submission Wrestling European Championship Trials, (Note: ADCC Trials are qualifying events for the ADCC World Championship.) then finished fourth at the ADCC World Championship taking place in Barcelona (Note: The ADCC World Championship is an invitation only event taking place every two years to choose the best No-Gi grapplers in the world.) losing to Hillary Williams by points.

In 2010 following a back injury Cousin decided to step away from training and competing. Two years later, in 2012 she left Paris for Toulouse in the south of France where she established, with her husband Erwan Fouillat, her own academy Acemat. In 2013 Cousin returned to competition, winning gold at the IBJJF London International Open in the lightweight division and silver in Open Class, under team Tropa de Elite. in 2014 Cousin became a member of brothers Xande and Saulo Ribeiro BJJ team, making Acemat their first French affiliation. Competing under Acemat /Ribeiro jiu-jitsu, Cousin won double gold at the 2014 London Open International (in both her division and in Open Class) followed by gold at the 2014 European Championship.

In 2015 she won gold at the IBJJF World Master, bronze at the IBJJF European championship and competing in Sport Ju-Jitsu, gold at the JJIF Newaza No-Gi European Championships. In 2016 Cousin participated in Polaris Pro 3 in England, won silver at the 2016 European championship then won silver at the 2016 World Master IBJJF Championship in her weight class and won bronze in the Open Class. In 2017 Cousin entered the European Master Championship winning bronze in two categories, the following year she won gold in both her division and in Open Class.

In 2019 Cousin won the IBJJF World Master 2 in her weight division and silver in the Open Class as well as becoming for the second time double European Master Champion. In 2022 she became French JJIF Newaza Champion for the fourth time, that same year, competing in Ju-jitsu at the 2022 World Games she won bronze in Newaza (−57 kg) and gold in the National team competition representing France. Cousin won gold in January at the 2023 Brazilian Jiu-Jitsu European Championship competing in Master 2 featherweight division.

== Brazilian Jiu-Jitsu competitive summary ==
Main Achievements:

- IBJJF World Champion in 2007
- CBJJO World Jiu-Jitsu Cup Champion (2005 brown)
- IBJFF European Champion (2014)
- ADCC European Trials winner (2009)
- IBJJF London International Open Champion (2013 / 2014) (Note: Weight and Open class in 2014.)
- 2 x World FILA Gi Champion (2009, 2008)
- 2 x World FILA Nogi Champion (2009, 2008)
- 2nd place IBJJF World Championship (2008)
- 2nd place IBJFF European Championship (2016)
- 2nd place IBJJF London International Open Championship (2013)
- 3rd place IBJJF World Championship (2015 Black, 2005 brown, 2003 purple) (Note: purple/brown/black division in 2003.)
- 4th place ADCC Submission Fighting World Championship (2009)

== Instructor lineage ==
Cousin's jiu-jitsu instructor lineage can be traced from the Gracie brothers, the founders of the art, to Grand Master Flavio Behring (9th degree):

Mitsuyo Maeda > Carlos Gracie > Helio Gracie > Flavio Behring > Laurence Cousin
