= List of Brazilian jiu-jitsu practitioners =

This is a list of highly notable Brazilian jiu-jitsu practitioners.

== Highest graded ==
The Brazilian jiu-jitsu ranking system awards practitioners different colored belts for increasing levels of knowledge and skill. The system shares its origins with Judo but now has its own character that has become synonymous with the art, including an informality in promotional criteria and a conservative approach to promotion in general generally resulting in a longer time to reach black belt. While black belt is commonly viewed as the highest rank of attainment, a practitioner who achieves the rank of 7th degree in Brazilian jiu-jitsu is recognized by a belt of alternating red-and-black. In 2013, the International Brazilian Jiu-Jitsu Federation adopted the alternating red-and-white belt to acknowledge the achievement of 8th degree. (similar to Judo's substitution of an alternating white-and-red belt at the 6th, 7th, and 8th degree). At the 9th and 10th degree the practitioner is awarded a solid red belt, identical to Judo. These exceptional belts are awarded to denote the exceptional status of their wearer and his or her knowledge and overall contribution to the art.

The following individuals are particularly notable practitioners holding these respective ranks:

=== 10th degree (10º grau) ===

The 10th degree red belt was originally only given to the pioneers of Brazilian jiu-jitsu. There are no living 10th degree red belts

- Carlos Gracie – (Brazil, 1902–94) was taught judo by Mitsuyo Maeda, a Japanese immigrant to Brazil who was then a 4th dan Kodokan judoka. Carlos then passed the teachings on to his brothers Oswaldo, Gastão Jr., Jorge, and Hélio. In 1925, the brothers opened their first academy in Brazil, marking the beginning of Brazilian jiu-jitsu.
- Hélio Gracie – (Brazil, 1913–2009) was a Brazilian martial artist who, together with his brother Carlos Gracie, founded the martial art of Gracie jiu-jitsu, known internationally as Brazilian jiu-jitsu (BJJ). Until his death, Gracie was the only living 10th degree master of that system, and is widely considered as one of the first sports heroes in Brazilian history.
- Luiz França Filho – (Brazil, 1910–1982) was a Brazilian martial artist and one of the primary founders of Brazilian jiu-jitsu, particularly the non-Gracie lineage. Despite being a pioneer of BJJ he was never awarded with the 10th degree red belt.
- Oswaldo Fadda – (Brazil, 1920–2005), a student of França, was posthumously awarded a 10th degree red belt, and is considered one of the most important non-Gracie lineage pioneers.

=== 9th degree (9º grau) ===

- Pedro Hemeterio – The first student under master Helio Gracie to achieve the red belt, represented the Gracie Academy in many challenges and taught jiu-jitsu in São Paulo State for more than three decades. Hemeterio died in 2009.
- João Alberto Barreto – A Grand Master and one of the most important figures in the BJJ community. A red belt under Helio Gracie, he is famed for his unbeaten competitive record in the 1950s. He is the brother of GM Alvaro Barreto and GM Sergio Barreto.
- Alvaro Barreto – Grand Master Alvaro Barreto is a Brazilian jiu-jitsu red belt (9th degree) and one of the most important men in BJJ, being also the brother of GM João Alberto Barreto and GM Sergio Barreto.
- Flavio Behring – head coach of Behring Jiu-Jitsu Association, Flavio teaches seminars over the world and hold affiliated academies in Europe.
- Carlson Gracie – Son of Carlos Gracie, trainer of UFC fighters, with a very successful professional fight career.
- Carley Gracie – Son of Carlos Gracie and former Jiu-Jitsu and Vale Tudo Champion.
- Geny Rebello – Grandmaster given a commemorative tournament by the Jiu-Jitsu Federation of Rio de Janeiro
- Armando Wridt – Undefeated vale-tudo fighter who is one of only seven people to receive a red belt from Hélio Gracie
- Pedro Valente Sr. – A plastic surgeon and close friend of Hélio Gracie since 1953. In younger years took up arms to defend the former governor of the state of Rio, Leonel Brizola.
- Alexandre de Souza Neves (Mestre Chandu) - Oswaldo Fadda first black belt. Among his many achievements as a teacher and competitor, he won the fight against the Japanese Matú Sanaga in the first Carioca Jiu-Jitsu Championship in 1952
- Wilson Mattos – Perhaps the oldest student of Oswaldo Fadda.
- Luis Carlos Guedes de Castro – Another black belt under Oswaldo Fadda. Among many accomplishments as a teacher and competitor, Guedes disarmed a gangster in a crowded Rio de Janeiro train who was robbing the occupants with a pistol.
- Francisco Mansor – One of only six people to be granted a professor's diploma by Hélio Gracie. Founder of Kioto Academy.
- Rorion Gracie – One of the founders of the UFC who was instrumental in bringing No-Holds Barred Fighting to North America.
- Relson Gracie – Son of Helio Gracie and Brazilian national champion for an unprecedented 22 years. Founder of Relson Gracie gyms.
- Carlos Antonio Rosado – The only red belt to receive it from the late Carlson Gracie.
- Renato Paquet – A grandmaster who had a judo black belt and two boxing titles in addition to his red belt.
- Francisco Sá (Sazinho) – Known for his morals and honor in martial arts and in particular in Brazilian jiu-jitsu, he died in 2013 at age 77.
- Robson Gracie (also known as Carlos Robson Gracie) – President of the Jiu-Jitsu Federation of Rio de Janeiro.
- Reyson Gracie is the third son of Gracie jiu jitsu founder, Carlos Gracie who became a 9th degree red belt in the family's martial art. Reyson is regarded as the founder of Brazilian Jiu-Jitsu in the state of Amazonas, a state that became one of the most important hives in Brazil and the world for jiu jitsu. He has also had a big impact in the development of jiu jitsu in the state of Bahia.
- Rickson Gracie – The son of Hélio Gracie with an undefeated MMA career. He received his red belt on 6 July 2017, from his older brother, Rorion Gracie. He has since rejected his red belt and continues to wear his coral belt because he feels that to be legitimate the rank must come from a committee of Jiu Jitsu practitioners within an organization and not just be based on the decision of one person, in this case his older brother.
- Ricardo Murgel – Black belt 9th degree under grandmaster Flavio Behring.
- Derval Luciano Rêgo (Mestre Morcego) – Founder of the FJJ-PE (Federação de Jiu-Jitsu do Estado de Pernambuco) and co-founder of the CBJJ/IBJJF. Black belt under the lineage of Jacê Paulino de Albuquerque and Owaldo Fadda. Known for a draw match against the legendary Rolls Gracie at the end of the sixties in Rio de Janeiro.
- Marcus Soares – Black belt under Carlson Gracie, and founder of Brazilian Jiu-Jitsu in Canada.
- Paulo Mauricio Strauch - Black belt under Reylson Gracie
- Rigan Machado – Credited with 365 wins and 2 losses in Brazilian jiu-jitsu competition[39]

=== 8th degree (8º grau) ===

- Sylvio Behring – Son of Flavio Behring, father of Ian Behring. Founder/developer of the "Sistema Progressivo de Jiu Jitsu" (Progressive System), a teaching tool to help develop the foundations of Brazilian Jiu-Jitsu and self-defense for students of all levels. Among notable students is Fabrício Werdum, to whom Mestre Behring awarded a black belt.
- Romero "Jacare" Cavalcanti – Founder and head coach of Alliance Jiu Jitsu team, one of only six people promoted to black belt by Rolls Gracie.
- Luiz Fux – Current minister of the Supreme Federal Court.
- Mauricio Motta Gomes – One of only six Rolls Gracie black belts and father of multiple World Champion Roger Gracie.
- Carlos Gracie, Jr. – Founder of the International Brazilian Jiu-Jitsu Federation, the Confederation of Brazilian Jiu-Jitsu and Founder of the Brazilian Jiu-Jitsu Academy, Gracie Barra.
- Rilion Gracie – Son of Carlos Gracie
- Royler Gracie – Son of Helio Gracie who headed the Gracie Humaitá jiu-jitsu school in Rio de Janeiro. Won multiple Mundial (World), Pan-American, and ADCC championships.
- Fabricio Martins – Black belt under Osvaldo Alves Head Instructor: Equipe – Fabricio JJ and Team Fabricio JJ ( Copacabana Brazil ). Awarded his 8th degree by Osvaldo Alves in 2020.
- Joe Moreira – Pioneer of Brazilian jiu-jitsu within the United States
- Moises Muradi – Founder of Lotus Club Jiu-Jitsu, Moises started Jiu Jitsu with Professor Orlando Saraiva (Carlson Gracie black belt), where he trained up to brown belt, later trained with Otavio De Almeida (Father), where he graduated black belt, Moises is one of the most important teachers in history of the Jiu Jitsu of the city of São Paulo, he founded the first Jiu-Jitsu federation of São Paulo and also the Sports Jiu-Jitsu Confederation (CBJJE).
- Arthur Virgílio Neto – Elected mayor of Manaus and former Federal Senator.
- Sérgio Penha – Known for a match against Rickson Gracie, bypassed brown belt on his way to achieving black belt
- Pedro Sauer – Helio and Rickson Gracie black belt. US military and law enforcement trainer, once voted "Best of the Best Brazilian Jiu-Jitsu Instructors"
- Márcio Stambowsky – "Macarrão" began training at age 15 under Rolls Gracie, becoming one of the Famous Five to earn a black belt under his tutelage.
- Ricardo De La Riva
- Carlos "Caique" Elias – One of only a handful of non-Gracies to receive a black belt directly from Hélio Gracie. Received his red-and-black belt from Rickson Gracie in March 2009, followed by his 8th degree in February 2023. Former instructor at the original Gracie Humaitá and then at the Gracie Academy in California. Founder of the Caique Jiu Jitsu network of schools.

=== 7th degree (7º grau) ===

- Royce Gracie – Son of Hélio Gracie, UFC Hall of Famer. Like his brother, Rickson, Royce has rejected his coral belt and instead wears a dark blue belt, which is the traditional belt of a master instructor in Gracie Jiu-Jitsu prior to the rank structure introduced by the Jiu Jitsu federation in 1969.
- Renzo Gracie – the son of 9th degree red belt Robson Gracie.
- André Vianna – Founder of the Ookamibjj team and on-line JiuJitsubjj Magazine, a student trained by Master Oswaldo Fadda and Master Alexandre (Chandú)
- Rolker Gracie – a prominent member of the Gracie family and the fourth son of Helio Gracie. Along with his younger brother Royler Gracie he is associated with the Gracie Humaitá jiu-jitsu school.
- Sergio “Malibu” Jardim – Earned his coral belt by the hands of Rickson Gracie in 2011
- Jean Jacques Machado – Captured every major title and competition award in Brazil, has appeared in several TV shows and movies. Awarded his 8th degree in 2025.
- Fábio Santos (fighter) – Trained at Rolls Gracie Academy. Received Black Belt from Rickson Gracie and received Red and Black from Relson Gracie.
- Aloisio Silva – Black belt under Carlos Gracie founder of Dojo jiu-jitsu and Aloisio Silva BJJ. One of the first Jiu-Jitsu masters to teach women and was the first Jiu-jitsu professor to make a female jiu-jitsu black belt world champion
- Carlos Valente – Began training at 8 years old under Rolls Gracie. Received his black belt from Rickson Gracie and was awarded 7th degree from Robson Gracie in 2011.
- Ricardo De La Riva – Founder of the De La Riva guard.
- Murilo Bustamante – Retired mixed martial artist and former UFC Middleweight Champion. He is one of the founders of the Brazilian Top Team and is the current leader.
- Nelson Monteiro – Helped establish Brazilian jiu-jitsu in San Diego, California, where he was the private instructor of Sheik Tahnoon Bin Zayed Al Nayan before moving to Abu Dhabi to establish the ADCC Submission Wrestling World Championship. Awarded his 7th degree from Carlos Gracie, Jr. on 6 October 2019.
- Yvonne Duarte - Recognized as the first female Brazilian jiu-jitsu black belt. She is currently a 7th degree black belt, the highest ranked female practitioner in the world.

== Notable competitors ==

- Gordon Ryan – a five-time ADCC World champion, two-time IBJJF No-Gi World champion and a four-time Eddie Bravo Invitational champion.
- Mikey Musumeci – As a black belt he is a IBJJF World Champion (x4), IBJJF No-Gi World Champion, IBJJF European Champion (x2), IBJJF Pan-American Champion, UAEJJF Abu Dhabi World Champion and UAEJJF Abu Dhabi Grand Slam Champion
- Roberto "Cyborg" Abreu – ADCC Open Weight Champion, World No Gi Champion (x2), Pan-American Champion (x3), Grapplers Quest Open Class Champion (x7), Copa America Open Class Champion (x4), Brazilian National Champion, World Championship Medalist (x12)
- Marcus "Buchecha" Almeida – World Jiu-Jitsu Champion (x14), ADCC Champion and Pan-American Champion
- Eddie Bravo – Known for his submission victory over Royler Gracie as a brown belt in 2003. He is a black belt under Jean Jacques Machado, and the founder of 10th Planet Jiu-Jitsu, a school known for its hybrid no-gi techniques. He is the creator of the Eddie Bravo Invitational grappling competition, and the EBI ruleset.
- Keenan Cornelius – First ever to accomplish a "grand slam" in IBJJF history, having won double gold medals at four major tournaments at his belt rank.
- Mackenzie Dern – Former world No. 1 ranked IBJJF competitor in the female division. ADCC and no-gi BJJ World Champion. 3rd degree black belt under Wellington Dias.
- Megaton Dias – Competed in an unprecedented 23 consecutive World Championships and won medals on four separate occasions. Pan American Champion (x4).
- Braulio Estima – ADCC Champion (x2), Brazilian jiu-jitsu World Champion (x3), Gi and no gi Pan American Champion (x3), and European Champion (x5).
- Alexandre "Soca" Freitas – ADCC, Pan American, World Jiu Jitsu Master champion and Brazilian National champion and medalist, was a top-level super-featherweight competitor in the late 1990s and early 2000s. Established Soca BJJ.
- André Galvão – World Jiu-Jitsu Champion (x2), Pan American Champion Black Belt (x8), won World Jiu-Jitsu championships for every belt color following white, co-founder of Atos Jiu-Jitsu
- Gabi Garcia – multiple times Brazilian Jiu-Jitsu (BJJ) and ADCC world champion, and a member of the IBJJF Hall of Fame.
- Marcelo Garcia – (5x) World Jiu-Jitsu Champion, (4x) ADCC champion, (3x) Brazilian National Champion, and Pan American Champion
- Roger Gracie – World Jiu-Jitsu Champion (x14)
- Fabio Gurgel – Multiple World Championship gold medal winner.
- Rafael Lovato Jr. – First ever American to win the Brazilian National Jiu-Jitsu Championship as a black belt.
- Vinny Magalhães – Multiple World BJJ gold medalist.
- Ricardo Almeida - retired MMA fighter, 1 time Pan American Jiu-Jitsu champion, 2 time Brazilian National Jiu-Jitsu champion and former UFC Welterweight contender.He is a 4th degree black belt under Renzo Gracie.
- Robson Moura – World Jiu-Jitsu champion (x7) and Brazilian National Champion (x8)
- Pablo Popovitch – (X3) No Gi World Jiu-Jitsu Champion, (X5) Pan Am No Gi Champion, ADCC World Champion, Multiple times Grapplers Quest and N.A.G.A Champion. The only grappler to have defeated Marcelo Garcia in the under 77 kg ADCC division.
- Saulo Ribeiro – World Jiu-Jitsu Champion (x5) and ADCC Champion (x2)
- Vítor Ribeiro – Known as 'Shaolin', IBJJF World Champion (x4), IBJJF Master Worlds Champion, CBJJ Brazilian National Champion (x2), Cage Rage World Champion, Shooto World Lightweight Champion.
- Xande Ribeiro – World Jiu-Jitsu Champion (x6) and Black Belt Pan American Champion (x4)
- Garry Tonon – five-time Eddie Bravo Invitational champion, and has won titles at ADCC submission wrestling championship, IBJJF World and Pan American championships.
- Léo Vieira – ADCC Champion (x2), World Jiu Jitsu Champion, Jiu Jitsu Pan American Champion (x2), co-founder of CheckMat jiu jitsu.
- Ricardo Vieira – World Jiu Jitsu Champion (x6) for every belt color after white, Pan American Champion, co-founder of CheckMat jiu jitsu.
- Kaynan Duarte – ADCC Champion (x2), World Jiu Jitsu Champion (x2), World Jiu Jitsu No-GI Champion
- Josh Hinger – World Jiu Jitsu No-GI Champion (x3), ADCC Bronze Medalist
- Lucas Barbosa – World Jiu Jitsu Champion, World Jiu Jitsu No-GI Champion (x4), ADCC Medalist (x2)
- Tawfiq Jaunbocus - World Jiu Jitsu Champion (-70kg) (2017)

== Mixed martial artists ==
Many Mixed Martial artists are considered practitioners of Brazilian jiu-jitsu. The following Mixed Martial artists are primarily known for their strong proficiency and usage of Brazilian jiu-jitsu to achieve significant results in Mixed Martial Arts bouts.

- Royce Gracie – UFC hall of famer and pioneer of modern MMA
- B.J. Penn – MMA fighter, the first American World Jiu-Jitsu Champion in the black-belt category and former UFC Welterweight and Lightweight champion. He is a 5th degree black belt under André Perderneiras.
- Ricco Rodriguez - semi-retired MMA fighter and former UFC Heavyweight champion. He is a third degree black belt. He was the 1998 ADCC Submission Wrestling champion in the +99 kg class.
- Frank Mir - MMA fighter and former Undisputed and Interim UFC Heavyweight champion. He is a black belt under Ricardo Pires.
- Fabrício Werdum – PFL MMA fighter, 2 times ADCC World champion, 4 times World Jiu-Jitsu champion, 5 times Pan American Jiu-Jitsu champion and former UFC Heavyweight champion. He is a 2nd degree black belt under Octavio Couto.
- Glover Teixeira – Professional mixed martial artist who competes in the Light Heavyweight division currently signed under UFC and is a 2nd Degree Black Belt. Was former UFC Light Heavyweight Champion
- Murilo Bustamante - retired MMA fighter, 1 time World Jiu-Jitsu champion, 1 time Brazilian National Jiu-Jitsu champion, former Pancrase fighter, former Pride FC Middleweight and Welterweight contender and former UFC Middleweight champion. He is a 7th degree black belt under Carlson Gracie.
- Luke Rockhold - UFC fighter and former Strikeforce and UFC Middleweight champion. He is a black belt under Leandro Vieira and Dave Camarillo.
- Carlos Newton - retired MMA fighter and former UFC Welterweight champion. He is a 3rd degree IBJJF black belt.
- Pat Miletich - retired MMA fighter and former UFC Welterweight champion. He is a 3rd degree black belt under Oswaldo Alves.
- Matt Serra - retired MMA fighter, former UFC Welterweight champion and UFC Hall of famer. He is a 4th degree black belt under Renzo Gracie. He was runner up at the 2001 ADCC Submission Fighting World Championship –77 kg class.
- Benson Henderson - Bellator fighter he is a former UFC Lightweight champion. He is a black belt under John Crouch. He obtained a Bronze medal at the 2014 World IBJJF Jiu-Jitsu No-Gi Championship in the -79.5 kg class.
- Rafael Dos Anjos - UFC fighter and former UFC Lightweight champion. He is a 4th degree black belt under Aldo Januario and Philipe della Monica.
- Charles Oliveira – former UFC Lightweight Champion who is a 3rd degree black belt under Ericson Cardoso and Jorge Patino and holds the record for most submission victories in UFC history with 19
- Renan Barao - MMA fighter and former Undisputed and Interim UFC Bantamweight champion. He is a black belt under André Perderneiras.
- Antônio Rodrigo Nogueira - retired MMA fighter, 2 time Pan American Jiu-Jitsu champion, 2 time Brazilian National Jiu-Jitsu champion, former UFC Interim Heavyweight Champion, former Undisputed and Interim Pride FC Heavyweight Champion and the Rings:King Of Kings 2000 Tournament winner. He is a 5th degree black belt under Ricardo De La Riva.
- Ricardo Arona - retired MMA fighter, 3 time ADCC Submission Wrestling champion, 2 time World Jiu-Jitsu champion, former Pride FC Middleweight title contender and the Rings:King Of Kings 2001 Middleweight tournament winner. He is a 4th degree black belt.
- Ronaldo Souza – retired MMA fighter, 2 time ADCC Submission Wrestling champion, 3 time World Jiu-Jitsu champion, former UFC Middleweight and Light Heavyweight contender, and former Strikeforce Middleweight champion. He is a 4th degree black belt under Henrique Machado.
- Demian Maia – MMA fighter, 2 time World Jiu-Jitsu Champion, 1 time ADCC Submission Wrestling champion, 1 time Pan American Jiu-Jitsu champion, 1 time Brazilian National Jiu-Jitsu champion and former UFC Middleweight and Welterweight title contender who had a series of 11 undefeated fights in MMA. He is a 5th degree black belt.
- Gilbert Burns – UFC fighter, 1 time World Jiu-Jitsu champion, 2 time World No Gi Jiu-Jitsu champion, 1 time World Professional Jiu-Jitsu Cup winner and former UFC welterweight title challenger. He is a 3rd degree black belt under Rafael Barros.
- Jeff Monson - retired MMA fighter, 2 time ADCC Submission Wrestling champion, 3 time FILA Grappling World champion, 1 time IBJJF World Jiu-Jitsu champion, 1 time Pan American Jiu-Jitsu champion, former CWFC Heavyweight champion and former UFC Heavyweight title contender. He is a black belt under Ricardo Libório.
- Nick Diaz – An American professional mixed martial artist who competes in the welterweight division currently signed under UFC, black belt under Cesar Gracie.
- Nate Diaz – An American professional mixed martial artist who competes in the lightweight division currently signed under UFC and the winner of The Ultimate Fighter 5, black belt under Cesar Gracie.
- Kenny Florian – Retired UFC competitor. Co-host of UFC Tonight and UFC Now. 3rd degree black belt under Roberto Maia.
- Jake Shields - PFL fighter, Pan American Jiu-Jitsu champion, former Elite:XC Welterweight champion, former Strikeforce Middleweight champion and former UFC Welterweight title contender. He obtained a bronze medal at the 2005 ADCC Submission Fighting World Championship in the -77 kg class.
- Brian Ortega – UFC fighter who is a black belt under Rener Gracie.
- Aljamain Sterling - current UFC fighter, former UFC Bantamweight champion and former submission grappler. He is a black belt under Matt Serra.
- Deiveson Figueiredo - UFC fighter and former two-time UFC Flyweight champion.
- Brandon Moreno - UFC fighter and former two-time UFC Flyweight champion. He is a black belt under Raul Arvizu.
- Josh Barnett - MMA Fighter, professional wrestler, 2009 World No Gi BJJ Champion and former UFC Heavyweight champion. He is a second degree black belt under Erik Paulson and Rigan Machado.

== Celebrities and athletes ==
Each person listed is listed with their last known rank and coach, if either are known. The belt rankings may be out of date for some practitioners. Included in this list are also practitioners that have died. Belt rankings for deceased practitioners are of the last known rank before they died.

- Joe Rogan – an American comedian and color commentator for the UFC, black belt under Jean Jacques Machado, also a black belt under Eddie Bravo's 10th Planet Jiu-Jitsu.
- Allan Mortimer – Bahamian Track and Field athlete . He began training under Ryron Gracie and Rener Gracie in February 2013 and received his black belt in February 2017.
- Donnie Yen – Hong Kong actor and martial artist, holds a purple belt. Yen frequently showcases his BJJ skills in his films such as Flash Point and Special ID
- Henry Cavill – English actor, seen training at Roger Gracie's academy in May 2016 and February 2018.
- Charlie Hunnam – English actor, began training in 2016 under Rigan Machado and went on to receive his blue belt from him in October 2018.
- Ed O'Neill – American actor, became a black belt in Brazilian jiu jitsu after training for 16 years under Rorion Gracie.
- Tom Hardy – English actor, seen training at Roger Gracie affiliates and promoted to purple belt in June 2023.
- Maynard James Keenan – American singer and musician, trained under Rickson Gracie. Promoted to Black Belt in 2024
- Igor Cavalera – Brazilian musician (Drummer).
- Mario Lopez – American television host, began training in early 2017 and received his purple belt in November 2022 at Gracie Barra Glendale.
- Paulo Jr. – Brazilian musician.
- Zoltan Bathory – Hungarian-born American musician, BJJ and 4th Degree Judo Black Belt, National Silver Medalist, trained under Royler and Royce Gracie.
- David Mamet – American playwright, essayist, and filmmaker.
- Sean Patrick Flanery – American actor and singer who has Pan-American and American National Championship wins in BJJ, currently an instructor and black belt.
- Dave Bautista – American professional wrestler and actor, brown belt under Cesar Gracie.
- Mel Gibson – American actor, studied under Rorion Gracie. He was also seen training with Carlos Machado in February 2018.
- Chuck Norris – American actor, martial artist, and Air Force veteran. Holds a 3rd degree black belt under Rigan Machado, as well as a black belt or higher rank in five other martial arts.
- Paul Walker – American actor, held a brown belt and was posthumously promoted to black belt by his instructor Ricardo "Franjinha" Miller.
- Sam Harris – American author, podcast host, and neuroscientist.
- Lex Fridman – Russian-born American artificial intelligence researcher and podcast host, holds a first-degree black belt under Relson Gracie.
- Igor Rakočević – Serbian basketball player.
- Tamba Hali – Liberian-born American football player, holds a blue belt under Rener Gracie.
- Matt Heafy – Japanese-American singer and musician, holds a brown belt at Gracie Barra North Orlando under Gustavo "Gutty" Muggiati.
- Ashton Kutcher – American actor, holds a black belt under Rigan Machado.
- Scott Bessent – 79th US Secretary of the Treasury and hedge fund manager, holds a blue belt under Renzo Gracie.
- Joel Kinnaman – Swedish-American actor, holds a blue belt under Rigan Machado.
- Scott Caan – American actor and filmmaker, holds a black belt.
- Alex O'Loughlin – Australian actor, holds a purple belt.
- Demi Lovato – American singer and actress, holds a blue belt.
- Russell Peters – American comedian, holds a blue belt under Jean Jacques Machado.
- Anthony Bourdain – American celebrity chef, held a blue belt under Igor Gracie.
- Craig Pumphrey – martial arts expert.
- Wiz Khalifa – American rapper, began training in 2017 under Rigan Machado.
- Tay Melo – Brazilian professional wrestler; holds a blue belt; also holds a black belt in Judo.
- Russell Brand – English actor and comedian, holds a purple belt by Chris Cleere.
- Teri Reeves – American actress, holds a black belt.
- Clark Gregg – American actor and director, holds a black belt under Renato Magno.
- Chris Fuller – American filmmaker.
- Jonah Hill – American actor, filmmaker, and comedian.
- Harley Flanagan – Singer for Cro-Mags was an instructor at Renzo Gracie Academy
- Guy Ritchie – Film director awarded a black belt in 2015 by Renzo Gracie.
- Luciana Pedraza – Argentine actress and director, wife of the American actor Robert Duvall, holds a brown belt.
- Mark Zuckerberg – American internet entrepreneur, holds a blue belt under Dave Camarillo.
- Barry Bonds – American former MLB baseball player, holds a blue belt under Jay Janero.
- Wagner Moura – Brazilian actor, director, and filmmaker, holds a brown belt under Rigan Machado.
- Jonathan Lipnicki - American actor, holds a black belt.
- Alex Varkatzas – American musician, former lead vocalist of metalcore band Atreyu, holds a blue belt under Stephen Martinez.
- Augusto Ichisato – Brazilian, Food Engineer and Influencer, holds a black belt under Luiz Guillherme "Guigo".
