= Fábio Santos (grappler) =

Brazilian martial artist

- Born: April 4, 1956 (age 70); Rio de Janeiro, Brazil
- Style: Gracie Jiu-Jitsu
- Teachers: Rolls Gracie, Rickson Gracie
- Rank: 7th deg. BJJ red and black Coral belt

Other information
- Notable students: Dean Lister
- Website: http://www.fabiojiujitsu.com/

Fábio Santos (born April 4, 1956) is a Brazilian jiu-jitsu practitioner and instructor.

== Biography ==
Santos graduated with a BA in physical education from the Universidade Gama Filho. Upon immigrating to the United States, Santos taught in Rorion Gracie's academy in Torrance, California. He later opened his own academy in San Diego, California.

In the early UFC events, Santos can be seen ringside with the Gracie family and Pedro Sauer, most notably in UFC 3 when he entered the ring to yell at Joe Son who had been taunting the corner after a fatigued and dehydrated Royce Gracie defeated Joe's friend, Kimo Leopoldo.

Fabio Santos is featured in MMA Sports magazine, where he has a column called Jiu-Jitsu 101.

It is widely believed that Dean Lister received his black belt from Santos, since Santos was Lister's jiu-jitsu instructor up to brown belt. However, it was Santos's student Jeffrey Higgs.

== Instructor lineage ==
Kano Jigoro → Tomita Tsunejiro → Mitsuyo "Count Koma" Maeda → Carlos Gracie, Sr. → Helio Gracie → Rickson Gracie → Fábio Santos

== Awards ==
- 1996 World Jiu-Jitsu Champion
- 1996 Pan American Champion
- 1999 Gameness Champion
- 2000 World Jiu-Jitsu Champion
- 2003 Pan American Champion
- 2003 US Open- Black Belt Masters Champion
- 2004 United Gracie- Black Belt Superfight Champion
- 2005 Black Belt Pro Am- Superfight Champion

== See also ==
- List of Brazilian Jiu-Jitsu practitioners
