= Yvonne Duarte =

Brazilian jiu-jitsu practitioner and instructor (born 1963)

Yvone Duarte
- Born: 26 August 1963 (age 63)
- Division: Featherweight / Peso Pena -52 kilograms (115 lb)
- Rank: 7th deg. BJJ coral belt

Other information
- Occupation: BJJ instructor

Yvone Magalhães Duarte (born 26 August 1963 in Boa Vista, Brazil) is a 7th degree Brazilian jiu-jitsu black belt practitioner and instructor. The first woman to achieve the rank of black belt in Brazilian jiu-jitsu, Duarte is considered the martial art's foremost female pioneer. In 2021, she became the highest-ranked woman after reaching the 7th degree Coral belt.

== Biography ==
Yvone Magalhães Duarte grew up in the town of Boa Vista in the Brazilian Amazon state of Roraima. In 1978, at age 14 she moved to Rio de Janeiro to join her brothers living with her grandparents. She started training Brazilian jiu-jitsu (BJJ) with her older brother Pascoal Duarte, (Note: Today a BJJ coral belt) and his friend Sérgio Penha, before she joined them at the Osvaldvo Alves Jiu-Jitsu Academy. At first Duarte was the only woman training, their number then grew to fourteen, she started going to competitions to watch her brother compete. Duarte asked Marcelo Behring and Rickson Gracie if women could be included in the Carioca Championship, the local tournament, Grandmaster Hélio Gracie agreed on the condition that "no women of the Gracie family participate".

In 1985, a female division was added to the Rio de Janeiro BJJ federation allowing women to finally compete. Duarte won the first competition taking place in Rio, her division was for -60 kilograms (130 lb) women including white and blue belts. Duarte kept competing in very female BJJ division without losing a fight for the next ten years, winning both her weight class and the open class vision despite being only 52 kilograms (115 lb).

Towards the end of the 1980s Duarte settled in Brasilia and opened her own BJJ school Equpe Yvone Duarte, the first academy ran by a woman. In October 1990, Osvaldo Alves awarded Duarte her black belt, at age 27 Duarte became the first woman to earn a black belt in Brazilian jiu-jitsu, receiving her CBJJ (IBJJF) certificate in 1991. She helped establish the Federacao de Jiu-jitsu de Brasilia (Brasilia federation of jiu jitsu) helping to grow BJJ in the capital of the country. On 1 October 2013, she received her 5th degree black belt, granted by Carlos Gracie Jr and the IBJJF/CBJJ, from her brother. After moving to Rome with her family in 2018, she trained women in BJJ for the United Nations security course.

In August 2021, she made history again by becoming the first woman to receive a BJJ coral belt after receiving her 7th degree.

== Championships ==
Main achievements:

- Rio de Janeiro State Champion (1985, 1986, 1987 (Note: Weight and absolute))
- Brazilian National Champion (1991, 1992, 1996 (Note: Absolute))

== Instructor lineage ==
Carlos Gracie Sr. > Reyson Gracie > Osvaldo Alves > Yvone Duarte
