= 2014 Ju-Jitsu World Championships =

- Host city: Paris, France
- Dates: 28–30 November
- Main venue: Stade Pierre de Coubertin

The 2014 Ju-Jitsu World Championship were the 12th edition of the Ju-Jitsu World Championships, and were held in Paris, France from November 28 to November 30, 2014.

== Schedule ==
- 28.11.2014 – Men's and Women's Fighting System, Men's and Women's Jiu-Jitsu (ne-waza), Men's Duo System – Classic
- 29.11.2014 – Men's and Women's Fighting System, Men's and Women's Jiu-Jitsu (ne-waza), Women's Duo System – Classic
- 30.11.2014 – Men's Jiu-Jitsu (ne-waza), Mixed Duo System – Classic, Team event

== European Ju-Jitsu ==
=== Fighting System ===
==== Men's events ====
Category	Gold	Silver	Bronze	
–56 kg	Yevgeniy Maltsev (RUS)	Mehran Sattar (IRI)	Andrea Ventimiglia (ITA)	Bohdan Mochulskyy (UKR)
–62 kg	Roman Apolonov (GER)	Oliver Haider (AUT)	Julien Mathieu (FRA)	Vladimir Blokhin (RUS)
–69 kg	Pavel Korzhavykh (RUS)	Nicky Covyn (BEL)	Boy Vogelzang (NED)	Michael Garnier (FRA)
–77 kg	Ilya Borok (RUS)	Max Ryssel (GER)	Percy Kunsa (FRA)	Fredrik Widgren (SWE)
–85 kg	Mateusz Duran (POL)	Mikkel Willard (DEN)	Tomasz Krajewski (POL)	Ivan Nastenko (UKR)
–94 kg	Lazar Kuburović (MNE)	Goran Musić (MNE)	Benjamin Lah (SLO)	Roberto Crispolti (ITA)
+94 kg	Alexandre Fromangé (FRA)	Simon Roiger (GER)	Mojtaba Akbari (IRI)	Masud Jalilvand (IRI)

==== Women's events ====
Category	Gold	Silver	Bronze	
–49 kg	Agnieszka Bergier (POL)	Annabelle Reydy (FRA)	Andrea Plefka (GER)	Anastasia Tonelli (ITA)
–55 kg	Jessica Scricciolo (ITA)	Laure Beauchet (FRA)	Laura Campagne (FRA)	Martyna Bierońska (POL)
–62 kg	Carina Neupert (GER)	Lutsiya Tuktarova (RUS)	Séverine Nébié (FRA)	Mirjana Martinović (MNE)
–70 kg	Cynthia Schellingerhout (NED)	Aleksandra Ivanova (RUS)	Myriam Rahali (FRA)	Emilia Maćkowiak (POL)
+70 kg	Romy Korn (GER)	Alla Paderina (RUS)	Charella Westra (NED)	Jennie Brolin (SWE)

=== Duo System ===
==== Duo Classic events ====
Category	Gold	Silver	Bronze	
men	Dominique Beovardi (FRA); Jacques Beovardi (FRA)	Nikolaus Bichler (AUT); Sebastian Vosta (AUT)	Ronan Berhault (FRA); Yohann Berhault (FRA)	Vasilije Gagović (MNE); Stefan Vukotić (MNE)
women	Mirnesa Bećirović (AUT); Mirneta Bećirović (AUT)	Alexandra Erni (SUI); Antonia Erni (SUI)	Sandra Jungwirth (AUT); Bianca Zeller (AUT)	Jessica Castellani (ITA); Martina Pacioselli (ITA)
mix	Michele Vallieri (ITA); Sara Paganini (ITA)	Tom Ismer (GER); Dominika Zagorski (GER)	Michael Neumeier (GER); Anna Spruderer (GER)	Thomas Schönenberger (SUI); Sofia Jokl (SUI)

== Brazilian Jiu-Jitsu ==
=== Men's events ===
Category	Gold	Silver	Bronze	
–62 kg	Ron Cohen (ISR)	Mihai Handrea (ROU)	Marcel Leteri (ITA)	Oren Levin (ISR)
–69 kg	Maciej Polok (POL)	Dinu Bucalet (ROU)	Evyatar Paperni (ISR)	Stav Deri (ISR)
–77 kg	Wim Deputter (BEL)	Sébastien Lecocq (FRA)	David Ben Zaken (ISR)	Oualid Sbai (BEL)
–85 kg	Nellys Tonco (FRA)	Guillaume Piquet (FRA)	Paweł Bańczyk (POL)	Philip Andersson (SWE)
–94 kg	Florent Minguet (BEL)	Ivan Bykov (RUS)	Pierre David (FRA)	Alexander Gustafsson (SWE)
+94 kg	Camil Moldoveanu (ROU)	Sergey Boriskin (RUS)	Hakim Djabali (FRA)	Seif-Eddine Houmine (MAR)

=== Women's events ===
Category	Gold	Silver	Bronze	
–55 kg	Miriam Belousova (ISR)	Helena Edfeldt (SWE)	Océane Talvard (FRA)	Martyna Bierońska (POL)
–62 kg	Katrien Verheeke (BEL)	Amal Amjahid (BEL)	Charlotte Von Baumgarten (GER)	Anaïs Chauvel (FRA)
–70 kg	Janni Larsson (SWE)	Anna Polok (POL)	Anne Toupet (FRA)	Anke Müller (GER)
+70 kg	Éva Bisséni (FRA)	Claire-France Thévenon (FRA)	Justyna Sitko (POL)	

== Team event ==
Category	Gold	Silver	Bronze	
mixed teams	Russia	Germany	Denmark	France
