= Carlos "Caique" Elias =

Brazilian Jiu Jitsu artist

- Born: October 13, 1957 (age 68); Rio de Janeiro, Brazil
- Style: Brazilian Jiu-Jitsu
- Teachers: Hélio Gracie, Rickson Gracie
- Rank: 8th deg. BJJ coral belt

Other information
- Website: https://www.cjjusa.com/

Carlos Henrique "Caique" Elias (born October 13, 1957) is an 8th degree red-and-black belt master of Brazilian Jiu-Jitsu (BJJ).

== Biography ==
After starting his martial arts training in judo at age 15, he began training in 1975 with the Gracie family at the original Gracie Humaitá academy in Rio de Janeiro, Brazil. In 1982, Elias became one of only eight non-Gracies ever to receive his black belt directly from Hélio Gracie.

Elias taught at the Gracie Humaitá academy for many years while competing in tournaments. His most recent tournament victory was in the Brazilian nationals in 1995. In 1996, Elias moved with his family to the United States to teach at the new Gracie Academy in Torrance, California, which was expanding rapidly thanks to the popularity of the Ultimate Fighting Championship.

In 2001, Elias formed his own school, the Caique Jiu-Jitsu Academy. The school is now based in Lomita, California. He still actively teaches classes at his academy alongside his sons, black belt Pedro Elias and Thomaz Elias. When not teaching at the academy, Elias travels around the country holding seminars in the Caique Jiu-Jitsu network of schools and hosting BJJ tournaments.

Elias is featured in the book Grappling Masters. In March 2009, he was awarded a 7th degree red-and-black belt by Rickson Gracie followed by his 8th degree in February 2023.

== See also ==
- List of Brazilian Jiu-Jitsu practitioners
