= Claire-France Thévenon =

Brazilian jiu-jitsu practitioner from France

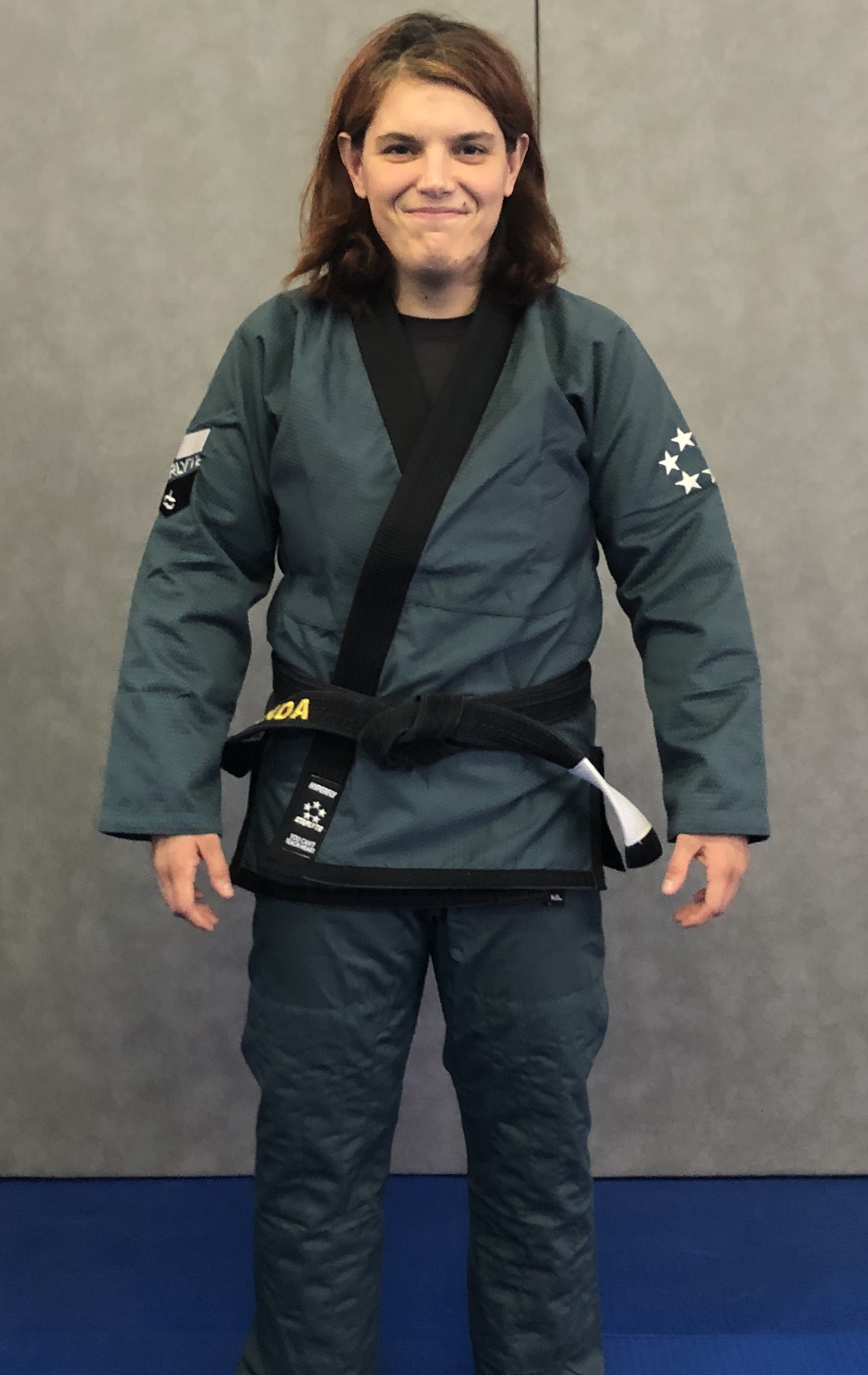
- Nickname: Panda
- Nationality: French
- Division: Gi Weight Classes; super-heavyweight +79.3 kg
- Style: Brazilian Jiu-Jitsu
- Team: Infinity / Panda Supa Crew; MK Team; Cercle Tissier (Note: Until brown belt); Kodokan Paris 15
- Teacher: Bruno Louis (Judo)
- Trainer: David Pierre-Louis; François Laurent; Olivier Michailesco
- Rank: 1st deg. BJJ black belt; 4th dan Judo black belt

Other information
- Occupation: BJJ instructor
- Website: pandasupacrew

Claire-France Thévenon is a French grappler, a 4th dan judo black belt and a 1st degree Brazilian jiu-jitsu (BJJ) black belt competitor and instructor. An IBJJF European Champion and World medallist at brown belt, Thévenon is a black belt World, Pan-American, European, AJP World Pro and AJP Grand Slam medallist as well as the 2022 Brazilian National Jiu-Jitsu Championship super-heavyweight silver medallist.

== Career ==
Thévenon started judo when she was nine years old, following in her siblings footsteps. She started training under 6th dan black belt Bruno Louis at his dojo Kodokan Paris 15. Competing in heavyweight, Thévenon reached the judo nationals in the first division. After attending a Brazilian jiu-jitsu (BJJ) seminar she started training under third-degree BJJ black belt Olivier "Mako" Michaïlesco. Thévenon started competing BJJ as a purple belt, reaching the finals of the European Open two years in a row in 2014 and 2015. Competing in Jujitsu/Ne-Waza she won silver at the 2014 World Championship in Paris as well as silver the following year in Bangkok. In 2017 she joined MK Team. As a brown belt she became the 2017 European Champion in the medium-heavyweight division after beating Jessica de Andrade in the final. Competing in Grappling she became UWW/FFL World Gi Champion after winning gold. The following year Thévenon won bronze at the IBJJF World Championship and at the 2018 European Open. She received her black belt from Michaïlesco in 2018, becoming the tenth female French jiu-jitsu black belt.

In 2019 Thévenon reached the final of the Abu Dhabi World Professional Championship winning silver, after facing Gabrieli Pessanha. She won again silver at the 2019 European No-Gi Championship in Italy, then silver at the European Championship in Portugal, competing at the 2019 Pan Championship she won bronze competing in the heavyweight division. Also in 2019 Thévenon became UWW World No-Gi Grappling Champion. In 2020 she won bronze at the European Open then gold at the Abu Dhabi Continental European Pro. In 2022 Thévenon joined MMA gym Infinity Combat, affiliating her own academy Panda Supa Crew to it. That same year, attending the Brazilian National Jiu-Jitsu Championship (known as Brasileiro) for the first time, Thévenon submitted 5x Brazilian national champion and European champion, Carina Santi of G13 BJJ with a rear naked choke, scoring 16 points to 0 and winning a silver medal in the super-heavyweight division. In June 2022 Thévenon won bronze at the 2022 World Jiu-Jitsu Championship taking place in California in the super heavyweight adult division. In June 2023 she won bronze at the 2023 World Jiu-Jitsu Championship.

== Championships and accomplishments ==
=== Brazilian jiu-jitsu ===
Main Achievements (Black Belt)

- Abu Dhabi Continental Pro European Champion (2020)
- IBJJF Dublin International Open Champion (2018)
- IBJJF Paris International Open Champion (2022 (Note: Weight and Absolute))
- IBJJF Rome Fall International Open Champion (2019)
- 2nd Place IBJJF European Open (2023 / 2022 / 2019)
- 2nd Place IBJJF European No-Gi Open (2019)
- 2nd Place Brazilian Nationals Championship (2022)
- 2nd place IBJJF Rome Fall International Open (2019 (Note: Absolute))
- 2nd place IBJJF Dublin International Open Champion (2018)
- 2nd Place AJP World Pro Championship (2019)
- 2nd Place AJP France National Pro (2021)
- 3rd Place IBJJF World Championship (2022 / 2023)
- 3rd Place IBJJF European Open (2020)
- 3rd place IBJJF London Fall International Open (2019)
- 3rd place IBJJF Rio International Open (2021)
- 3rd Place AJP Grand Slam World Tour LDN (2019)

Main Achievements (Coloured Belts)

- IBJJF European Open Champion (2017 brown)
- 2nd Place IBJJF European Open (2015 / 2014 purple)
- 3rd Place IBJJF World Championship (2018 brown)
- 3rd Place IBJJF European Open (2018 brown)

=== Grappling ===
- UWW/FFL World Gi Grappling Champion (2017)
- UWW European Gi Grappling Champion (2021)
- UWW/FFL World No-Gi Grappling Champion (2019)
- FFL French Open Gi Grappling Champion (2021)
- FFL French National Grappling Champion (2020)
- 2nd Place UWW/FFL European No-Gi Grappling Championship (2021)
- 2nd Place JJIF/FFJDA World Ne Waza Championship (2015 / 2016)

== Instructor lineage ==
Mitsuyo Maeda > Carlos Gracie > Helio Gracie > Flavio Behring > Olivier Michaïlesco > Claire-France Thévenon
