= 2005 in Pancrase =

Mixed martial arts events

Information
- First date: February 4, 2005
- Last date: December 4, 2005

Events
- Total events: 17

Fights
- Total fights: 158
- Title fights: 2

Chronology
2004 in Pancrase	2005 in Pancrase	2006 in Pancrase

The year 2005 was the 13th year in the history of Pancrase, a mixed martial arts promotion based in Japan. In 2005 Pancrase held 17 events beginning with Pancrase: Spiral 1.

== Title fights ==
Title fights in 2005
Weight class				Method	Round	Time	Event	Notes
Middleweight	Nate Marquardt (c)	def.	Izuru Takeuchi	Technical Submission (Rear-Naked Choke)	3	2:19	Pancrase: Spiral 4	(Note: For the Pancrase Middleweight Championship.)
Welterweight	Katsuya Inoue (ic)	def.	Kenji Arai	KO (Punch)	2	4:30	Pancrase: Spiral 4	(Note: For the Pancrase Welterweight Championship.)

== Events list ==
#	Event title	Date	Arena	Location
165	Pancrase: Spiral 10	December 4, 2005	Differ Ariake Arena	Tokyo, Japan
164	Pancrase: Spiral 9	November 4, 2005	Korakuen Hall	Tokyo, Japan
163	Pancrase: Hybrid Fight 2005	October 23, 2005	Hybrid Wrestling Kagoshima Gym	Izumi, Kagoshima, Japan
162	Pancrase: Spiral 8	October 2, 2005	Yokohama Cultural Gymnasium	Yokohama, Kanagawa, Japan
161	Pancrase: Spiral 7	September 4, 2005	Umeda Stella Hall	Osaka, Osaka, Japan
160	Pancrase: Z	September 3, 2005	Grand Messe Kumamoto	Kumamoto, Kumamoto, Japan
159	Pancrase: 2005 Neo-Blood Tournament Finals	August 27, 2005	Korakuen Hall	Tokyo, Japan
158	Pancrase: Hybrid Fight 2005	August 7, 2005	Hybrid Wrestling Kagoshima Gym	Izumi, Kagoshima, Japan
157	Pancrase: Spiral 6	July 31, 2005	Korakuen Hall	Tokyo, Japan
156	Pancrase: Spiral 5	July 10, 2005	Yokohama Cultural Gymnasium	Yokohama, Japan
155	Pancrase: 2005 Neo-Blood Tournament Semifinals	June 5, 2005	Gold's Gym South Tokyo Annex	Tokyo, Japan
154	Pancrase: Hybrid Fight 2005	May 22, 2005	Hybrid Wrestling Kagoshima Gym	Izumi, Kagoshima, Japan
153	Pancrase: Spiral 4	May 1, 2005	Yokohama Cultural Gymnasium	Yokohama, Kanagawa, Japan
152	Pancrase: Spiral 3	April 10, 2005	Umeda Stella Hall	Osaka, Osaka, Japan
151	Pancrase: Spiral 2	March 6, 2005	Yokohama Cultural Gymnasium	Yokohama, Kanagawa, Japan
150	Pancrase: 2005 Neo-Blood Tournament Eliminations	February 27, 2005	Gold's Gym South Tokyo Annex	Tokyo, Japan
149	Pancrase: Spiral 1	February 4, 2005	Korakuen Hall	Tokyo, Japan

== Pancrase: Spiral 1 ==
Pancrase: Spiral 1
- Date: February 4, 2005
- Venue: Korakuen Hall
- City: Tokyo, Japan

Pancrase: Spiral 1 was an event held on February 4, 2005, at Korakuen Hall in Tokyo, Japan.

=== Results ===
Main Card
Weight class				Method	Round	Time	Notes
	Katsuya Inoue	def.	Heath Sims	TKO (Punches)	1	4:40
	Yuji Sakuragi	def.	Kengo Watanabe	KO (Head Kick)	3	0:06
	Kestutis Arbocius	def.	Mitsuyoshi Sato	KO (Punches)	3	4:59
	Izuru Takeuchi	def.	Yuji Hisamatsu	Decision (Unanimous)	3	5:00
	Takafumi Ito	def.	Masakazu Kuramochi	KO (Punch)	1	3:30
	Hikaru Sato	def.	Sumio Koyano	TKO (Corner Stoppage)	1	2:57
	Takumi Yano	def.	Masaya Takita	Submission (Ankle Lock)	1	2:15
	Daizo Ishige	def.	Shinpei Sotoyama	KO (Punches)	1	0:35
	Moriyuki Yamada	def.	Tetsuo Seto	TKO (Doctor Stoppage)	1	4:41

== Pancrase: 2005 Neo-Blood Tournament Eliminations ==
Pancrase: 2005 Neo-Blood Tournament Eliminations
- Date: February 27, 2005
- Venue: Gold's Gym South Tokyo Annex
- City: Tokyo, Japan

Pancrase: 2005 Neo-Blood Tournament Eliminations was an event held on February 27, 2005, at Gold's Gym South Tokyo Annex in Tokyo, Japan.

=== Results ===
Main Card
Weight class				Method	Round	Time	Notes
	Naoki Yoshimura	def.	Kenji Takeshige	Submission (Triangle Choke)	2	4:29
	Sotaro Yamada	def.	Mitsuo Matsumoto	Submission (Rear-Naked Choke)	2	2:10
	Takafumi Shiroma	def.	Takumi Murata	Submission (Kimura)	2	4:11
	Naoji Fujimoto	def.	Daiki Hata	Decision (Unanimous)	2	5:00
	Toshiaki Kitada	def.	Akito Teraoka	Decision (Majority)	1	5:00
	Minoru Chujo	def.	Junichi Ota	Submission (Rear-Naked Choke)	1	4:58
	Masaki Yanagisawa	def.	Kenji Shimada	Decision (Majority)	1	5:00
	Toshiaki Kitada	def.	Hiroyuki Ota	Decision (Majority)	1	3:00
	Akito Teraoka	def.	Tetsuya Fukunaga	Submission (Armbar)	1	1:35
	Junichi Ota	def.	Hiroyuki Nohara	Decision (Majority)	1	3:00
	Minoru Chujo	def.	Taku Aramaki	Submission (Triangle Choke)	1	3:02
	Manabu Inoue	def.	Yuichi Miyagi	Decision (Unanimous)	2	3:00
	Takashi Hasegawa	def.	Hirokazu Nishimura	Decision (Unanimous)	1	5:00
	Masaki Yanagisawa	def.	Masaki Yokoyama	Decision (Unanimous)	1	5:00
	Kenji Shimada	def.	Ranki Kawana	Decision (Majority)	1	5:00

== Pancrase: Spiral 2 ==
Pancrase: Spiral 2
- Date: March 6, 2005
- Venue: Yokohama Cultural Gymnasium
- City: Yokohama, Kanagawa, Japan

Pancrase: Spiral 2 was an event held on March 6, 2005, at Yokohama Cultural Gymnasium in Yokohama, Kanagawa, Japan.

=== Results ===
Main Card
Weight class				Method	Round	Time	Notes
	Kazuo Misaki	def.	Flavio Luiz Moura	Submission (North-South Choke)	2	2:13
	Gustavo Machado	def.	Yuki Sasaki	Decision (Majority)	3	5:00
	Nilson de Castro	def.	Keiichiro Yamamiya	Decision (Unanimous)	3	5:00
	Satoru Kitaoka	def.	Hidehiko Hasegawa	Decision (Split)	3	5:00
	Ryuta Noji	def.	Hideki Tadao	KO (Knee to the Body)	1	4:25
	Takuya Wada	vs.	Hiroki Nagaoka	Draw	2	5:00
	Masahiro Yamagishi	def.	Ken Orihashi	TKO (Punches)	1	0:17
	Hisae Watanabe	def.	Naoko Omuro	Decision (Unanimous)	5	3:00
	Hidenobu Koike	vs.	Hirokazu Takamoto	Draw	2	5:00
	Asaki Honda	vs.	Yuki Takaya	Draw	2	5:00

== Pancrase: Spiral 3 ==
Pancrase: Spiral 3
- Date: April 10, 2005
- Venue: Umeda Stella Hall
- City: Osaka, Osaka, Japan

Pancrase: Spiral 3 was an event held on April 10, 2005, at Umeda Stella Hall in Osaka, Osaka, Japan.

=== Results ===
Main Card
Weight class				Method	Round	Time	Notes
	Yoshiro Maeda	def.	Takumi Murata	Submission (Armbar)	1	4:16
	Koji Oishi	def.	Daisuke Hanazawa	KO (Soccer Kick)	3	0:31
	Kenji Takeshige	def.	Yuji Miyazaki	KO (Soccer Kick)	1	1:53
	Naoji Fujimoto	def.	Kenji Shimada	Decision (Unanimous)	2	5:00
	Masato Nishiguchi	def.	Moriyuki Yamada	Submission (Rear-Naked Choke)	2	1:38
	Kenta Nakamura	def.	Tetsuo Uehata	Decision (Unanimous)	2	3:00
	Manabu Inoue	def.	Takashi Hasegawa	Decision (Split)	2	3:00
	Masahiro Toryu	def.	Norihiko Hamaguchi	KO (Punch)	1	0:10
	Yukiharu Maejima	def.	Yukinari Tamura	DQ (Knee to the Groin)	1	0:40
	Tatsunori Tanaka	def.	Satoru Takadaya	Technical Submission (Armbar)	1	1:01
	Tetsuya Fukunaga	vs.	Daiki Ozaki	Draw	2	5:00
	Masahiko Uechi	vs.	Nobuhiro Yamauchi	Draw	2	5:00
	Asuka Ito	def.	Yoko Oyama	Submission (Armbar)	2	2:40
	Kenta Nakamura	def.	Yutaka Nishikawa	Decision (Unanimous)	2	3:00
	Tetsuo Uehata	def.	Rikiya Kawakami	Submission (Heel Hook)	1	1:08

== Pancrase: Spiral 4 ==
Pancrase: Spiral 4
- Date: May 1, 2005
- Venue: Yokohama Cultural Gymnasium
- City: Yokohama, Kanagawa, Japan

Pancrase: Spiral 4 was an event held on May 1, 2005, at Yokohama Cultural Gymnasium in Yokohama, Kanagawa, Japan.

=== Results ===
Main Card
Weight class				Method	Round	Time	Notes
Middleweight	Nate Marquardt (c)	def.	Izuru Takeuchi	Technical Submission (Rear-Naked Choke)	3	2:19	(Note: For the Pancrase Middleweight Championship.)
Welterweight	Katsuya Inoue (ic)	def.	Kenji Arai	KO (Punch)	2	4:30	(Note: For the Pancrase Welterweight Championship.)
	Ryuta Noji	def.	Jin Chul Oh	TKO (Punches)	1	1:44
	Daisuke Watanabe	def.	Yuya Shirai	Decision (Majority)	2	5:00
	Hidehiko Hasegawa	def.	Naoki Seki	Submission (Achilles Lock)	1	1:59
	Takumi Yano	def.	Ippo Watanuki	Technical Submission (Kimura)	2	3:48
	Daizo Ishige	def.	Hiroki Nagaoka	Decision (Unanimous)	2	5:00
	Takehiro Iseya	vs.	Shinsuke Shoji	Draw	2	5:00

== Pancrase: Hybrid Fight 2005 ==
Pancrase: Hybrid Fight 2005
- Date: May 22, 2005
- Venue: Hybrid Wrestling Kagoshima Gym
- City: Izumi, Kagoshima, Japan

Pancrase: Hybrid Fight 2005 was an event held on May 22, 2005, at Hybrid Wrestling Kagoshima Gym in Izumi, Kagoshima, Japan.

=== Results ===
Main Card
Weight class				Method	Round	Time	Notes
	Katsunori Kikuno	vs.	Hirotaka Uehara	Draw	2	5:00
	Takuya Oniki	def.	Taishi Ikeda	Submission (Rear-Naked Choke)	2	2:08
	Toshiki Tanayama	def.	Nobuyuki Arimura	Decision (Majority)	2	5:00
	Shinichiro Hattori	def.	Taketo Tomita	Technical Submission (Guillotine Choke)	1	1:20
	Kazuyuki Arimura	def.	Kensuke Higa	Technical Submission (Smother Choke)	2	3:00
	Kosei Fukushima	def.	Tatsuji Sakamoto	TKO (Head Kick)	1	0:22

== Pancrase: 2005 Neo-Blood Tournament Semifinals ==
Pancrase: 2005 Neo-Blood Tournament Semifinals
- Date: June 5, 2005
- Venue: Gold's Gym South Tokyo Annex
- City: Tokyo, Japan

Pancrase: 2005 Neo-Blood Tournament Semifinals was an event held on June 5, 2005, at Gold's Gym South Tokyo Annex in Tokyo, Japan.

=== Results ===
Main Card
Weight class				Method	Round	Time	Notes
	Asaki Honda	def.	Hirokazu Takamoto	TKO (Punches)	2	2:36
	Shinsuke Shoji	def.	Yohei Ota	KO (Punch)	1	0:09
	Minoru Chujo	def.	Toshiaki Kitada	Decision (Split)	2	5:00
	Sotaro Yamada	def.	Naoki Yoshimura	Decision (Unanimous)	2	5:00
	Masaki Yanagisawa	def.	Takafumi Shiroma	Submission (Triangle Choke)	2	0:35
	Manabu Inoue	def.	Naoji Fujimoto	Decision (Split)	2	5:00
	Takumi Murata	def.	Minoru Tsuiki	Decision (Split)	2	5:00
	Daiki Hata	vs.	Katsuhiro Hirata	Draw	2	5:00
	Tomomi Sunaba	def.	Yoko Hattori	TKO (Corner Stoppage)	2	1:08
	Asuka Ito	def.	Seri Saito	Decision (Majority)	3	3:00
	Shin Katayama	vs.	Ichiro Kudo	Draw	2	5:00

== Pancrase: Spiral 5 ==
Pancrase: Spiral 5
- Date: July 10, 2005
- Venue: Yokohama Cultural Gymnasium
- City: Yokohama, Japan

Pancrase: Spiral 5 was an event held on July 10, 2005, at Yokohama Cultural Gymnasium in Yokohama, Japan.

=== Results ===
Main Card
Weight class				Method	Round	Time	Notes
	Kazuo Takahashi	def.	Yuji Sakuragi	Submission (Armbar)	2	3:01
	Satoru Kitaoka	def.	Thomas Schulte	Submission (Heel Hook)	1	1:11
	Daijiro Matsui	vs.	Elvis Sinosic	Draw	2	5:00
	Hikaru Sato	def.	Seiji Ogura	Submission (Rear-Naked Choke)	1	4:16
	Masayuki Kono	def.	Yukio Kawabe	Technical Submission (Kimura)	1	1:10
	Daiki Hata	def.	Kentaro Imaizumi	Decision (Unanimous)	2	5:00
	Alex Roberts	def.	Masahiro Yamagishi	KO (Punch)	1	0:27
	Atsushi Yamamoto	def.	Nobuyuki Kato	Submission (Guillotine Choke)	1	3:14
	Tomomi Sunaba	def.	Misaki Takimoto	Decision (Unanimous)	3	3:00
	Kazunori Yokota	def.	Daigo Ishijima	Technical Submission (Armbar)	1	4:41

== Pancrase: Spiral 6 ==
Pancrase: Spiral 6
- Date: July 31, 2005
- Venue: Korakuen Hall
- City: Tokyo, Japan

Pancrase: Spiral 6 was an event held on July 31, 2005, at Korakuen Hall in Tokyo, Japan.

=== Results ===
Main Card
Weight class				Method	Round	Time	Notes
	Yoshiro Maeda	def.	Colin Mannsur	TKO (Punches)	1	2:43
	Ivan Menjivar	def.	Miki Shida	Decision (Unanimous)	3	5:00
	Takumi Yano	def.	Kuntap Weerasakreck	Technical Submission (Kimura)	1	4:38
	Yuji Sakuragi	def.	Aslan Dzeboev	KO (Kick to the Body)	2	1:31
	Takumi Murata	def.	Daiki Hata	Decision (Unanimous)	2	5:00
	Masaya Takita	def.	Ippo Watanuki	Decision (Unanimous)	2	5:00

== Pancrase: Hybrid Fight 2005 ==
Pancrase: Hybrid Fight 2005
- Date: August 7, 2005
- Venue: Hybrid Wrestling Kagoshima Gym
- City: Izumi, Kagoshima, Japan

Pancrase: Hybrid Fight 2005 was an event held on August 7, 2005, at Hybrid Wrestling Kagoshima Gym in Izumi, Kagoshima, Japan.

=== Results ===
Main Card
Weight class				Method	Round	Time	Notes
	Kosei Fukushima	def.	Sei Ikeda	KO (Head Kick)	1	4:22
	Akihiro Tateyama	def.	Shinichiro Hattori	Submission (Guillotine Choke)	1	3:15
	Katsuhiko Matsutomi	def.	Hirofumi Sakashita	Technical Submission (Armbar)	2	2:18
	Takuya Oniki	def.	Kazuyuki Arimura	Submission (Rear-Naked Choke)	1	4:02
	Go Matsuo	def.	Takahiro Sano	Technical Submission (Armbar)	2	3:41
	Ryo Taguchi	def.	Taketo Tomita	Submission (Triangle Choke)	2	3:36

== Pancrase: 2005 Neo-Blood Tournament Finals ==
Pancrase: 2005 Neo-Blood Tournament Finals
- Date: August 27, 2005
- Venue: Korakuen Hall
- City: Tokyo, Japan

Pancrase: 2005 Neo-Blood Tournament Finals was an event held on August 27, 2005, at Korakuen Hall in Tokyo, Japan.

=== Results ===
Main Card
Weight class				Method	Round	Time	Notes
	Koji Oishi	def.	Nate Diaz	Decision (Unanimous)	3	5:00
	Daijiro Matsui	def.	Daisuke Watanabe	TKO (Doctor Stoppage)	2	5:00
	Shinsuke Shoji	def.	Asaki Honda	Decision (Unanimous)	2	5:00
	Sotaro Yamada	def.	Minoru Chujo	Decision (Unanimous)	2	5:00
	Manabu Inoue	def.	Masaki Yanagisawa	Decision (Unanimous)	2	5:00
	Yuichi Nakanishi	vs.	Yuji Hisamatsu	Draw	2	5:00
	Takuya Wada	def.	Masakazu Kuramochi	Decision (Unanimous)	2	5:00
	Kozo Urita	def.	Moriyuki Yamada	Submission (Guillotine Choke)	2	3:37
	Naoki Miyamoto	vs.	Naoki Tajima	Draw	2	5:00

== Pancrase: Z ==
Pancrase: Z
- Date: September 3, 2005
- Venue: Grand Messe Kumamoto
- City: Kumamoto, Kumamoto, Japan

Pancrase: Z was an event held on September 3, 2005, at Grand Messe Kumamoto in Kumamoto, Kumamoto, Japan.

=== Results ===
Main Card
Weight class				Method	Round	Time	Notes
	Hikaru Sato	def.	Tenshin Matsumoto	Technical Submission (Rear-Naked Choke)	1	2:43
	Yuji Sakuragi	def.	Yuta Nakamura	Decision (Unanimous)	2	5:00
	Mitsuhisa Sunabe	def.	Minoru Tsuiki	Submission (Triangle Choke)	1	4:21
	Sayaka Shioda	def.	Emi Kuroda	Submission (Heel Hook)	1	0:41
	Hidenobu Koike	def.	Motohiro Takenawa	Submission (Triangle Choke)	1	0:55
	Yuichi Miyagi	def.	Taishi Ikeda	TKO (Punches)	1	1:47
	Tatsuya Kawano	def.	Takayuki Nakasato	Submission (Armbar)	1	1:50

== Pancrase: Spiral 7 ==
Pancrase: Spiral 7
- Date: September 4, 2005
- Venue: Umeda Stella Hall
- City: Osaka, Osaka, Japan

Pancrase: Spiral 7 was an event held on September 4, 2005, at Umeda Stella Hall in Osaka, Osaka, Japan.

=== Results ===
Main Card
Weight class				Method	Round	Time	Notes
	Yoshiro Maeda	def.	Miki Shida	KO (Punches)	3	2:17
	Anthony Netzler	def.	Alex Roberts	Submission (Heel Hook)	1	1:53
	Yuichi Ikari	vs.	Kenji Takeshige	Draw	2	5:00
	Naoji Fujimoto	def.	Kenta Nakamura	Technical Submission (Armbar)	1	3:10
	Tatsunori Tanaka	def.	Daizo Ishige	Technical Submission (Armbar)	1	2:07
	Yuji Miyazaki	def.	Toshiaki Kitada	Decision (Unanimous)	2	5:00
	Asuka Ito	def.	Eri Takahashi	Decision (Unanimous)	3	3:00
	Hidemi Mihara	def.	Motoki Ejima	Decision (Unanimous)	1	5:00
	Takashi Hasegawa	vs.	Nobuhiro Yamauchi	Draw	2	5:00
	Tomoyuki Kodama	def.	Shunsuke Kimura	Submission (Neck Crank)	2	4:12
	Hidemi Mihara	def.	Masahiro Toryu	Decision (Unanimous)	2	3:00
	Motoki Ejima	def.	Arito Kishimoto	TKO (Punches)	1	3:42

== Pancrase: Spiral 8 ==
Pancrase: Spiral 8
- Date: October 2, 2005
- Venue: Yokohama Cultural Gymnasium
- City: Yokohama, Kanagawa, Japan

Pancrase: Spiral 8 was an event held on October 2, 2005, at Yokohama Cultural Gymnasium in Yokohama, Kanagawa, Japan.

=== Results ===
Main Card
Weight class				Method	Round	Time	Notes
	Yuki Kondo	def.	Hiromitsu Kanehara	Decision (Unanimous)	3	5:00
	Mike Kyle	def.	Tsuyoshi Kosaka	Technical Decision (Unanimous)	3	1:17
	Satoru Kitaoka	def.	Carlos Condit	Submission (Heel Hook)	1	3:57
	Hideki Tadao	def.	Yuji Sakuragi	Submission (Arm-Triangle Choke)	2	3:33
	Poai Suganuma	def.	Hikaru Sato	Decision (Unanimous)	2	5:00
	Aslan Dzeboev	def.	Masayuki Kono	KO (Punch)	1	4:12
	Kazuo Takahashi	def.	Kestutis Arbocius	Decision (Majority)	3	5:00
	Yuki Takaya	def.	Hitoki Tsuti	Submission (Triangle Choke)	1	4:43
	Taku Aramaki	vs.	Kenichi Ito	Draw	2	5:00
	Yuichiro Shirai	def.	Yo Saito	TKO (Head Kick)	2	3:33

== Pancrase: Hybrid Fight 2005 ==
Pancrase: Hybrid Fight 2005
- Date: October 23, 2005
- Venue: Hybrid Wrestling Kagoshima Gym
- City: Izumi, Kagoshima, Japan

Pancrase: Hybrid Fight 2005 was an event held on October 23, 2005, at Hybrid Wrestling Kagoshima Gym in Izumi, Kagoshima, Japan.

=== Results ===
Main Card
Weight class				Method	Round	Time	Notes
	Yusuke Kitagawa	def.	Go Matsuo	Submission (Armbar)	1	4:59
	Kenji Horikiri	vs.	Shinichiro Hattori	Draw	2	5:00
	Kazuyuki Arimura	def.	Posed Man	Technical Submission (Rear-Naked Choke)	2	2:45
	Akihiro Tateyama	def.	Takuro Takuro	Technical Submission (Armbar)	1	4:41
	Eiji Saito	def.	Sei Ikeda	Submission (Keylock)	1	1:20
	Nobyuki Ono	def.	Masahiro Matsuoka	Decision (Majority)	2	5:00
	Nobumasa Koga	def.	Kotaro Kotaro	Technical Submission (Rear-Naked Choke)	1	1:53

== Pancrase: Spiral 9 ==
Pancrase: Spiral 9
- Date: November 4, 2005
- Venue: Korakuen Hall
- City: Tokyo, Japan

Pancrase: Spiral 9 was an event held on November 4, 2005, at Korakuen Hall in Tokyo, Japan.

=== Results ===
Main Card
Weight class				Method	Round	Time	Notes
	Poai Suganuma	def.	Ryuta Noji	Submission (Triangle Choke)	1	3:12
	Paul Rodriguez	vs.	Koji Oishi	Draw	3	5:00
	Kenji Arai	def.	Furdjel de Windt	Decision (Unanimous)	3	5:00
	Izuru Takeuchi	def.	Kozo Urita	Decision (Unanimous)	2	5:00
	Riki Fukuda	def.	Yuta Nakamura	TKO (Punches)	1	0:57
	Kentaro Imaizumi	vs.	Takumi Murata	Draw	2	5:00
	Daizo Ishige	def.	Shinsuke Shoji	Decision (Majority)	2	5:00
	Sotaro Yamada	def.	Kazuhiro Inoue	Technical Submission (Rear Naked Choke)	1	2:51
	Manabu Inoue	def.	Nobuyuki Kato	TKO (Punches)	2	2:59
	Aslan Dzeboev	def.	Jimmy Akishige	KO (Punch)	1	0:20

== Pancrase: Spiral 10 ==
Pancrase: Spiral 10
- Date: December 4, 2005
- Venue: Differ Ariake Arena
- City: Tokyo, Japan

Pancrase: Spiral 10 was an event held on December 4, 2005, at Differ Ariake Arena in Tokyo, Japan.

=== Results ===
Main Card
Weight class				Method	Round	Time	Notes
	Takafumi Ito	def.	Andy Wang	Decision (Split)	3	5:00
	Hikaru Sato	vs.	Kyosuke Sasaki	Draw	1	10:00
	Ichiro Kanai	def.	Shunichi Akimoto	TKO (Doctor Stoppage)	2	4:32
	Tomomi Sunaba	def.	Sayaka Shioda	TKO (Punches)	1	2:14
	Ryo Kawamura	def.	Sumio Koyano	Decision (Unanimous)	2	5:00
	Yuichiro Shirai	def.	Minoru Tsuiki	Submission (Armbar)	1	0:15
	Kenji Shimada	def.	Masaki Yanagisawa	KO (Punch)	2	2:42

== See also ==
- Pancrase
- List of Pancrase champions
- List of Pancrase events
