= Sayaka Shioda =

Martial artist from Japan

Sayaka Shioda 塩田 さやか
- Born: Itakura, Japan
- Native name: 塩田 さやか
- Height: 5 ft 1 in (155 cm)
- Weight: 119 lb (54 kg; 8 st 7 lb)
- Division: Lightweight (BJJ/Sambo); Flyweight (MMA)
- Team: Abe Ani Combat Club AACC
- Trainer: Hiroyuki Abe Sensei
- Rank: BJJ black belt; 2nd dan Judo black belt; Sambo master of sport; B-class Shootist
- Years active: 2005–2013 (MMA)

Mixed martial arts record
- Total: 5
- Wins: 4
- By submission: 3
- By decision: 1
- Losses: 1
- By knockout: 1

Other information
- Mixed martial arts record from Sherdog

Sayaka Shioda (塩田 さやか, Sayaka Shioda) is a Japanese former mixed martial arts (MMA) fighter, Sambo, submission grappling and Brazilian jiu-jitsu black belt practitioner.

In MMA, Shioda is a Shooto Grappling Flyweight Champion. A two-time Pan IBJJF Champion in the lower belt jiu-jitsu divisions, Shioda is an ADCC Submission Fighting World Champion, a Sambo World Champion and a three-time IBJJF World Jiu-Jitsu Championship medallist.

== Career ==
Sayaka Shioda was born in Itakurai Ora, Gunma, Japan, she is a black belt in Brazilian jiu-jitsu (BJJ), Judo and Sambo. She started MMA in 2005 fighting as a Flyweight with three pro fights that year in Pancrase and Shooto, that same year she won silver at the 2005 Pan Jiu-Jitsu IBJJF Championship competing as a lightweight, in a combined purple/brown/black category. In 2007 she won the ADCC Asian Championships in Tokyo, Japan in the 55 kg category thus qualifying for the World Championship.

Shioda won the 2007 ADCC World Championship after defeating Cynthia Hales in the quarter-final, Bianca Baretto in the semi and Felicia Oh in the final. That same year she won silver at the 2007 IBJJF World Jiu-Jitsu Championship losing to Laurence Cousin in the final. The following year she won bronze in the 2008 IBJJF World openweight after losing to Kyra Gracie; she won silver in her weight class at the 2009 IBJJF World after being submitted by Bianca Andrade in the final with just a few second left.

At the 2009 ADCC World Championship Shioda came second in the -60 kg division, after defeating Bianca Andrade and Hillary Williams but losing to Luanna Alzuguir in the final. In 2010 Shioda faced Rikako Yuasa during DEEP X 05, submitting her in 22 seconds.

In 2012, Shioda qualified for the Abu Dhabi World Brazilian jiu-jitsu Pro during the trials organised in Tokyo, competing in the light division. Fighting under team Abe Ani Combat Club (AACC) at the 2012 World IBJJF Jiu-Jitsu No-Gi Championship she won bronze after losing to Ana Carolina Vidal of Gracie Humaita in the semi-final.

In March 2013, she participated to the 2nd ADCC Asia trials taking place in Tokyo, finishing second in the -60 kg category after Seiko Yamamoto. In October 2013 she returned to MMA for the third edition of Real Fight Championship in the under 56 kg category, defeating the Chinese Jin Tang in the first round.

== Championships and accomplishments ==
=== Submission Grappling ===
Main Achievements:

- ADCC Submission Fighting World Champion (2007)
- ADCC Asian Champion (2007)
- 2nd place ADCC Asian Championship (2013)
- 2nd place ADCC Submission Fighting World Championship (2009)

=== Brazilian jiu-jitsu ===
Main Achievements (black belt):

- 2nd place IBJJF World Championship (2009 (Note: brown/black feather division) 2007 (Note: brown/black light division))
- 2nd place IBJJF World No-Gi Championship (2012)
- 3rd place IBJJF World Championship (2008 (Note: brown/black openweight division))

Main Achievements (coloured belts):

- IBJJF Pan American Champion (2006 purple (Note: feather division) / 2004 blue (Note: Feather division))
- JBJJF All Japan Brazilian Jiu-Jitsu Champion (2005 (Note: purple/brown/black Absolute division))
- 2nd place IBJJF Pan Championship (2005 (Note: purple/brown/black lightweight division))
- 2nd place IBJJF Asian Championship (2006 purple (Note: purple division))
- 3rd place JBJJF All Japan Brazilian Jiu-Jitsu Championship (2005)

=== Sambo ===
Main Achievements:

- 3rd place World Sambo Championship (2008)
- All Japan Sambo Women's 66 kg Champion (2005)

=== MMA ===
- All Japan Shooto Grappling Championship – Women's Flyweight Champion (2004)
- All Japan Amateur Shooto – Women's Bantamweight Champion (2004)

== Mixed martial arts record ==
Professional record breakdown
5 matches	4 wins	1 loss
By knockout	0	1
By submission	3	0
By decision	1	0

Res.	Record	Opponent	Method	Event	Date	Round	Time	Location	Notes
Win	4–1	Jin Tang	Submission (kneebar)	Real Fight MMA Championship 3	October 20, 2013	1	0:57	Beijing, China	
Win	3–1	Asuka Ito	Decision (unanimous)	Pancrase – Blow 5	June 6, 2006	3	3:00	Tokyo, Japan	
Loss	2–1	Tomomi Sunaba	TKO (head kick and punches)	Pancrase – Spiral 10	December 4, 2005	1	2:14	Tokyo, Japan	
Win	2–0	Emi Kuroda	Submission (heel hook)	Pancrase – Z	September 3, 2005	1	0:44	Kumamoto, Japan	
Win	1–0	Seri Saito	Submission (reverse triangle choke)	G-Shooto – G-Shooto 02	March 12, 2005	1	3:59	Tokyo, Japan	
