= Sérgio Penha =

American martial artist

- Born: August 20, 1959 (age 66); Rio de Janeiro, Brazil
- Style: Brazilian jiu-jitsu
- Rank: 8th deg. BJJ coral belt

Other information
- Website: https://sergiopenha.com/

Sérgio Luiz da Penha (born August 20, 1959) is a Brazilian jiu-jitsu practitioner and instructor. He is most known for an epic fight against Rickson Gracie in the 1980s. Sergio has coached well-known MMA fighters in Las Vegas such as Steve Cantwell, Anthony and Chidi Njokuani and the late Stephan Bonnar. He has received one of the highest honors in Brazilian Jiu-Jitsu by obtaining his eighth degree red and white belt.

Penha is notable for being one of a very small number of Brazilian Jiu-Jitsu practitioners skilled enough to completely bypass the rank of brown belt, moving straight from purple to black belt.

Some sources claim that Penha may have been responsible for training Kazushi Sakuraba in Brazilian jiu-jitsu during his course of victories over various members of the renowned Gracie family. In an interview, Penha confirmed he had taught Sakuraba at the Takada Dojo, although he clarified it had been only 15 days in December 2001, long after Sakuraba had achieved his wins over the Gracie family. He also revealed the Takada Dojo fighters had been interested to learn "not secret methods and strategies specifically for beating jiu-jitsu," but "just basic techniques."

== Instructor lineage ==
Kano Jigoro → Tomita Tsunejiro → Mitsuyo "Count Koma" Maeda → Carlos Gracie → Reyson Gracie → Osvaldo Alves → Sergio Penha

== See also ==
- List of Brazilian Jiu-Jitsu practitioners
