= 2007 World Jiu-Jitsu Championship =

Brazilian Jiu-Jitsu competitions

The 2007 World Jiu-Jitsu Championship was held August 23–26, 2007 at California State University in Long Beach, California, United States. It was the first Mundial tournament to be held outside Brazil.

== Results ==
=== Academy Results ===
	Juvenile	Female	Adult
1º	Alliance	Gracie Humaitá	Gracie Barra
2º	Ryan Gracie	Brasa	Alliance
3º	Nova União	Gracie Barra	Brasa
