= 2003 World Jiu-Jitsu Championship =

Brazilian Jiu-Jitsu competitions

The 2003 World Jiu-Jitsu Championship was held at Tijuca Tênis Clube, Rio de Janeiro, Brazil.

== Results ==
	Juvenile	Female	Adult
1º	Gracie Barra	Carlson Gracie UGF	Gracie Barra
2º	Carlson Gracie UGF	Behring	Master
3º	Gracie Barra Pitbull	Gracie Barra	Brazilian Top Team
