= Flavio Behring =

Brazilian jiu-jitsu practitioner (born 1937)

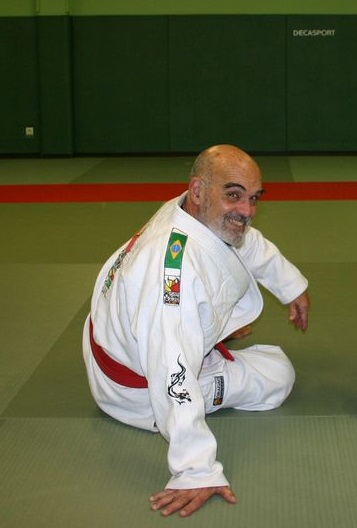
- Born: 21 November 1937 (age 88)
- Nationality: Brazilian
- Team: Behring Jiu-Jitsu
- Trainer: Helio Gracie; Joao Alberto Barreto
- Rank: 9th deg. BJJ red belt

Other information
- Occupation: BJJ instructor
- Children: 2

Flavio Behring (born 21 November 1937) is a Grand Master, 9th-degree red belt in Brazilian jiu-jitsu. A student under Hélio Gracie he began his career in 1947 and is one of the longest practitioner and coach of Brazilian jiu-jitsu.

== Career ==
Flavio Behring was born on 21 November 1937, he started learning Brazilian jiu-jitsu (BJJ) at the age of 10 at Helio Gracie’s academy in Rio de Janeiro, at 14 he was moved to the Gracie Academy in Rio Branco where he became an instructor in 1955, while continuing to study under both Helio Gracie and João Alberto Barreto. In the early 60's Behring started to also training Judo and competing in championships. In 1970, together with Ricardo Murgel, Behring opened his first gym in Barra da Tijuca, Rio de Janeiro.

In 1987 with the help of his son Marcelo, a black belt under Rickson Gracie (Note: his other son Sylvio was graded by Alvaro Barreto and is today a BJJ 8th degree Coral Belt, a Judo black belt and one of the top grappling instructors in the world) and "one of BJJ’s shining stars", Behring opened his own school. On 5 September 2006 Behring received his red belt from his former coach Joao Alberto Barreto, earning with it the title of Grand Master, the 9th-degree red belt is the highest rank achievable to any living practitioner of Brazilian jiu-jitsu. (Note: In 2017 to celebrate turning 80 and his 70 years of Jiu-Jitsu he replaced his red belt with a white belt with a red bar.)

== Instructor lineage ==
Mitsuyo Maeda > Carlos Gracie > Helio Gracie > Flavio Behring
