= Rickson Gracie =

Brazilian jiu-jitsu practitioner and former mixed martial artist (born 1959)

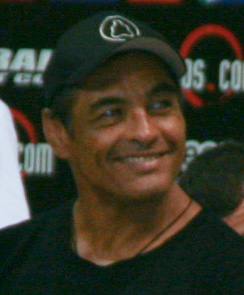
- Born: November 21, 1959 (age 67); Rio de Janeiro, Brazil
- Height: 5 ft 10 in (1.78 m)
- Weight: 185 lb (84 kg; 13 st 3 lb)
- Division: Middleweight
- Teachers: Helio Gracie, Rolls Gracie
- Rank: 9th degree red belt in Brazilian jiu-jitsu under Rorion Gracie; 1st degree black belt in Judo under Georges Mehdi
- Years active: 1980, 1984, 1994-2000 (MMA)

Mixed martial arts record
- Total: 11
- Wins: 11
- By knockout: 2
- By submission: 9
- Losses: 0

Other information
- Notable relatives: Kron Gracie, son
- Mixed martial arts record from Sherdog

Rickson Gracie (Brazilian Portuguese: [ˈʁiksõ ˈɡɾejsi]; born November 21, 1959) is a Brazilian retired mixed martial artist. He is a member of the Gracie family: the third oldest son of Hélio Gracie, brother to Rorion and Relson Gracie, and half-brother to Rolker, Royce, Robin and Royler Gracie. In the 1980s and 1990s, he was widely considered to be the best fighter of the Gracie clan, and one of the toughest in the world. In July 2017, he was promoted to ninth-degree red belt, the second-highest ranking in Brazilian jiu-jitsu.

Rickson Gracie is considered an important pioneer for both Brazilian Jiu-Jitsu and mixed martial arts (MMA). He had several vale tudo bouts in Brazil in the 1980s, and in the 1990s Gracie became a high-profile competitor in Japan, having won Vale Tudo Japan 1994 and 1995 tournaments, he also headlined Pride 1 and Pride 4 against popular professional wrestler Nobuhiko Takada, all which are credited to have helped to popularize the sport in Japan. He retired with an undefeated record of 11 wins and no losses, all by submission. In 2017, Gracie was named Man of the Year by Black Belt magazine.

== Biography ==
Rickson Gracie, son of Helio Gracie, received his black belt in Brazilian jiu-jitsu at age 18 in 1977.

=== Matches against Rei Zulu ===
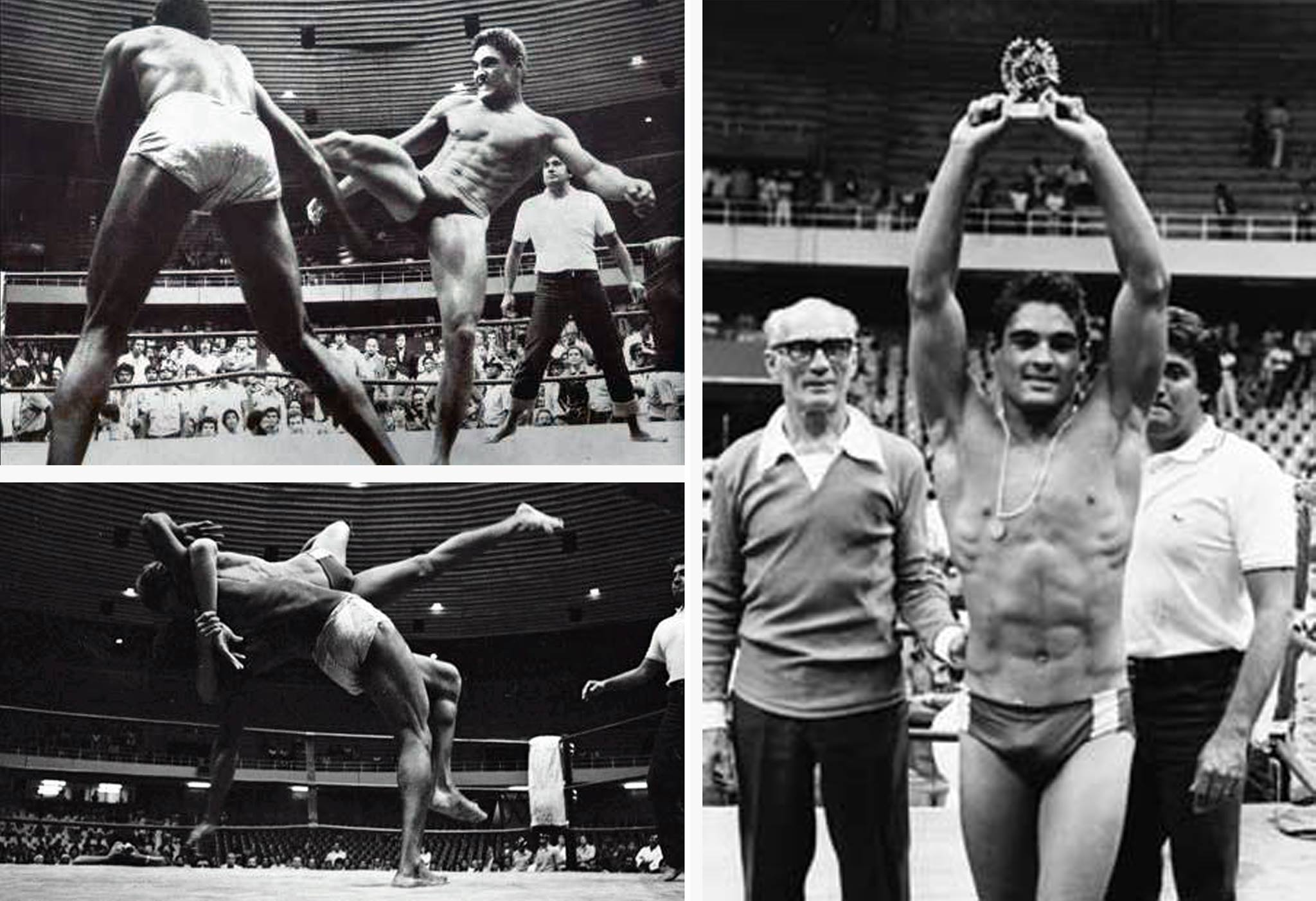
Rickson Gracie in his matches against Rei Zulu

At 20, Gracie was pitted in a high-profile fight in Brasília against famous Brazilian professional wrestler and fighter Casemiro "Rei Zulu" Nascimento Martins (father of Zuluzinho). Rei Zulu was not a qualified martial artist, having only a background in a supposedly indigenous wrestling style named tarracá, but he weighed 230 pounds (104 kg) and had experience in the vale tudo circuit, being supposedly 270–0 at the time. Despite the size difference, Gracie won the match at the third round by submitting Zulu with a rear naked choke, gaining immediate national recognition.

In 1984, Zulu requested a rematch in Rio de Janeiro, which became a controversial affair. According to Zulu, the Gracie family demanded the rules to be changed just one hour before the event, banning closed-fisted strikes, direct punches to the face, and kicks to a downed opponent. During the match, held in the Maracanazinho before an audience of 20,000 spectators, Zulu himself fouled by trying to eye-gouge Gracie, while Gracie himself gave Zulu a low blow later into the fight. Gracie also claimed Zulu was oiled up with vaseline in order to impede his grip. In any case, Gracie won again, submitting his opponent with another choke in the second round.

In November of the same year, Zulu defeated kickboxing champion Sérgio "Rock" Batarelli in another fight, which was the condition to host another match against Gracie, but it never happened.

=== Challenges to luta livre ===
In 1988, promoters tried to put together an anticipated fight between Gracie and luta livre exponent Marco Ruas. However, Hélio Gracie refused, demanding either that Gracie received a higher payment or that the bout happened inside the Gracie Academy, which were both rejected, so the fight didn't take place. Later, Gracie himself challenged Ruas to an impromptu match during a meeting with luta livre fighters in the Clube Boqueirão do Passeio. The reasons why this second fight fell off too are disputed: Gracie claimed Ruas asked for time to train, while Ruas claimed Hélio shut down the idea by claiming Ruas was not a true luta livre representative. Other names like Eugenio Tadeu and Hugo Duarte were offered, but rejected.

Months later, Gracie was challenged by lutador Denilson Maia, but the latter's father died and he had to be replaced by Duarte. Although Duarte only wanted to fight in an event for a purse, Gracie encountered him on the beach, slapped him in front of his students and demanded him to fight there, so Hugo stepped down and faced Gracie on the sand. Gracie won after making him surrender to punches to the face. Shortly after, claiming that Gracie students had kicked him and thrown sand to his eyes during the fight, Duarte came to Gracie's gym and demanded a rematch. Gracie won again, causing a riot which forced neighbours to call the police.

Shortly after, Gracie challenged Tadeu, who had been entangled in a bout with his brother Royler when the police came. Royler and Tadeu fought to a 50-minute draw. The rivalry between Brazilian jiu-jitsu and luta livre continued without Rickson Gracie, as he left Brazil for the United States after the fight.

=== Vale Tudo Japan ===
In 1994, Gracie was contacted by Erik Paulson to compete in Satoru Sayama's event Vale Tudo Japan. Gracie traveled to Japan and participated in the tournament, firstly facing Daido-juku stylist Yoshinori Nishi. Gracie took him down and Nishi answered with a lockdown from half guard, but Gracie was able to pass his guard and catch him with a rear naked choke when Nishi turned his back. He later faced much larger wing chun practitioner Dave Levicki, but he was an even easier prey once taken down, and Gracie won by TKO after a flurry of punches. Gracie then fought American kickboxer Bud Smith at the finals, winning by the same method in even less time and getting the tournament's victory.

The same year, Union of Wrestling Force International (UWFi), which was seeking legitimate fighters from other martial arts for inter-style matches so they could demonstrate the superiority of its "Real Pro-Wrestling" style, entered negotiations for Gracie to face UWFi star Nobuhiko Takada. The negotiations ultimately failed, reportedly because Gracie was unwilling to participate in a predetermined professional wrestling match, as doing so would have lent credibility to UWFi's claims of realism while potentially undermining his own reputation as a legitimate fighter. Takada subsequently provoked and publicly challenged Gracie, further escalating the dispute.

In December, pro wrestler Yoji Anjo travelled to Los Angeles and performed a dojo storm, challenging him to a fight. Gracie was the better in the fight and performed abundant ground and pound on Anjo, who did not surrender, so Gracie choked him unconscious. Anjo had traveled accompanied by UWFi executive Shinji Sasazaki and a Japanese press contingent, who reported the event back home, with photographs of his bloodied face subsequently appearing in Japanese weekly magazines. The incident became widely reported in Japan, and Gracie later traveled to Tokyo and showed the Japanese press a recording of the fight, countering claims that Anjo had been attacked by multiple people.

The incident intensified Gracie's rivalry with the UWFi and the Japanese shoot wrestling scene, and the desire of UWFi's wrestlers and fans to see Gracie face one of their leading representatives eventually contributed to a long-awaited matchup with UWFi star Nobuhiko Takada at the inaugural Pride Fighting Championships event in 1997. The rivalry between the Gracie family and Japanese shoot wrestlers subsequently continued through Kazushi Sakuraba, a student of Takada, who defeated several members of the Gracie family and became known as the "Gracie Hunter".

A year later, Gracie was invited again to the next Vale Tudo Japan. In the first round he faced shoot style professional wrestler and mixed martial artist Yoshihisa Yamamoto from Fighting Network Rings, who unlike Gracie's previous opponents managed to keep him away from the mat by using the ropes and even tried a guillotine choke. However, Gracie eventually took him down and choked him. He squared against another pro wrestler in the form of Koichiro Kimura, swiftly defeating him, then met shootist Yuki Nakai at the finals. Nakai, who was almost blind from an earlier match against Gerard Gordeau, put up strong resistance to Gracie, but Gracie managed to take his back and choke him for another tournament win.

Rickson did not compete at Vale Tudo Japan 1996, as he felt the event had stagnated and failed to grow as he had hoped. However, he did not want to turn his back on the organizers and instead he sent his brother Royler Gracie to represent the family.

=== Pride Fighting Championships ===
In 1997, Gracie signed up to a fight against Yoji Anjo's superior Nobuhiko Takada in the Pride 1 event. Before the Tokyo Dome's 47,860 spectators, Gracie defeated the inexperienced Takada, mounting him and locking an armbar in 4:47.

Now enjoying a growing popularity in Japan, according to Gracie he was proposed to fight Mario Sperry at Pride 3, but the process was stopped due to Carlson Gracie's disavowal. Pride management also offered him to take Royce Gracie's place in his cancelled match with Mark Kerr, but he refused, citing one month to be a too short time to prepare. Fighting Network Rings's chairman Akira Maeda also challenged Gracie and proposed a fight as his own retirement match, but it was rejected. Gracie only agreed to sign up to a rematch against Takada at Pride 4, stating: "I feel Takada is a warrior and deserves the chance to try and redeem himself."

In their rematch, Takada had improved and was able to wrestle Gracie to neutralize his groundwork advantage, but Gracie used a failed leglock attempt from the Japanese to sweep him and mount him. Nonetheless, Takada kept fighting under the jiu-jitsu master, dismounting him and threatening with a heel hook attempt, but Gracie, who was waiting until the end of the round to prevent Takada from capitalizing should he miss his opportunity, applied an armbar and submitted him again.

In May 2000, after Takada understudy Kazushi Sakuraba defeated Royler Gracie in the Pride 8 event, he took the mic and challenged Gracie, who was in the Gracie corner, but nothing came of it. Gracie preferred to face Pancrase's retired ace Masakatsu Funaki at Colosseum event. The event almost got cancelled, as Gracie demanded special rules which banned headbutts, elbow strikes, and strikes to the head both standing or on the ground, but an agreement was reached when the Pancrase management conceded to ban headbutts and elbows.

At the event, held at the Tokyo Dome and broadcast to 30 million TV Tokyo viewers, Gracie and Funaki started the fight clinching to the corner. Masakatsu appeared to have secured a guillotine choke, but the hold was loose and Gracie managed to go to the mat, although receiving a hammerfist that marked his face. They traded kicks to no effect, until some well timed upkicks from Gracie blew out Funaki's gravely injured right knee. They clinched again, but the Japanese's injury rendered him unable to wrestle Gracie correctly, and he was taken down by the Brazilian, who promptly mounted him. Masakatsu looked stunned while Gracie bloodied his face with ground and pound, and finally Gracie forced his way into a rear naked choke. During the post-match interview, Gracie claimed that the hammerfist delivered by Funaki made him lose his eyesight for a few moments.

After the Colosseum event, Gracie expressed interest in fighting judo medalist Naoya Ogawa, who was signed up for the next Colosseum event. He was also proposed by Pride management to fight Kazushi Sakuraba, who had already defeated Royce Gracie as well, but Gracie refused saying that Sakuraba "didn't have the spirit of a warrior". Gracie further said he didn't want to fight a wrestler who was so much smaller than him. Thus, New Japan Pro-Wrestling invited him to face Shinya Hashimoto, Manabu Nakanishi or Kazuyuki Fujita, but they were refused. The fight against Ogawa was set to the next year, with Naoya vacating his NWA World Heavyweight Championship to focus on training for the bout.

However, tragedy struck when Gracie's son Rockson was found dead in January 2001. Affected by the loss, Gracie contemplated retirement, and the fight against Ogawa fell off after some negotiations. Months later, he stated he was willing to fight again and evaluating propositions, but nothing came from it. When the matchup with Sakuraba was brought up again, Gracie expressed disinterest.

=== Other appearances ===
In August 2002, Gracie had a special appearance in Japanese media helping out Ogawa before his bout against Matt Ghaffari at the UFO Legend event, in which he assisted. After the event, Ogawa talked again about a fight against Gracie, which Gracie considered as possible return match. Gracie also mentioned Antônio Rodrigo Nogueira and Kazuyuki Fujita as candidates to fight him in said return. However, nothing of it came to fruition, even after UFO president Tatsuo Kawamura proposed creating an event in order to hold the match.

In 2003, Antonio Inoki offered Gracie USD$5 million for a fight against Fujita, but it had no answer.

After the match between Royler Gracie and Genki Sudo in 2004, the latter challenged Gracie. Producer Sadaharu Tanikawa tried to put together a bout between both, but he was unsuccessful. Three years later, after Kazushi Sakuraba defeated Masakatsu Funaki, Tanikawa also tried to promote a bout between Sakuraba and Gracie in 2008, with the same results. In 2010, Gracie conceded the fight with Sakuraba fight would be "the best fight in [his career]", but stated he was retired from professional fighting.

On July 21, 2014, Gracie appeared on episode #524 of The Joe Rogan Experience podcast hosted by Joe Rogan.

In November 2014 he became an inductee of the Legends of MMA Hall of Fame, alongside Big John McCarthy, Pat Miletich, and Fedor Emelianenko.

== In other media ==
Gracie was the subject of the 1995 documentary, Choke, by filmmaker Robert Goodman. The documentary followed Gracie and two other fighters (Todd Hays and Koichiro Kimura) as they prepared and fought in Tokyo's Vale Tudo Japan 1995. Released by Manga Entertainment, the film has been distributed to 23 countries. Gracie had a small role in The Incredible Hulk as Bruce Banner's aikido instructor, despite his jiu-jitsu background. He has appeared on National Geographic's television programme Fight Science.

In 1998, Gracie made the cover of Karaté Bushido, the oldest magazine dedicated to martial arts in Europe, joining martial artists such as Bruce Lee (1974), Jean-Claude Van Damme (1993), Bas Rutten (1997), Jackie Chan (2000), Fedor Emelianenko (2007), Georges St-Pierre (2008), Jérôme Le Banner (2012), Francis Ngannou (2019), and Dave Leduc (2020).

On May 8, 2020, news surfaced that a Netflix film about Rickson Gracie in production. The film is directed by José Padilha and the role of Gracie is played by Cauã Reymond. The film was targeted for release in the second half of 2021. It is yet to be released and no additional information has been given.

== Controversies ==
=== Criticism of other fighters ===
Gracie raised the ire of some in the MMA community by criticizing the abilities of top fighters. In 1996, speaking about Ultimate Fighting Championship tournament winners, he labelled Don Frye and Mark Coleman as "very weak", and said that the latter "would offer no danger." He also saw Wallid Ismail as an "average fighter," Kazushi Sakuraba as "not a fighter that has a great expertise in anything" and "lucky all the time," and Marco Ruas as "nothing special" and "basic". Ruas, who was known for challenging Gracie to a fight several times in his career, was quoted in return as: "Talk is cheap. He has to step up in the ring and prove what he says."

Though he had not fought in a sanctioned MMA contest in eight years, Gracie claimed in 2008 that he could still beat the current top fighters easily. In an interview with Tokyo Sports, Gracie argued that Fedor Emelianenko was a great athlete, but possessed "so-so" technical ability, and that he (Gracie) was "100% sure" that he could defeat him. Two years after, Gracie stated that he disagreed with those who view Emelianenko as "somehow special" and that he believed Emelianenko deserved to lose the decision in his fight with Ricardo Arona; described Brock Lesnar as having "zero defense from the bottom" in the fight against Carwin; and criticized Shane Carwin for what he perceived were deficiencies in Carwin's jiu-jitsu game, characterizing him as "strong as a bull but flimsy like a paper tiger." Previous critical comments that Gracie made about Antônio Rodrigo Nogueira (claiming that Nogueira had "no guard") prompted Wanderlei Silva to say that Gracie is "living in a fantasy world" and launch a new challenge to him.

=== Fighting record ===
His father Hélio Gracie disputed Rickson's claim to have had over 400 fights. According to Hélio, Rickson has only competed in fights that are commonly known and reported: the two against Rei Zulu and those that took place in Japan. Helio Gracie alleged that Rickson uses practice and amateur bouts to obtain a number over 400, and that if he counted his fights like Rickson does, he would have in excess of one million.

Footage does exist of Rickson competing against his cousin Rigan Machado in a jiu-jitsu match in 1986, in what was one of the first public matches between members of the family. He also competed in sambo and submitted several competitors in a tournament. However, these were not no holds barred or mixed martial arts fights, and as such would count towards his records in jiu-jitsu and sambo instead of his fighting record.

Rickson's only official loss in martial arts competition was at the 1993 U.S. Sambo Championships in Norman, Oklahoma. Rickson, claiming to be a gold medalist at 1980 Pan American Sambo Championships at 74 kilograms, faced judo and sambo champion Ron Tripp. Tripp threw Gracie to the canvas by uchi mata in 47 seconds, thus giving Tripp absolute victory under FIAS international sambo rules. Rickson disputed this loss, claiming he was misinformed of the rules of the event, despite claiming to be a two-time Pan American champion in sambo.

== Personal life ==
Gracie has four children; Rockson Gracie (deceased), Kauan, Kaulin and Kron Gracie. His son Rockson died of a drug overdose in December 2000; Gracie was scheduled to fight Naoya Ogawa that year, but the event was canceled and Gracie never fought professionally again.

Gracie announced in an interview on June 21, 2023 that he was diagnosed with Parkinson's disease in 2021.

== Rickson Gracie United ==
In August 2026, Rickson Gracie announced the launch of Rickson Gracie United, "an international affiliation of Jiu-Jitsu clubs, schools, and academies committed to following and helping to spread Rickson Gracie's unique approach to expressing and teaching Jiu-Jitsu."

== Mixed martial arts record ==
Professional record breakdown
11 matches	11 wins	0 losses
By knockout	2	0
By submission	9	0

Res.	Record	Opponent	Method	Event	Date	Round	Time	Location	Notes
Win	11–0	Masakatsu Funaki	Technical Submission (rear-naked choke)	C2K: Colosseum	May 26, 2000	1	12:49	Japan	Special rules: Knee and elbow strikes were forbidden.
Win	10–0	Nobuhiko Takada	Submission (armbar)	Pride 4	October 11, 1998	1	9:30	Tokyo, Japan	
Win	9–0	Nobuhiko Takada	Submission (armbar)	Pride 1	October 11, 1997	1	4:47	Tokyo, Japan	
Win	8–0	Yuki Nakai	Submission (rear-naked choke)	Vale Tudo Japan 1995	April 20, 1995	1	6:22	Tokyo, Japan	
Win	7–0	Koichiro Kimura	Submission (rear-naked choke)	Vale Tudo Japan 1995	April 20, 1995	1	2:07	Tokyo, Japan	
Win	6–0	Yoshihisa Yamamoto	Technical Submission (rear-naked choke)	Vale Tudo Japan 1995	April 20, 1995	3	3:49	Tokyo, Japan	
Win	5–0	Bud Smith	TKO (Submission to punches)	Vale Tudo Japan 1994	July 29, 1994	1	0:39	Urayasu, Chiba, Japan	
Win	4–0	Dave Levicki	TKO (Submission to punches)	Vale Tudo Japan 1994	July 29, 1994	1	2:40	Urayasu, Chiba, Japan	
Win	3–0	Yoshinori Nishi	Submission (rear-naked choke)	Vale Tudo Japan 1994	July 29, 1994	1	2:58	Urayasu, Chiba, Japan	
Win	2–0	Rei Zulu	Submission (rear-naked choke)	Independent promotion	January 1, 1984	1	9:00	Rio de Janeiro, Brazil	
Win	1–0	Rei Zulu	Submission (rear-naked choke)	Independent promotion	April 25, 1980	1	11:55	Brasília, Brazil	

== Jiu-jitsu record ==
Result	Opponent	Method	Event	Date	Round	Time	Notes
Win	(Brazil) Joe Moreira	Submission (Choke)	V Copa Company - Absolute	1988			
Win	(Brazil) Joe Moreira	Submission (Choke)	V Copa Company - Light Heavyweight	1988			
Win	(Brazil) Rigan Machado	Submission (Rear-naked choke)	Independent promotion	1986			
Win	(Brazil) Murilo Sa	Submission (Armbar)	Copa Cantao	1986			
Win	(Brazil) Rigan Machado	Submission (Exhaustion)	III Copa Company	1986			
Win	(Brazil) Otavio Peixotinho	Submission (Armbar)	LINJJI	1984			
Win	(Brazil) Sergio Penha	Submission (Choke)	AABB	1981			
Win	(Brazil) Sergio Penha	Submission (Armbar)	AABB	1981			

== See also ==
- List of Brazilian jiu-jitsu practitioners
- List of undefeated mixed martial artists
