= North–south choke =

Grappling choke

North-South Choke
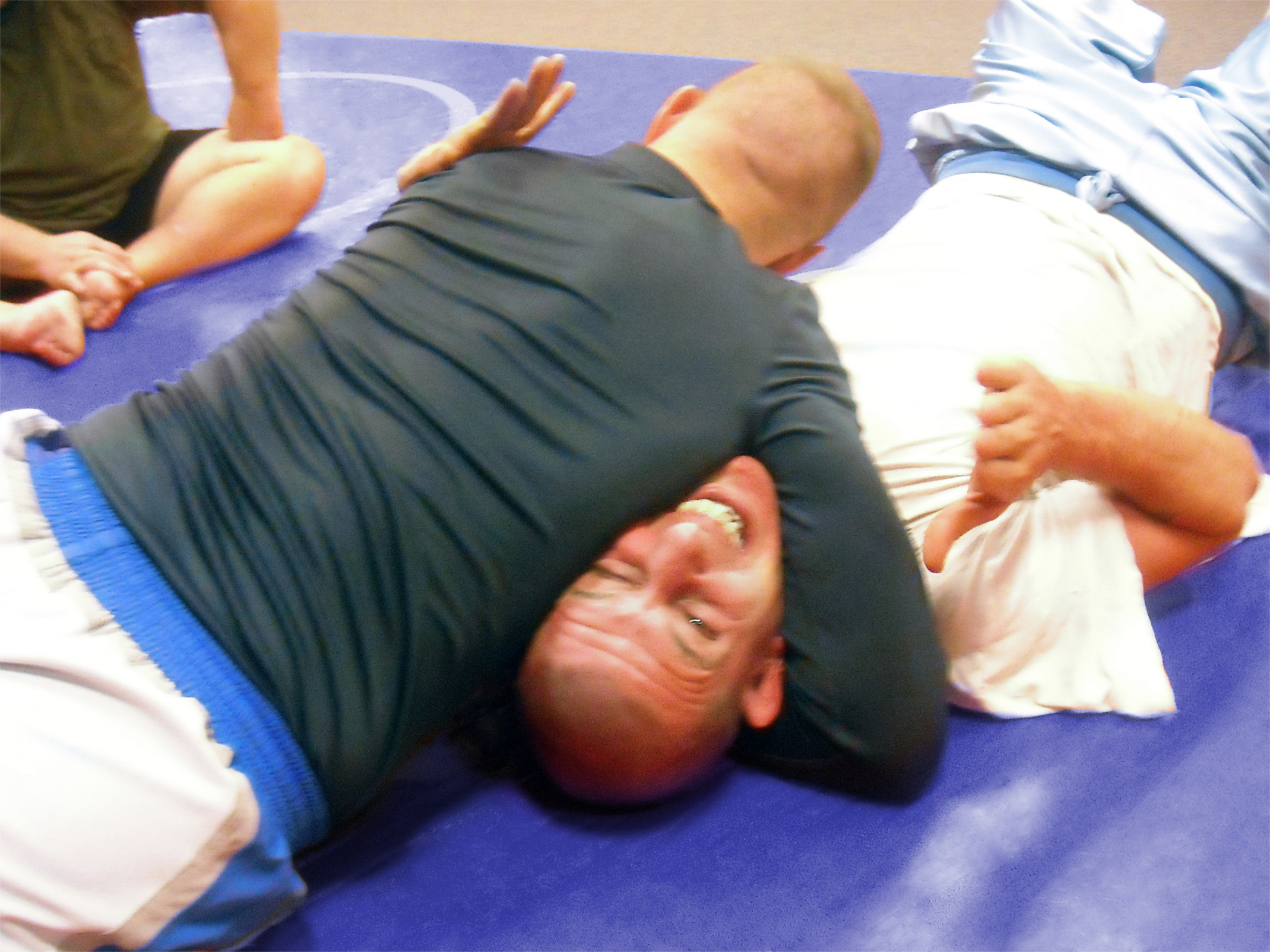
- 5th Degree Pancrase Black belt Jerry Roeder demonstrates the North–south choke.
- Classification: Chokehold
- Style: Brazilian Jiu-Jitsu
- AKA: Kami-shiho-gatame
- Parent hold: North-south position

The North–south choke is a choking technique in grappling, employed exclusively from the north–south position, and classified as an air choke-hold. It closely resembles one of the seven mat holds, or osaekomi-waza, of Kodokan Judo, Kuzure kami shiho gatame. This technique is comparable in procedure to the D’arce choke, except that the practitioner is 180 degrees opposite their opponent.

== Technique description ==
When a practitioner is in north-south position, (with opponent lying supine, practitioner is prone, positioned 180 degrees their opposite, contacting the opponent chest-to-chest), the practitioner will encircle the opponent’s neck with either arm. The practitioner then uses the ribcage or side adjacent the arm that encircles the opponent’s neck to trap the opponent’s head so that avoiding the choke is less possible. The practitioner will then clasp their hands together, in a Gable grip, palm-to-palm, with hands in 90-degree variation one from another. Almost simultaneously, the practitioner will sprawl their hips backward and down, to circumvent any danger from sweeps. To finish the submission the practitioner will lower the shoulder that corresponds to the arm that encircles the opponent’s neck, reducing the supply of oxygen to the brain, by constricting the carotid artery.

== Use in combat sports ==
Notable mixed martial artists who have utilized the choke include Jeff Monson, Rani Yahya, Mike Russow and Jimmy Ambriz. As of 2016, Monson has 17 victories that have come by way of north-south choke. The north-south choke is also commonly used in grappling only events; one of the most notable grapplers to use the choke with great success is Brazilian jiu-jitsu black belt, Marcelo Garcia. At least 4 of his 55 (approximately 7%) victories have come by north-south chokes. Recent studies have shown that the north-south choke takes an average time of 9.4 seconds to render an opponent unconscious once applied correctly.

== Safety concerns ==
The practice of applying this or any chokehold to a human being is extremely dangerous if used improperly or recklessly. Extended periods of choking deprive the brain of oxygen, leading to unconsciousness and ultimately brain damage or death if not released. It is imperative, when practicing such techniques, that practitioners be completely aware of their opponent's physical state, and release the choke at any sign of the opponent losing consciousness or "tapping out."

== See also ==
- North–south position
- Arm triangle choke
- Chokehold
