= Side control =

Grappling position

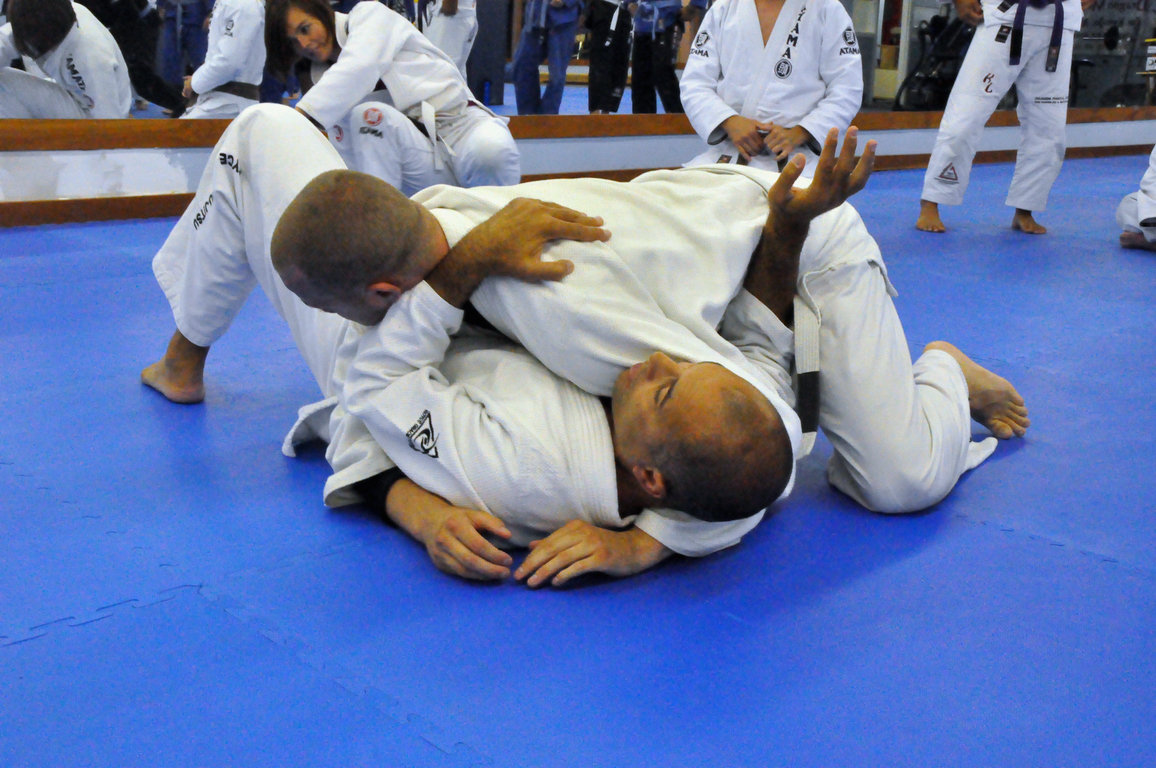
- Royce Gracie demonstrating defense from the side control position.
- Classification: Position
- Style: Judo, Brazilian Jiu Jitsu
- AKA: Side mount, cross mount, yoko shiho gatame
- Child hold(s): Knee-on-stomach
- Attacks: Key-lock
- Counters: Sweeps

In grappling, side control, often also called side mount or cross mount, is a dominant ground grappling position where the top combatant is lying perpendicularly over the face-up bottom combatant in such a way that the legs are free and they exert no control over the combatant on the bottom. The top combatant is referred to as having side control, and is in a stable position, with the other combatant pinned beneath them. From there the top combatant can proceed with elbows, knees, various submissions, or transition into a mounted position. It is high priority for the bottom combatant to sweep the top combatant or otherwise escape the position, for instance by entangling the opponent's free legs and trying to obtain the half guard or guard.

== Kata-gatame ==
The kata gatame (肩固, "shoulder hold") is a pinning hold where the opponent is hugged around the head, with one of the opponent's arms pinned against their neck. It can be done from kesa-gatame in response to an opponent's escape attempt, during which the arm is pinned against their neck, and the hold around the neck is put in place. The kata-gatame is often seen as a chokehold, since it is easy to compress the opponent's neck from the hold by squeezing, in which case it is known as an arm triangle choke or side choke.

== Kesa-gatame ==
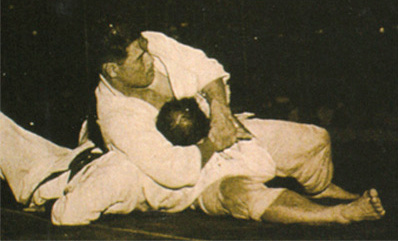
Kesa gatame applied by Masahiko Kimura

Kesa gatame (袈裟固, also referred to as hon-kesa-gatame, 本袈裟固) or "scarf hold" is a pinning hold that is performed from side control by turning slightly sideways, spreading the legs for stability, and encircling the opponent's head with one arm and holding the other arm close to the chest. Transitions and submission holds are comparatively difficult to perform effectively from this position, instead a variation of this hold is used called kuzure-kesa-gatame (崩袈裟固) or "modified scarf hold". This hold is similar to the kesa-gatame, except that instead of encircling the head, the opponent's arm is encircled. Kodokan Judo also classifies the commonly used techniques ushiro-kesa-gatame and makura-kesa-gatame as kuzure-kesa-gatame.

== Twister Side-Control ==
Twister side control, also known as reverse scarf hold, is a variation of traditional side control. Ideal twister side control is achieved from traditional side control by facing away from the opponents head, sitting on their bicep, placing the small of your back on their chin and trapping their other arm behind your elbow, pushing it towards their head. A key component to twister side control is keeping your hip off the ground, this is important to help keep weight down on the opponent. This will leave you with a free hand that you can use to block the opponents legs from attacking or keep posture. Twister side control is usually known as a position which favors attacking the legs. However, the upper body can be attacked with submissions such as the baby arm, kimura, d'arce, etc. In addition, the tip-toe transition to mount is an extremely high percentage pass and considered one of the easiest in jiu-jitsu. Twister side control is named after the a transition, from the position, which enables you to transition to the truck and perform a twister a.k.a. guillotine, but it also allows you to attack for kneebars and calf cranks.

== See also ==
- Grappling
- Back mount
- Guard
- Half guard
- Knee-on-stomach
- Mount
- North-south position
