= Knee-on-stomach =

Grappling position

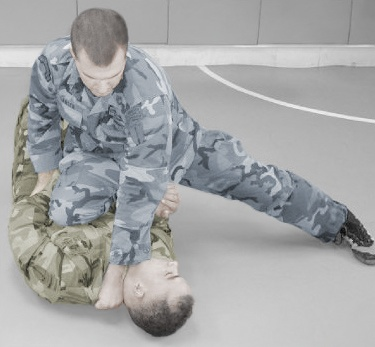
- Knee-on-stomach is sometimes seen as a relatively unstable position.
- Classification: Position
- Style: Jujutsu, Judo, Brazilian Jiu-Jitsu, Catch wrestling
- AKA: Knee-on-belly, knee-on-chest, knee-ride, knee mount and uki-gatame, floating hold, Neon Belly
- Parent hold: Side Control
- Child hold(s): floating knee-on-belly, pressure knee-on-belly
- Attacks: Striking, Armbar
- Counters: Sweeps

Knee-on-stomach, or knee-on-belly, knee-on-chest, knee-ride, knee mount (uki-gatame, 浮固, "floating hold" in budō), is a dominant ground grappling position where the top combatant places a knee on the bottom combatant's torso, and usually extends the other leg to the side for balance. This position is typically obtained from side control, simply by rising up slightly and putting a knee on the opponent's stomach or chest.

== Use ==
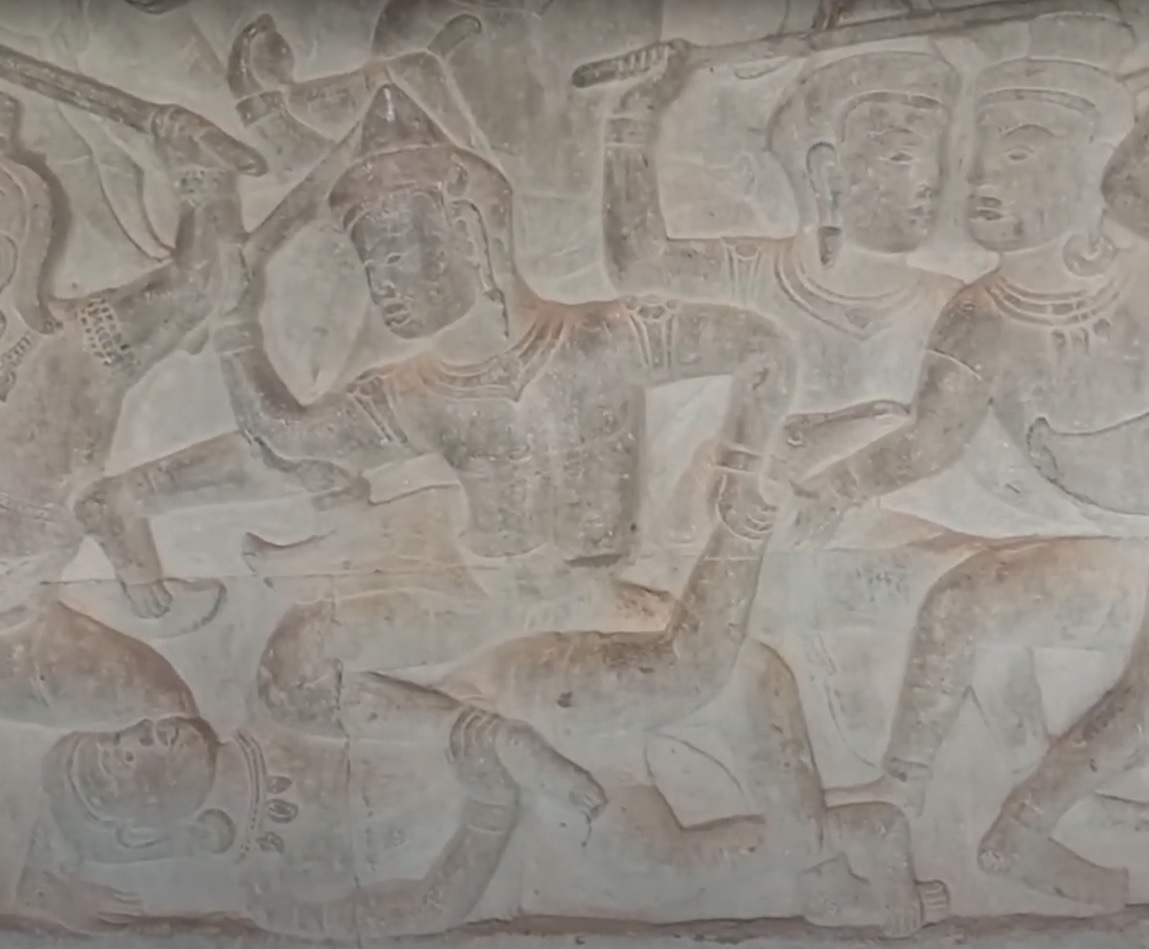
Bas-relief of knee mount. Located at Angkor Wat(1100's A.D.) in the Kingdom of Cambodia.

Knee-on-stomach is an advantageous position, where the top combatant can effectively strike similarly to in the mounted position, and also transition into various holds or other positions, and also easily disengage and escape if needed. It is not however considered as stable as the mount, which on the other hand complements the knee-on-stomach well, since it is possible to easily transition from one to another in response to escape or sweep attempts by the opponent. A common submission hold applied from this position is the juji-gatame armbar, which can be performed if the opponent extends their hands in an attempt to push the top combatant off. The top combatant can sometimes submit the bottom combatant from this position by simply using their weight to compress the torso, hence causing pain and compressive asphyxia.

== See also ==
- Back mount
- Guard
- Half guard
- North-south position
