= Mount (grappling) =

Position in grappling

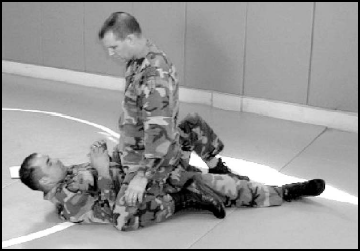
- The mounted position is considered one of the most dominant grappling positions.
- Classification: Position
- Style: Judo, Jiu-Jitsu
- AKA: full mount
- Child hold(s): high mount, low mount, S-mount, knee mount, reverse mount, tate shiho gatame

The mount, or mounted position, is a dominant ground grappling position, where one combatant sits on the other combatants torso (usually lower) with the face pointing towards the opponent's head. This is a favorable position for the top combatant in several ways. The top combatant can generate considerable momentum for strikes (such as punches or elbows) to the head of the opponent, while the bottom combatant is restricted by the ground and by the combatant on top. Other advantages include various chokeholds and joint locks that can be applied from the top. The bottom combatant will usually look to sweep the opponent or transition into a better position such as the guard.

== Variations of the mount ==
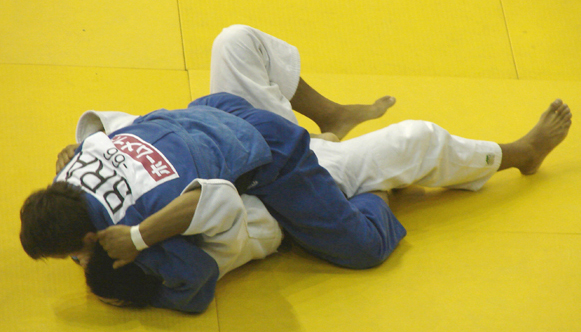

A mount which is very high up on the opponent's chest is referred to as a high mount, and a very low one on the abdomen or even thighs as a low mount. A high mount can be used to pin one of the opponents arms under the knee, so as to prevent him or her from defending effectively. This however might increase the risk of the opponent being able to escape the back door, in which he or she is able to move under the opponent and escape the mount. A too low mount on the other hand will result in the opponent being able to sit up, and possibly reverse the position into an open guard with him or her on top. Another variation of the mount is the unusual reverse mount, in which the top combatant's face is towards the legs of the opponent. Such a position can be used to transition into various leglocks. There is also the S-Mount where one knee slides next to the opponent's head while the other leg is curled under the opponent's armpit (for the legs to form an S) which adds additional pressure to opponent's ribcage and can be used to set up more advanced chokes and arm locks.

== Attacks from the mount ==
=== Strikes from the mount ===
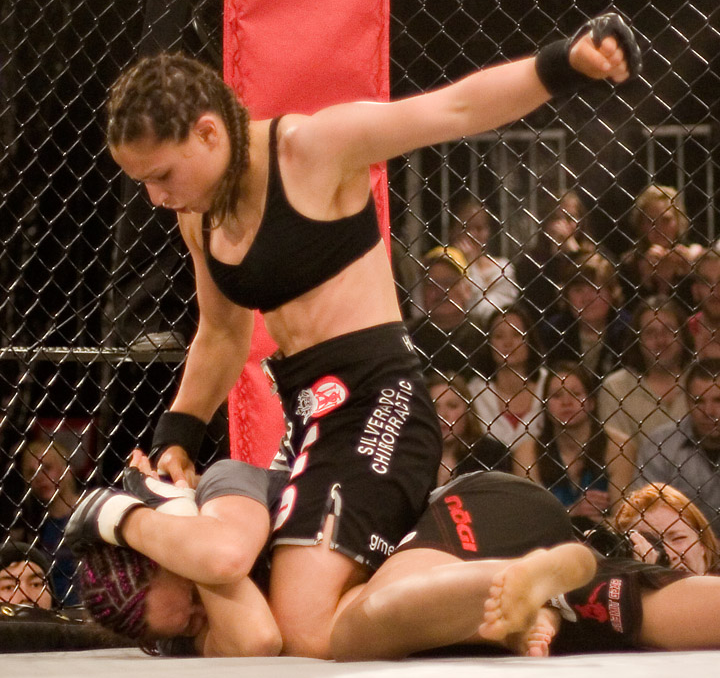
Strikes from mount position in an MMA fight

For those sports that allow striking from the mounted position, such as mixed martial arts, the most common strikes are punches to the face and head. Elbow strikes are also commonly used, and knee strikes are sometimes seen. In addition to punching the head, strikes to the ribs and chest can also be difficult to defend and thus effective.

=== Submissions from the mount ===
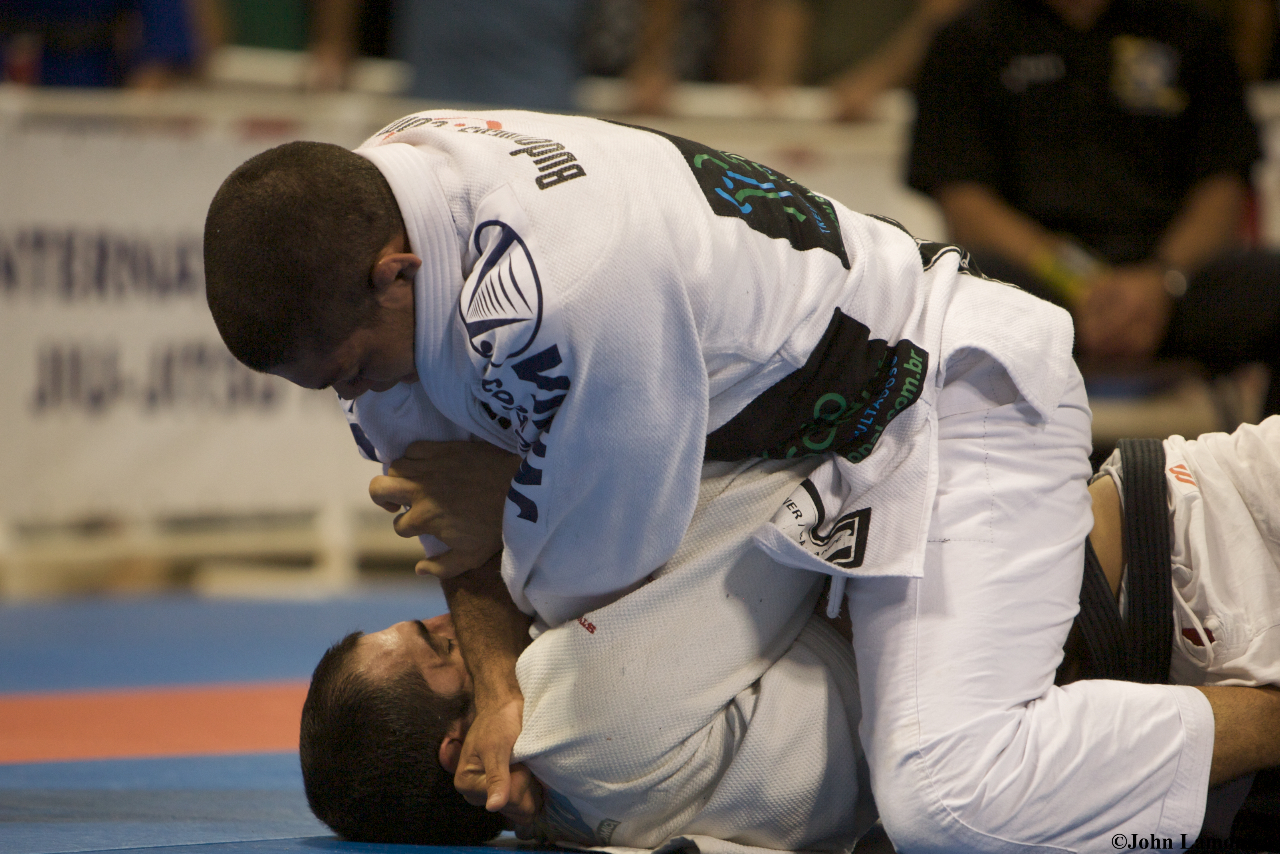
A choke applied from the mount

The mounted position is ideal for applying a variety of armlocks. By trapping the opponent's arm against the ground, the combatant in mount can easily apply a keylock, known in judo as ude-garami and in BJJ as either Kimura (medial keylock) or Americana (lateral keylock). If the bottom combatant attempts to push the top one off by extending one or both arms and pushing, the opponent can transition into a juji-gatame armbar.

Many chokes, especially collar chokes, are also available from the mounted position. Such chokes are generally limited to sporting contestants who wear a gi or, in real-life combat, opponents wearing thick jackets, which provide a collar as an aid to choking, but attempting them at a gi-less situation can be successful if the performer manages to hold his opponent.

Other submissions such as the Triangle Choke, Arm Triangle and the Gogoplata can be used from the mount but are less common.

=== Pinning holds from the mount ===
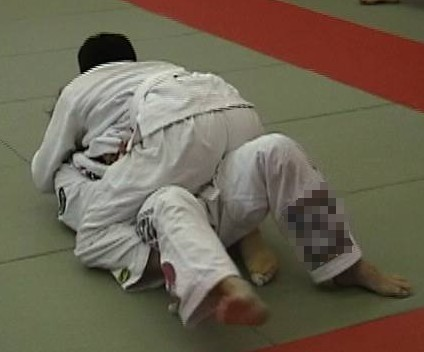

Pinning holds in budō from the mount include tate shiho gatame (縦四方固, "horizontal four quarters hold", also called hon-tate-shiho-gatame, 本縦四方固), which is similar to kata-gatame except that it is performed from the mount. The opponent's arm is pinned against his or her neck, and the head and arm are held tightly. This may result in a potent arm triangle choke. In its variations kuzure-tate-shiho-gatame (崩縦四方固, "modified horizontal four quarters hold"), the arm is not held against the neck, but rather, one of the arms may be held. The stability of these pinning holds or the mount in general, can be increased by entangling the opponents legs with the own legs, a technique known as grapevining.

== Defending from the bottom ==
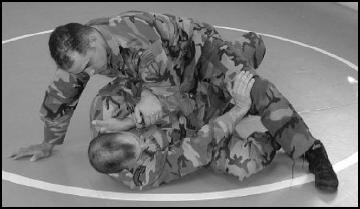
Escaping the mount by creating space and pulling a leg through.

It is critical for the bottom practitioner to be able to defend a mount by an opponent. Typical escapes include the back door escape (escaping by moving under the opponent) or bridging (also called the upa escape; escaping by thrusting the hips upwards and to the side). For the bridging escape, also known as the Bridge and Roll Escape, to be successful, the practitioner typically must trap the arm and perhaps also block the foot of the opponent on top on the side to which the practitioner wants to roll prior to or during the bridge and roll movement. This prevents the opponent from posting to stop the roll. An alternative also commonly used is the elbow escape, also referred to as the shrimp or shrimping, this involves using the elbows or hands to create space in between the opponent and the practitioner so that the practitioner can work one leg, then the other in between himself and his opponent, hence obtaining the half guard, or full guard. Another option for the defending practitioner is to rotate the body so that the face points downwards. This will however place the practitioner in a very disadvantageous position, defending the back mount, but it is possible to escape while turning, if the opponent has not yet stabilized the position. By simultaneously escaping the back door, or by standing up in an attempt to dislodge the opponent, a practitioner may successfully escape. Still another technique is for the defending practitioner to sweep his opponent, thereby moving from a defensive position to neutral one, or in a best-case scenario a dominant position.

== See also ==
- Back mount
- Guard
- Half guard
- Knee-on-stomach
- North-south position
- Side control
