= Kiran Uniyal =

Indian martial artist (born 1973)

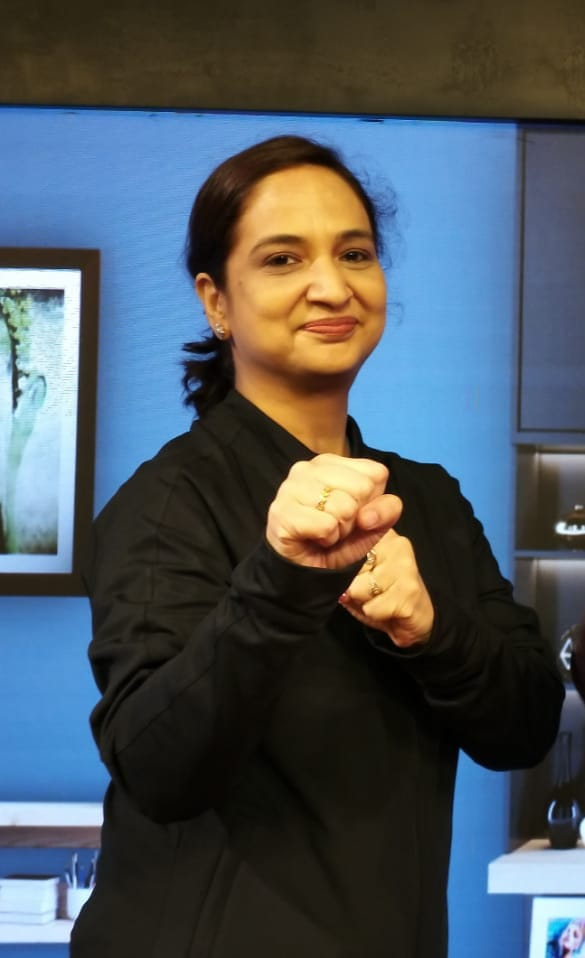
- Born: 24 July 1973 (age 52)
- Other names: Kiran Deoli Uniyal
- Occupations: Martial arts motivator, practitioner and social worker.
- Known for: Martial Arts
- Notable work: Know Your Martyrs Families (campaign); Empowering Divyangjan (book)
- Spouse: Sunil Uniyal
- Children: 2
- Awards: Guinness World Record (various)

Kiran Uniyal is an Indian martial artist, educator, and author.

== Early life ==
Uniyal first got involved with taekwondo when she was a teenager, and then picked it up again as an adult.

== Career ==
Uniyal is the first Indian woman to set 34 martial arts speed records, specializing in elbow strikes and kicks. She also holds the female world record for the most full-contact punch strikes in one hour, achieving an impressive 28,234 strikes.

According to the Guinness World Records, on 9 April 2022, she executed 590 full-contact punch strikes using 1-kilogram weights in one minute. Later, on 23 April 2022, she completed 579 full-contact elbow strikes using a single elbow in three minutes.

Earlier, Uniyal set multiple records in the women’s category, including:

- Most full-contact knee strikes in one minute, with 120 strikes and
- Most full-contact knee strikes in three minutes using one leg, with 263 strikes.

She also holds the Guinness World Record for the most full-contact elbow strikes with one hand in three minutes, totaling 466 strikes.

Beyond martial arts, Uniyal has actively contributed to social initiatives. On Army Day in 2017, she helped organize a blood donation camp that collected 3,704 units of blood.

She initiated the Know Your Martyrs’ Families campaign, an initiative aimed at raising awareness and support for the families of Indian martyrs. Additionally, she co-authored the book Empowering Divyangjan: A Compendium of Benefits and Facilities for the Differently Abled Children of the Armed Forces, which outlines resources available for disabled children in military families.

== Family life ==
Outside of her professional achievements, Uniyal is also a devoted wife and mother of two.
