= Asphyxia =

Severely deficient supply of oxygen

- Other names: Asphyxiation
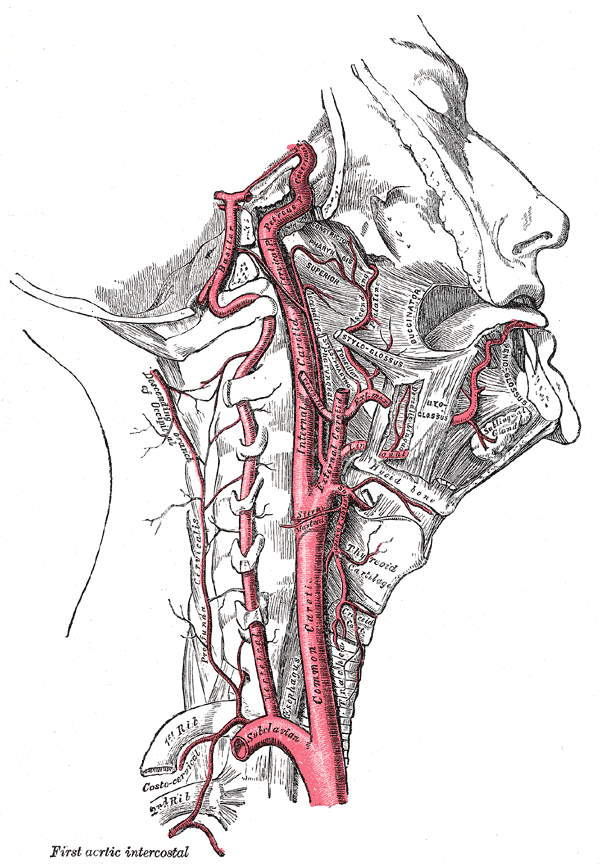
- The neck contains several vulnerable targets for compression, including the carotid arteries and the trachea.
- Specialty: Critical care medicine
- Complications: Coma, muteness
- Frequency: 9.8 million unintentional worldwide (2015)
- Deaths: 35,600 worldwide (2015)

Asphyxia or asphyxiation is a condition of deficient supply of oxygen to the body which arises from abnormal breathing. Asphyxia causes generalized hypoxia, which affects all the tissues and organs, some more rapidly than others. There are many circumstances that can induce asphyxia, all of which are characterized by the inability of a person to acquire sufficient oxygen through breathing for an extended period of time. Asphyxia can cause coma or death. In 2015, about 9.8 million cases of unintentional suffocation occurred, which resulted in 35,600 deaths. The word asphyxia is from Ancient Greek α- "without" and σφύξις sphyxis, "squeeze" (throb of heart).

== Causes ==
Situations that can cause asphyxia include but are not limited to: airway obstruction, as from asthma, laryngospasm, or simple blockage by foreign material; being in an environment where oxygen is not readily accessible, such as underwater, in a low oxygen atmosphere, or in a vacuum; and being in an environment where sufficiently oxygenated air is present, but cannot be adequately breathed because of air contamination such as excessive smoke.

Other causes of oxygen deficiency include but are not limited to:

- Acute respiratory distress syndrome
- Alcohol poisoning
- Carbon monoxide inhalation, as from a car exhaust or cigarette smoke: carbon monoxide has a higher affinity than oxygen to the hemoglobin in the blood's red corpuscles, bonding with it tenaciously, and, in the process, displacing oxygen and preventing the blood from transporting it around the body
- Contact with certain chemicals, including pulmonary agents (such as phosgene) and blood agents (such as hydrogen cyanide)
- Choking by obstruction of a foreign body in the airway (for example: when eating)
- Cyanide poisoning
- Drowning
- Drug overdose
- Exposure to extreme low pressure or vacuum from spacesuit damage (see space exposure)
- Hanging, whether suspension or short drop hanging
- Self-induced hypocapnia by hyperventilation, as in shallow water or deep water blackout and the choking game
- Inert gas asphyxiation
- Congenital central hypoventilation syndrome, or primary alveolar hypoventilation, a disorder of the autonomic nervous system in which a patient must consciously breathe; although it is often said that people with this disease will die if they fall asleep, this is not usually the case.
- Respiratory diseases
- Sleep apnea
- A seizure which stops breathing activity
- An allergic reaction
- Strangling
- Breaking the wind pipe
- Prolonged exposure to chlorine gas

=== Smothering ===
Smothering is a mechanical obstruction of the flow of air from the environment into the mouth or nostrils. Smothering can be either partial or complete, where partial indicates that the person being smothered is able to inhale some air, although less than required. In a normal situation, smothering requires at least partial obstruction of both the nasal cavities and the mouth to lead to asphyxia. Smothering with the hands or chest is used in some combat sports to distract the opponent, and create openings for transitions, as the opponent is forced to react to the smothering.

In some cases, when performing certain routines, smothering is combined with simultaneous compressive asphyxia. One example is overlay, in which an adult accidentally rolls over onto an infant during co-sleeping, an accident that often goes unnoticed and is mistakenly thought to be sudden infant death syndrome.

Other accidents involving a similar mechanism are cave-ins, or when an individual is buried in sand, snow, dirt, or grain.

In homicidal cases, the term burking describes a killing method that involves simultaneous smothering and compression of the torso. The term "burking" comes from the method William Burke and William Hare used to kill their victims during the West Port murders. They killed the usually intoxicated victims by sitting on their chests and suffocating them by putting a hand over their nose and mouth, while using the other hand to push the victim's jaw up. The corpses had no visible injuries, and were supplied to medical schools for money.

=== Compressive asphyxia ===
Compressive asphyxia (also called chest compression) is mechanically limiting expansion of the lungs by compressing the torso, preventing breathing. "Traumatic asphyxia" or "crush asphyxia" usually refers to compressive asphyxia resulting from being crushed or pinned under a large weight or force, or in a crowd crush. An example of traumatic asphyxia is a person who jacks up a car to work on it from below, and is crushed by the vehicle when the jack fails. Constrictor snakes such as boa constrictors kill through slow compressive asphyxia, tightening their coils every time the prey breathes out rather than squeezing forcefully. In cases of an adult co-sleeping with an infant ("overlay"), the heavy sleeping adult may move on top of the infant, causing compression asphyxia.

In fatal crowd disasters, compressive asphyxia from being crushed against the crowd causes all or nearly all deaths, rather than blunt trauma from trampling. This is what occurred at the Ibrox disaster in 1971, where 66 Rangers fans died; the 1979 The Who concert disaster where 11 died; the Luzhniki disaster in 1982, when 66 FC Spartak Moscow fans died; the Hillsborough disaster in 1989, where 97 Liverpool fans were crushed to death in an overcrowded terrace, 95 of the 97 from compressive asphyxia, 93 dying directly from it and 3 others from related complications; the 2021 Meron crowd crush where 45 died; the Astroworld Festival crowd crush in 2021, where 10 died; and the Seoul Halloween crowd crush in 2022, where at least 159 died during Halloween celebrations.

In confined spaces, people are forced to push against each other; evidence from bent steel railings in several fatal crowd accidents has shown horizontal forces over 4500 N (equivalent to a weight of approximately 450 kg or 1000 lbs). In cases where people have stacked up on each other in a human pile, it has been estimated that those at the bottom are subjected to around 380 kg (840 lbs) of compressive weight.

"Positional" or "restraint" asphyxia is when a person is restrained and left alone prone, such as in a police vehicle, and is unable to reposition themself in order to breathe. The death can be in the vehicle, or following loss of consciousness to be followed by death while in a coma, having presented with anoxic brain damage. The asphyxia can be caused by facial compression, neck compression, or chest compression. This occurs mostly during restraint and handcuffing situations by law enforcement, including psychiatric incidents. The weight of the restraint(s) doing the compression may contribute to what is attributed to positional asphyxia. Therefore, passive deaths following custody restraint that are presumed to be the result of positional asphyxia may actually be examples of asphyxia occurring during the restraint process.

Chest compression is a technique used in various grappling combat sports, where it is sometimes called wringing, either to tire the opponent or as complementary or distractive moves in combination with pinning holds, or sometimes even as submission holds. Examples of chest compression include the knee-on-stomach position; or techniques such as leg scissors (also referred to as body scissors and in budō referred to as do-jime; 胴絞, "trunk strangle" or "body triangle") where a participant wraps his or her legs around the opponent's midsection and squeezes them together.

Pressing is a form of torture or execution using compressive asphyxia.

=== Perinatal asphyxia ===
Perinatal asphyxia is the medical condition resulting from deprivation of oxygen (hypoxia) to a newborn infant long enough to cause apparent harm. It results most commonly from a drop in maternal blood pressure or interference during delivery with blood flow to the infant's brain. This can occur as a result of inadequate circulation or perfusion, impaired respiratory effort, or inadequate ventilation. There has long been a scientific debate over whether newborn infants with asphyxia should be resuscitated with 100% oxygen or normal air. It has been demonstrated that high concentrations of oxygen lead to generation of oxygen free radicals, which have a role in reperfusion injury after asphyxia. Research by Ola Didrik Saugstad and others led to new international guidelines on newborn resuscitation in 2010, recommending the use of normal air instead of 100% oxygen.

=== Mechanical asphyxia ===
Accidental deaths in the United States

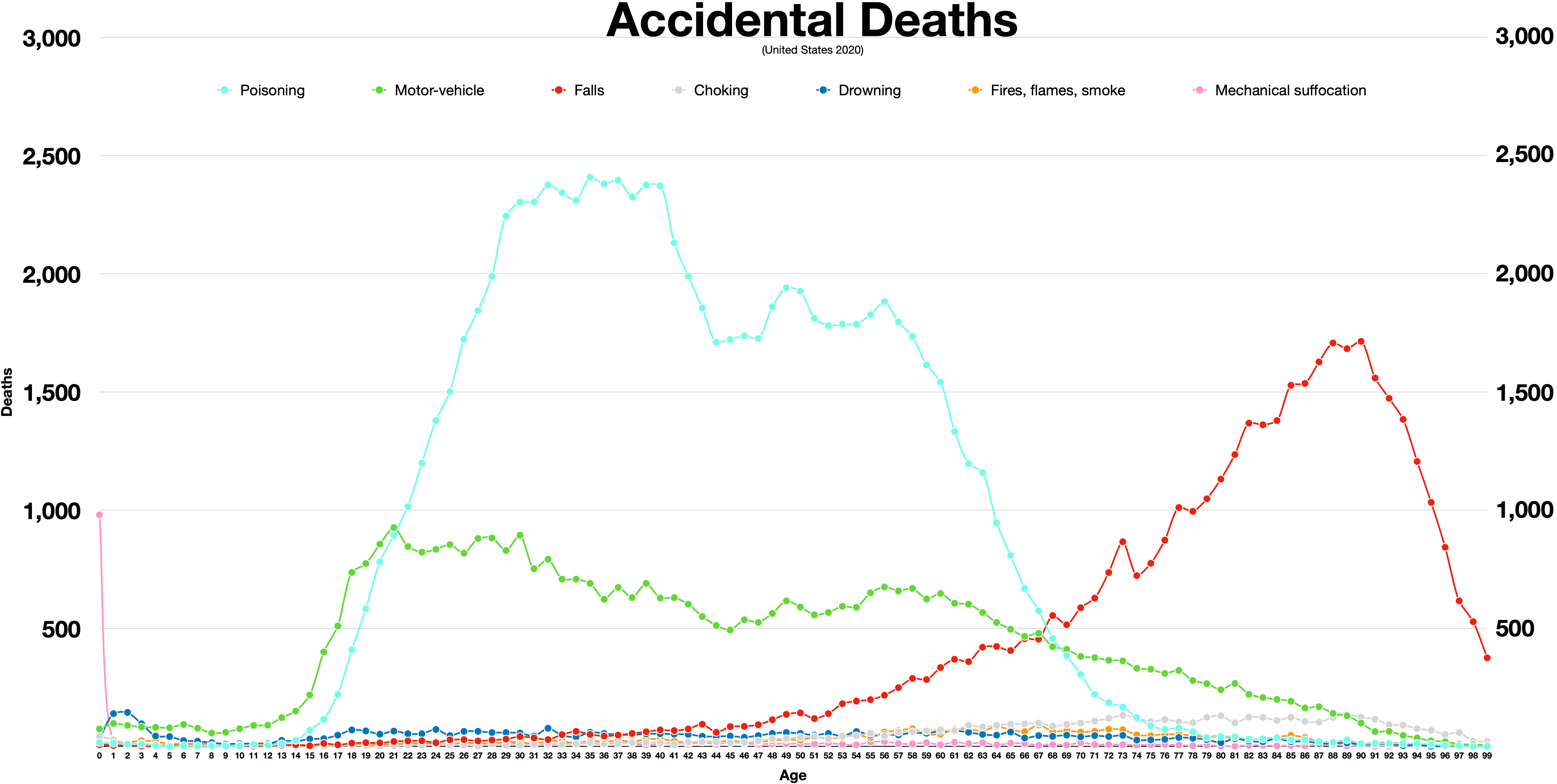
2020

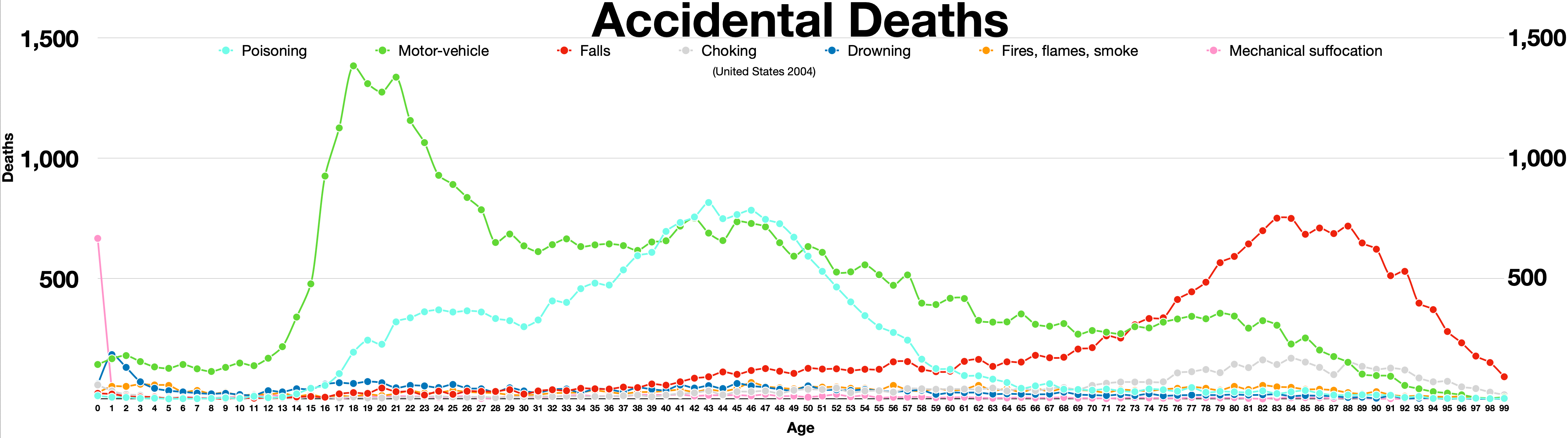
2004

Poisoning
Motor-vehicle
Falls
Choking
Drowning
Fires, flames, smoke
Suffocation

Classifications of different forms of asphyxia vary among literature, with differences in defining the concept of mechanical asphyxia being the most obvious.

In DiMaio and DiMaio's 2001 textbook on forensic pathology, mechanical asphyxia is caused by pressure from outside the body restricting respiration. Similar narrow definitions of mechanical asphyxia have occurred in Azmak's 2006 literature review of asphyxial deaths and Oehmichen and Auer's 2005 book on forensic neuropathology. According to DiMaio and DiMaio, mechanical asphyxia encompasses positional asphyxia, traumatic asphyxia, and "human pile" deaths.

In Shkrum and Ramsay's 2007 textbook on forensic pathology, mechanical asphyxia occurs when any mechanical means cause interference with the exchange of oxygen and carbon dioxide in the body. Similar broad definitions of mechanical asphyxia have occurred in Saukko and Knight's 2004 book on asphyxia, and Dolinak and Matshes' 2005 book on forensic pathology. According to Shkrum and Ramsay, mechanical asphyxia encompasses smothering, choking, positional asphyxia, traumatic asphyxia, wedging, strangulation and drowning.

Sauvageau and Boghossian propose in 2010 that mechanical asphyxia should be officially defined as caused by "restriction of respiratory movements, either by the position of the body or by external chest compression", thus encompassing only positional asphyxia and traumatic asphyxia.

== First aid ==
If there are symptoms of mechanical asphyxia, it is necessary to call the Emergency Medical Services. In some countries, such as the US, there may also be self-acting groups of voluntary first responders who have been trained in first aid. In case of mechanical asphyxia, first aid can be provided on your own.

=== First aid for choking on food ===
In case of choking on a foreign body:

- Stand behind the affected person and wrap your arms around him/her.
- Push inwards and upwards under the ribs with a sudden movement by your second hand.
- If the performed actions were not effective, repeat them until you free respiratory tract of the affected person from a foreign body.

== See also ==
- Asphyxiant gas – Nontoxic or minimally toxic gas which can displace oxygen in breathing air
- Erotic asphyxiation – Intentional restriction of oxygen to the brain for sexual arousal
- Hypercapnia – Abnormally high tissue carbon dioxide levels
- Respiratory acidosis – Decrease in blood pH due to insufficient breathing
