= Half guard =

Grappling position

- A fighter working to pass half guard in Brazilian Jiu-Jitsu sparring
- Classification: Position
- Style: Judo, Brazilian Jiu-Jitsu
- AKA: Turk ride, half mount
- Parent hold: Guard
- Child hold(s): Lock down, Dog fight, knee shield half guard, deep half guard
- Attacks: Calf crush, kimura
- Escapes: sweep

Half guard (or half mount) is a defensive ground grappling position where one combatant is lying on the other, with the bottom combatant having one leg entangled. Sometimes the bottom combatant is said to be in half guard, while the top combatant is in a half mount. In wrestling and catch wrestling half mount is called Turk ride. The half guard is the position that is in between a full guard and side control or full mount. The combatant on top will try to untangle the leg and pass to obtain side control or mount, while the bottom combatant will try to transition into a full guard or alternatively attempt a sweep or submission. The half guard may favour the combatant on top or the guard player, depending on the many details of the position such as body positioning and grips.

== Variations ==
The lockdown (known in judo as niju garami) is a variant of half guard where the defending practitioner further intertwines the legs to achieve a figure four. Using the more extended of their legs, the practitioner traps and drives the foot of the opponent upward; thereby attempting to limit the ability of the opponent to pass to full mount or side control. This position offers a slightly higher likelihood of executing successful sweeps, or reversals, while also offering limited submission options.

Z guard – also known as the 93 guard is a position where the practitioner locks his feet together and clamps down on the opponents thigh while using their top leg knee to exert pressure into the opponents hip. The position is very effective due to the biomechanics involved. The more the top player is pressuring into the top leg the tighter they lock the guard onto themselves while exerting more energy than the bottom player. Z-guard has many defensive characteristics as well as many offensive. It is a solid foundation providing entries into "deep half" and or "half single" as well as traditional half guard techniques. The Z-guard is a must for any practitioner as it creates a strong barrier between you and your opponent with the top knee controlling that distance while there is a push pull effect happening with the bottom leg.

Deep Half guard is when the practitioner uses half guard to get underneath the body of the opponent. Whilst underneath the opponents legs, this position is primarily used for sweeping as it has less submission options but can also be used to enter other positions such as the X-Guard.

== See also ==
- Brazilian Jiu-Jitsu
- Back mount
- Guard
- Knee-on-stomach
- Mount
- North-south position
- Side control
