= North–south position =

Grappling position

North-south
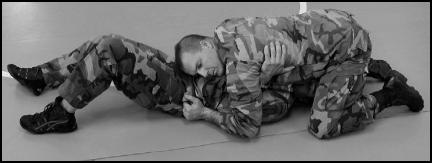
- The north–south position and kami-shiho-gatame.
- Classification: Position
- Style: Jujutsu, Judo, Brazilian Jiu-jitsu,
- AKA: North/South, Four Quarter, Kami-Shiho-Gatame
- Escapes: Circling Bridge / Roll-over

In combat sports, the north–south position (also known as north/south or four quarter) is a ground grappling position where one combatant is supine, with the other combatant invertedly lying prone on top, normally with their head over the bottom combatant's chest. The north–south position is a dominant position, where the top combatant can apply effective strikes such as knee strikes to the head, or easily transition into various grappling holds or more dominant positions. Transitioning into side control can be done by first switching into a particular hold known as ushiro-kesa-gatame (後袈裟固) or reverse scarf hold, where the chest points to the side, and the opponent's arm is controlled similarly to kesa-gatame. The north–south choke is employed exclusively from this position.

== Kami shiho gatame ==
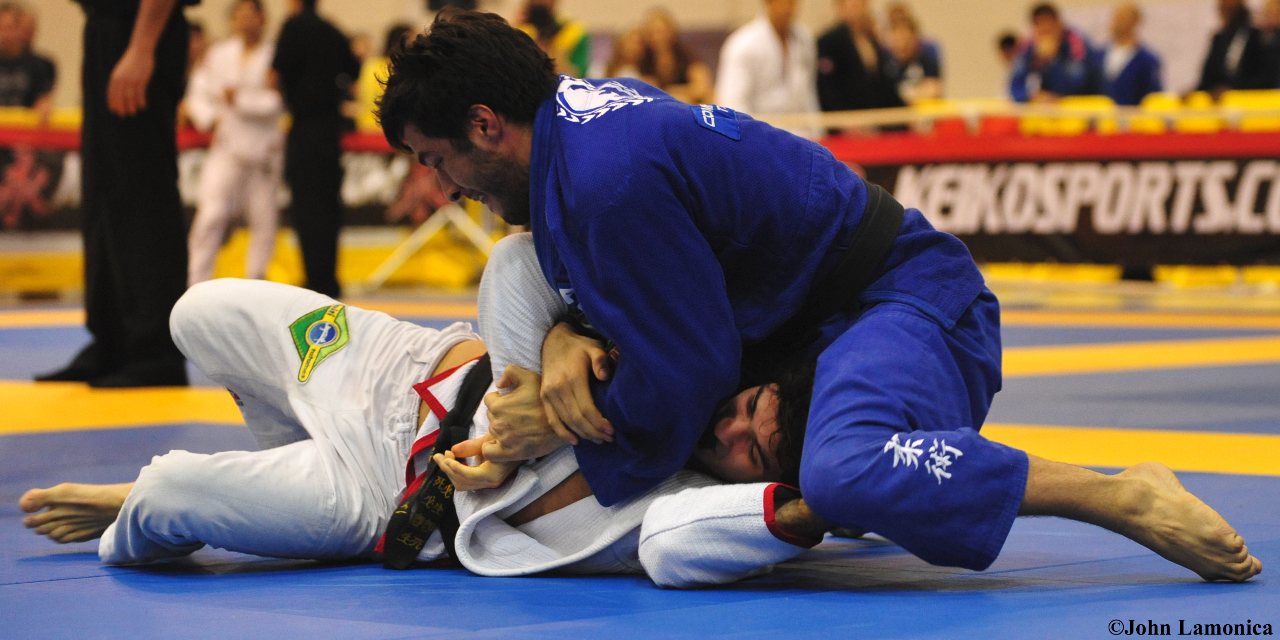
A Brazilian Jiu Jitsu practitioner works north south position in tournament

Kami shiho gatame (上四方固, "upper four quarter hold down"), and its variations kuzure kami shiho gatame (崩上四方固, "broken upper four quarter hold down"), are the most common pinning holds applied from the north–south position in combat sports using a gi. Kami shiho gatame involves pinning the opponent's arms to his or her side, typically by grabbing the opponent's belt and using the arms to press the arms of the opponent inwards. Kuzure-kami-shiho-gatame is similar, except that one or both arms of the opponent aren't pinned to the side, but can be controlled by for instance pinning them in between an upper arm and a knee.

Kami shiho gatame is one of the seven mat holds, Osaekomi-waza, of Kodokan Judo. In grappling terms, it is categorized as a north–south hold.

Shiho gatame is also one of the 25 techniques of Danzan Ryu's constriction arts, Shimete, list.

=== Technique description ===
Graphic from http://judoinfo.com/techdrw.htm

A straight over throw naturally leads to kami shiho gatame.

Exemplar Videos: Demonstrated from https://web.archive.org/web/20060913144731/http://www.abbotsfordjudo.com/techniques/5thkyu.htm Instructional Video

=== Escapes ===
- Ebi (Shrimp) Kami-Shiho-Gatame Escape
- Circling Bridge/Roll-over Kami-Shiho-Gatame Escape

=== Included systems ===
Systems:

- Brazilian Jiu-Jitsu
- Kodokan Judo, Judo Lists
- Danzan Ryu, Danzan Ryu Lists

Lists:

- The Canon Of Judo
- Judo technique

== Similar techniques, variants, and aliases ==
Japanese aliases:

- Sei kami shiho gatame(正上四方固)

English aliases:

- Upper four quarter hold down
- Top four corner hold
- The NSFW(Not Safe For Work) Position

Variants:

- DZR's Shiho-Gatame
- Sitting Kami-Shiho-Gatame
- Embracing Kami-Shiho-Gatame
- Kuzure kami shiho gatame

== See also ==
- Back mount
- Guard
- Half guard
- Knee-on-stomach
- Mount
- Side control
- 69
