= Elbow (strike) =

Strike with the point of the elbow

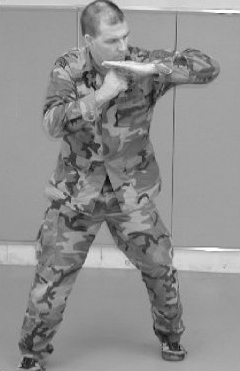
A sideways elbow strike

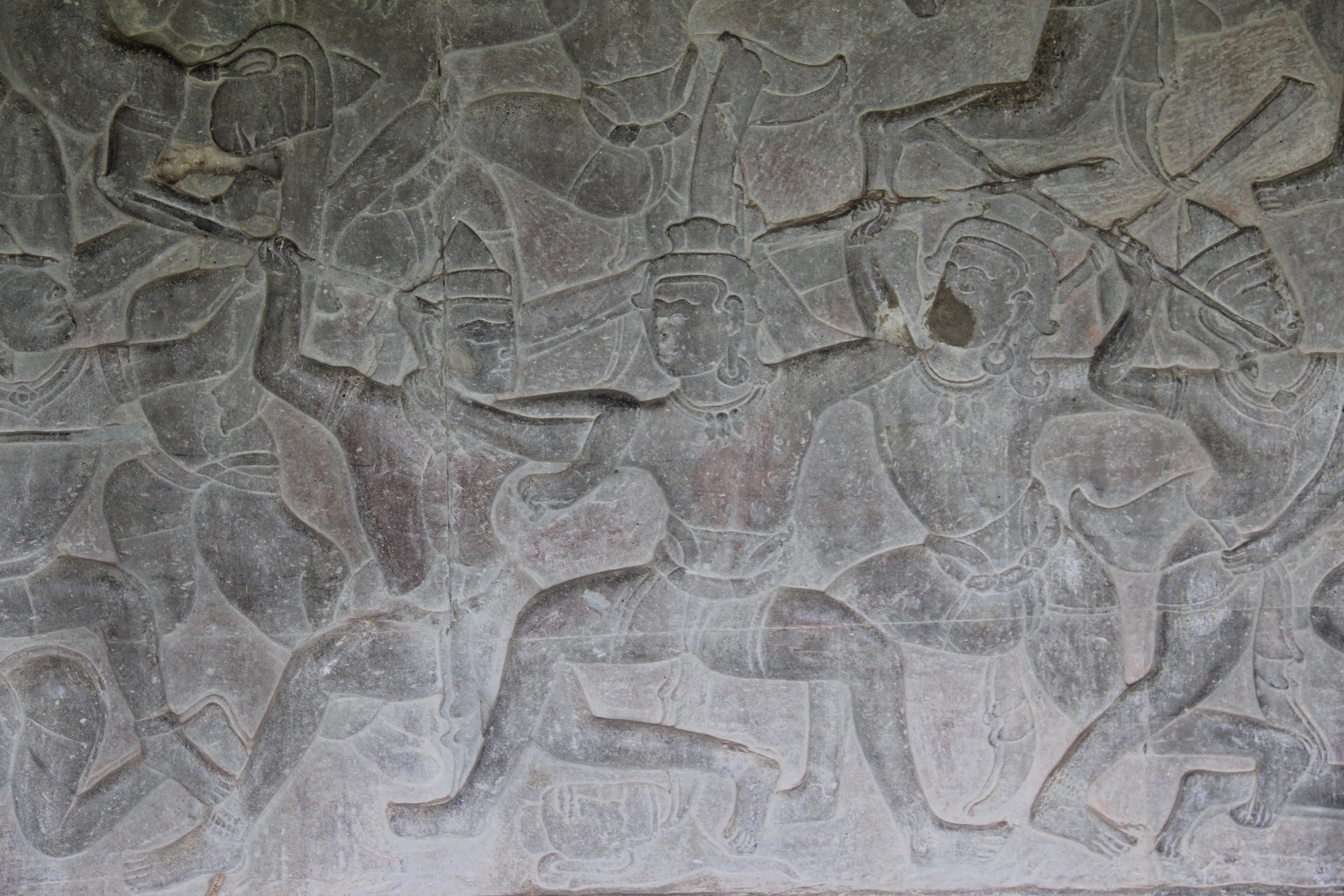
Elbow strike. Bas-relief at Angkor Wat (12th century) in Southeast Asia.

An elbow strike (commonly referred to as simply an elbow) is a strike with the point of the elbow, the part of the forearm nearest to the elbow, or the part of the upper arm nearest to the elbow. Elbows can be thrown sideways similarly to a hook, upwards similarly to an uppercut, downwards with the point of the elbow, diagonally or in direct movement and in several other ways, like during a jump. Elbow strikes are native to traditional Southeast Asian martial arts, traditional Southern Chinese martial arts and traditional Okinawan martial arts.

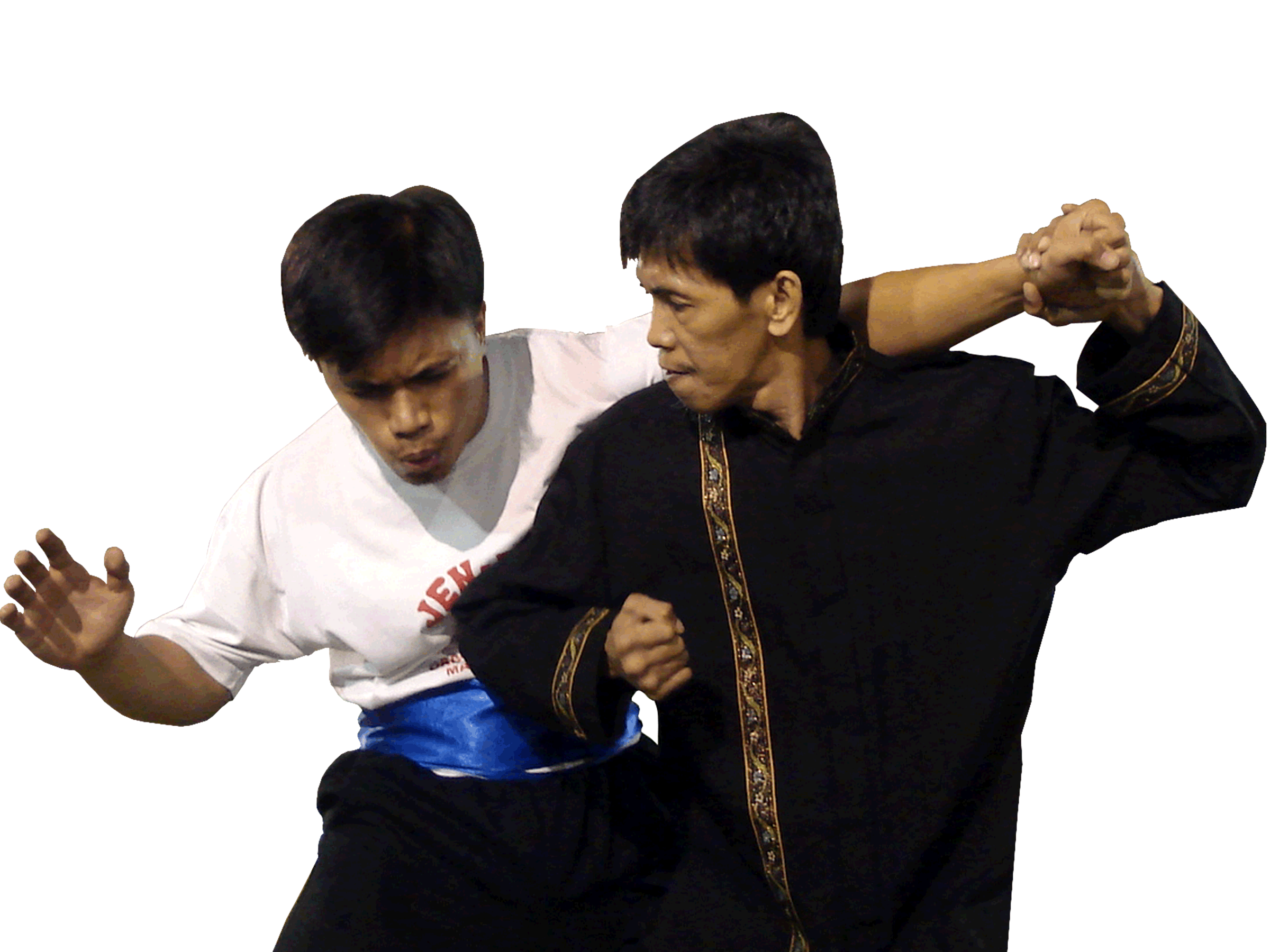
A Bajiquan master using an elbow strike.

Elbowing is a disallowed practice in most combat sports. However, Southeast Asian boxing (Pradal Serey, Muay Thai, Muay Lao, Lethwei) and most mixed martial arts (MMA) organizations do allow elbowing, or allow elbowing in a specific manner. The mixed martial arts organizations disallowing it usually do so because elbowing the head increases the risk of lacerations in a fight.

While elbows are mostly disallowed in most modern combat sports, they are common in traditional martial arts. There are few traditional martial arts that don't use elbows though it depends on which martial art it is, if the elbows are primary or secondary weapons and also in which manner, what tactics and how often they are used. Some well known and respected traditional martial arts that use elbows are Karate, Hung Ga, Bajiquan, Wing Chun, Silat, Lethwei and Muay boran.

In the Southeast Asian boxing art of Muay Thai, elbow strikes are most often used while in close range but are also employed while jumping toward the opponent, similar to Muay Thai's flying knee. The hardness of the elbow allows for hitting with considerable force, and experienced fighters can easily knock out, cut, or injure their opponent with a well-placed strike. Elbows are generally most effective when used in combination with punches or kicks to allow the fighter to close the distance.

Elbows are also used in mixed martial arts as part of the ground-and-pound fighting tactic. Participants often use elbow strikes in conjunction with punches while in the full guard, half guard, side mount, or full mount in order to knock out or overwhelm the opponent.

In ice hockey, elbowing an opposing player is considered a rules infraction, resulting in a two-minute penalty for the offending player, leaving his team short handed. In basketball, elbowing a player, or "throwing 'bows," counts as a foul.

== Injuries ==
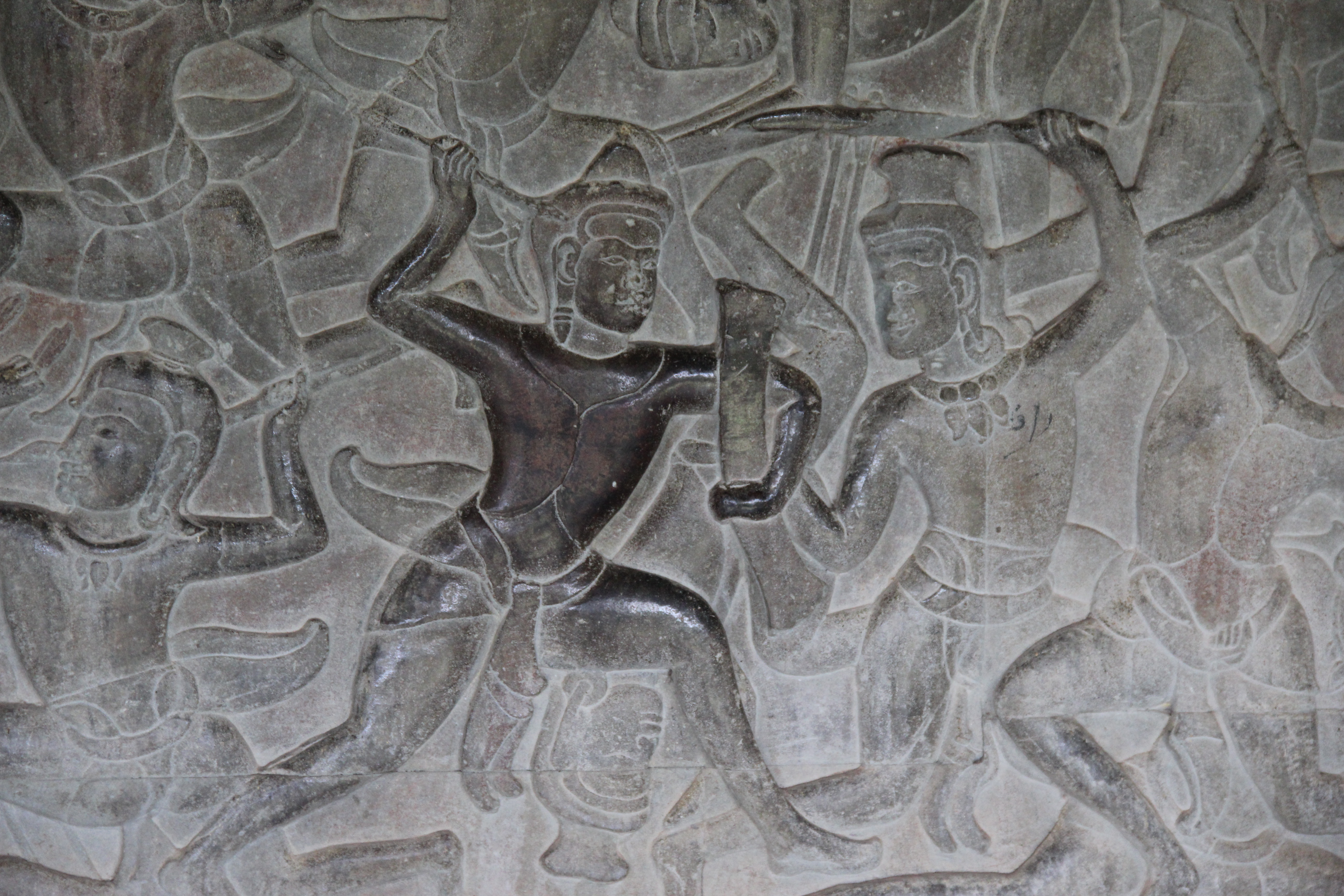
Elbow strike. Bas-relief at Angkor Wat (12th century) in Cambodia.

An improper elbow strike, or an elbow strike without proper conditioning can partially paralyze the striker's hand. The ulnar nerve runs posterior to the elbow (posterior to medial epicondyle of the humerus and innervates the medial portion of the arm). For example, after an improper strike, or if the striker is not properly conditioned, the user may not be able to use the 4th and 5th digit temporarily. There may be a chance for permanent damage to the ulnar nerve with an elbow strike.

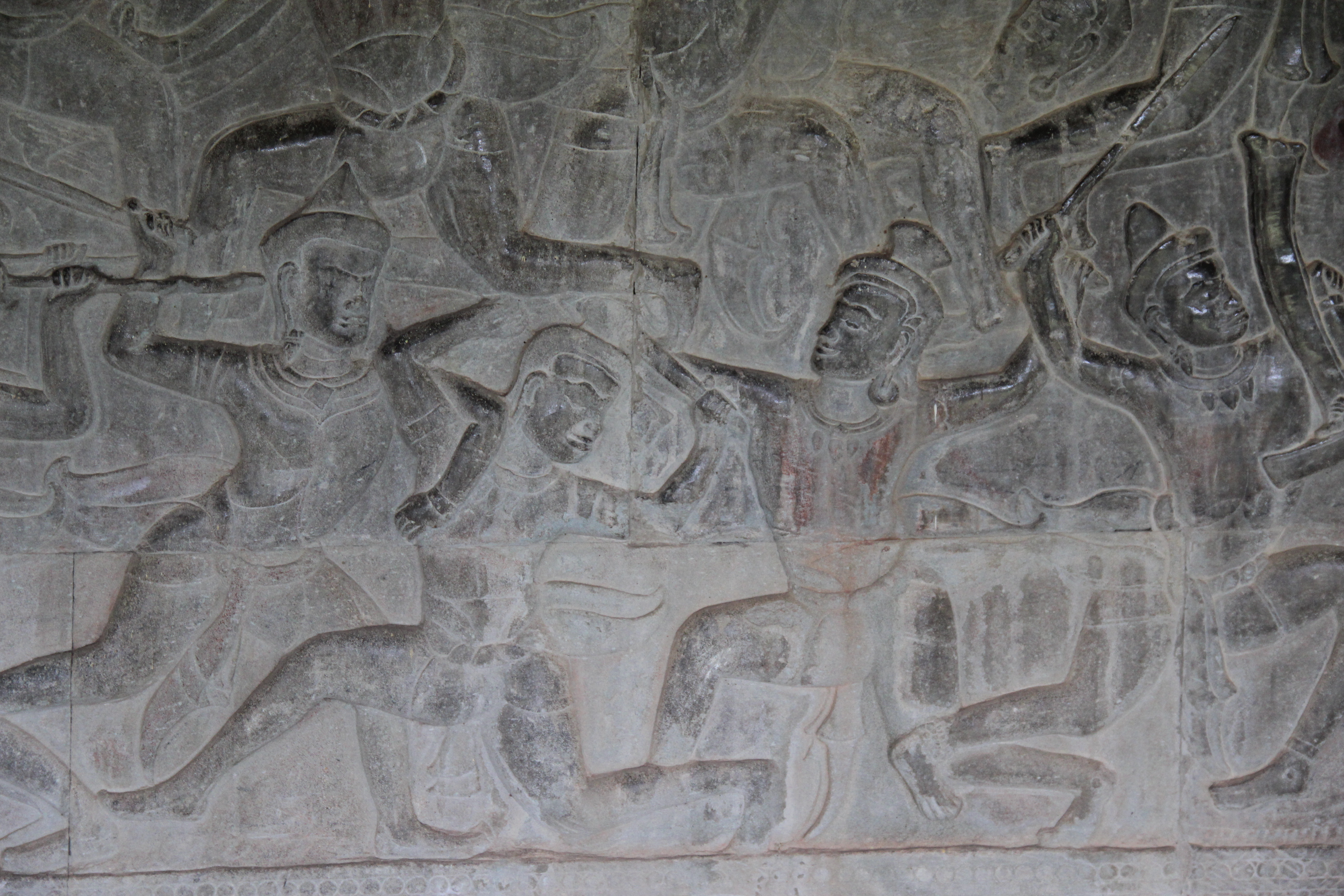
Elbow strike. Bas-relief at Angkor Wat (12th century) in Southeast Asia.

== Conditioning ==
This can be done in several ways, the easiest way is to practice elbow strikes on something like a punching bag, after a few weeks of this regularly one will develop thicker, tougher skin on the elbow resulting in it being harder to cut or tear your skin while delivering elbow strikes. These activities will also make the surrounding tissue harder to bruise due to the buildup of scar tissue in the striking point of the elbow from elbow strikes. It is not recommended to strike solid objects for conditioning as micro-fractures in bone or other tissue tend to be a risk factor for repetitive strains or even more acute problems.

== 12-6 elbow ==
A "12-6 elbow" is a strike that is brought from a high position ("12 o'clock") and travels vertically toward the floor ("6 o'clock"), dropping the point of the elbow directly on the target. This type of elbow used to be illegal in all MMA organizations that use the Unified Rules. Now it is legal.

== See also ==
- Wing Chun
- Bajiquan
- Hung Ga
- Karate
- Muay Lao
- Bokator
- Pradal serey
- Lethwei
