= Guard (grappling) =

Position in grappling

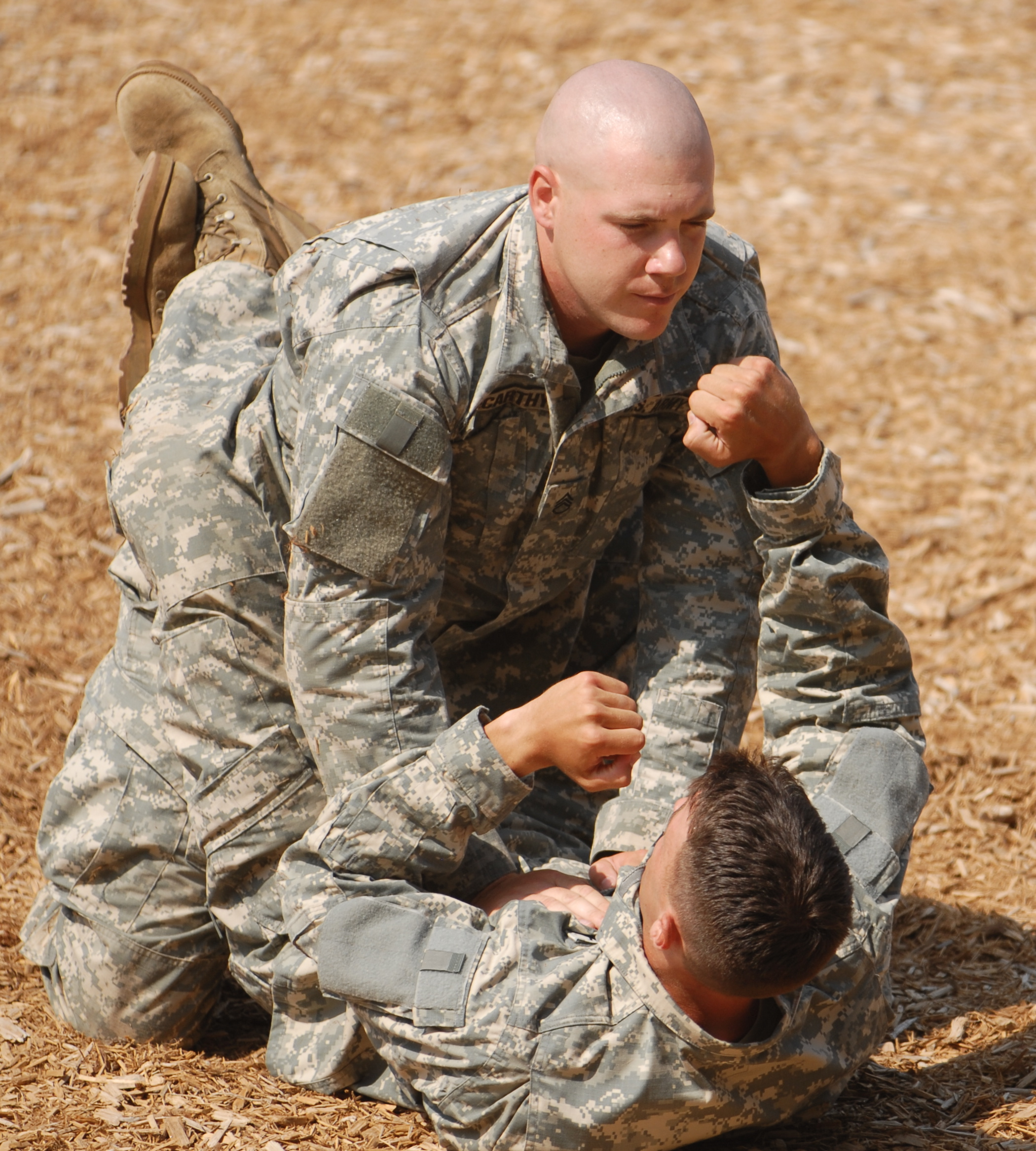
- Standard closed guard, demonstrated by US Army Rangers.
- Classification: Position
- Style: Jujutsu, Judo, Brazilian Jiu-Jitsu
- Child hold(s): closed guard, open guard, half guard

The guard is a ground grappling position in which one combatant has their back to the ground while attempting to control the other combatant using their legs. In pure grappling combat sports, the guard is considered an advantageous position, because the bottom combatant can attack with various joint locks and chokeholds, while the top combatant's priority is the transition into a more dominant position, a process known as passing the guard. In the sport of mixed martial arts, as well as hand-to-hand combat in general, it is possible to effectively strike from the top in the guard, even though the bottom combatant exerts some control. There are various types of guard, with their own advantages and disadvantages.

The guard is a key part of Brazilian Jiu-Jitsu where it can be used as an offensive position. It is also used, but not formally named, in Judo though it is sometimes referred to as dō-osae in Japanese, meaning "trunk hold". (Note: The technique "do-jime" is sometimes incorrectly used to describe the closed guard. The difference is that with do-jime, pressure is applied to squeeze the opponent's trunk to cause asphyxia. Do-jime is a prohibited technique in judo, see IJF Referee Rules (English version).) It is called the "front body scissor" in catch wrestling.

== Pulling Guard ==
Transitioning directly from standing to the guard position is known as pulling guard. Tsunetane Oda, a judo groundwork specialist who died in 1955, demonstrated the technique on video.

== Closed Guard ==
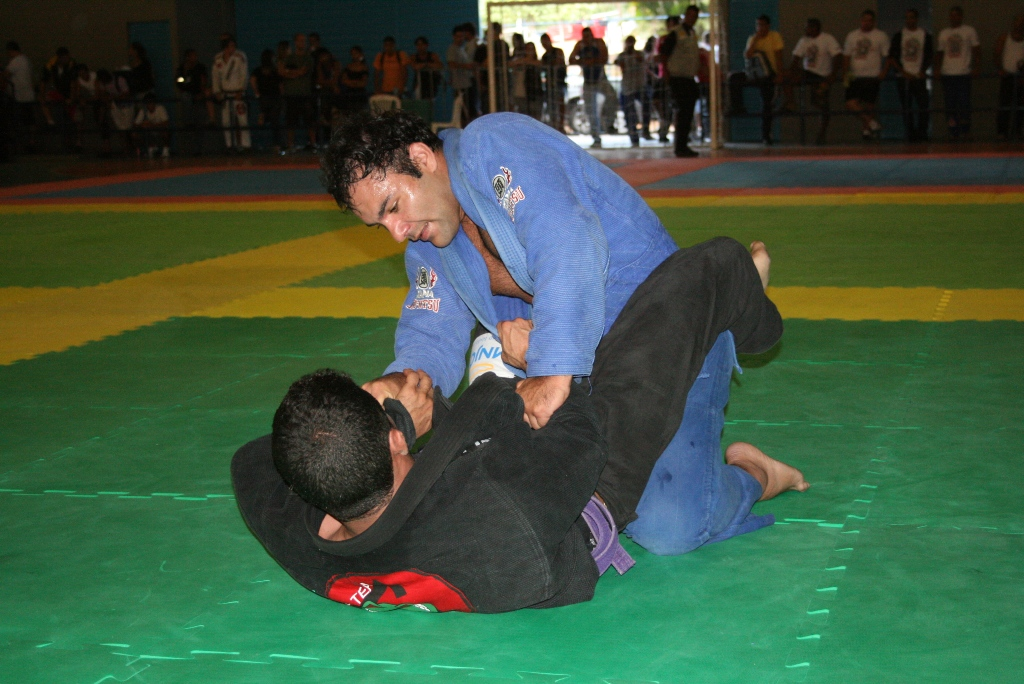
The closed guard

Sometimes referred to as full guard, the closed guard is a common guard position in which the guard player's legs wrap around opponents hips or waist, and their feet are locked (crossed at the ankles). The wrapping legs limit the mobility of the opponent and grant the guard player significant control over the posture of the opponent. For example, by pinching their legs around the opponents hips or waist and bringing them toward their chest, the bottom player can off balance the opponent and pull their upper body forward. The posture control of closed guard enables the guard player to perform a variety of sweeps and and initiate several submission holds. In scenarios with striking, this same control can be effectively utilised to enter a defensive clinch with the opponent.

The closed guard is particularly effective in pure grappling scenarios, where there are very limited attacking opportunities for the top player. In order to escape the closed guard the top player needs to break the lock of the bottom players legs. Manoeuvres intending to break this lock often open the top player to risk of sweeps.

== Half Guard ==
The half guard position

Half guard is a position where the guard player wraps both of their legs around one of their opponent's legs. The half guard can favour the passer or the guard player, depending on the many details of the position such as body positioning and grips. The position affords many options for the guard player to initiate techniques such as sweeps and submission holds.

Variants of half guard include the deep half guard, the Z-guard and the reverse De La Riva guard.

== Open Guard ==
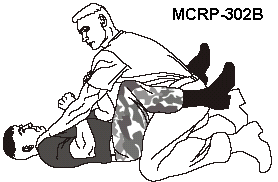
A basic of open guard, as shown in a USMC Close Combat manual

The open guard is typically used to perform various joint locks and chokeholds. The legs can be used to move the opponent, and to create leverage. The open guard allows the opponent to stand up or try to pass the guard, so this position is often used only temporarily to set up sweeps or other techniques. Open guard is also a general term that encompasses a large number of guard positions where the legs are used to push, wrap or hook the opponent without locking the ankles together around them.

=== Butterfly Guard ===
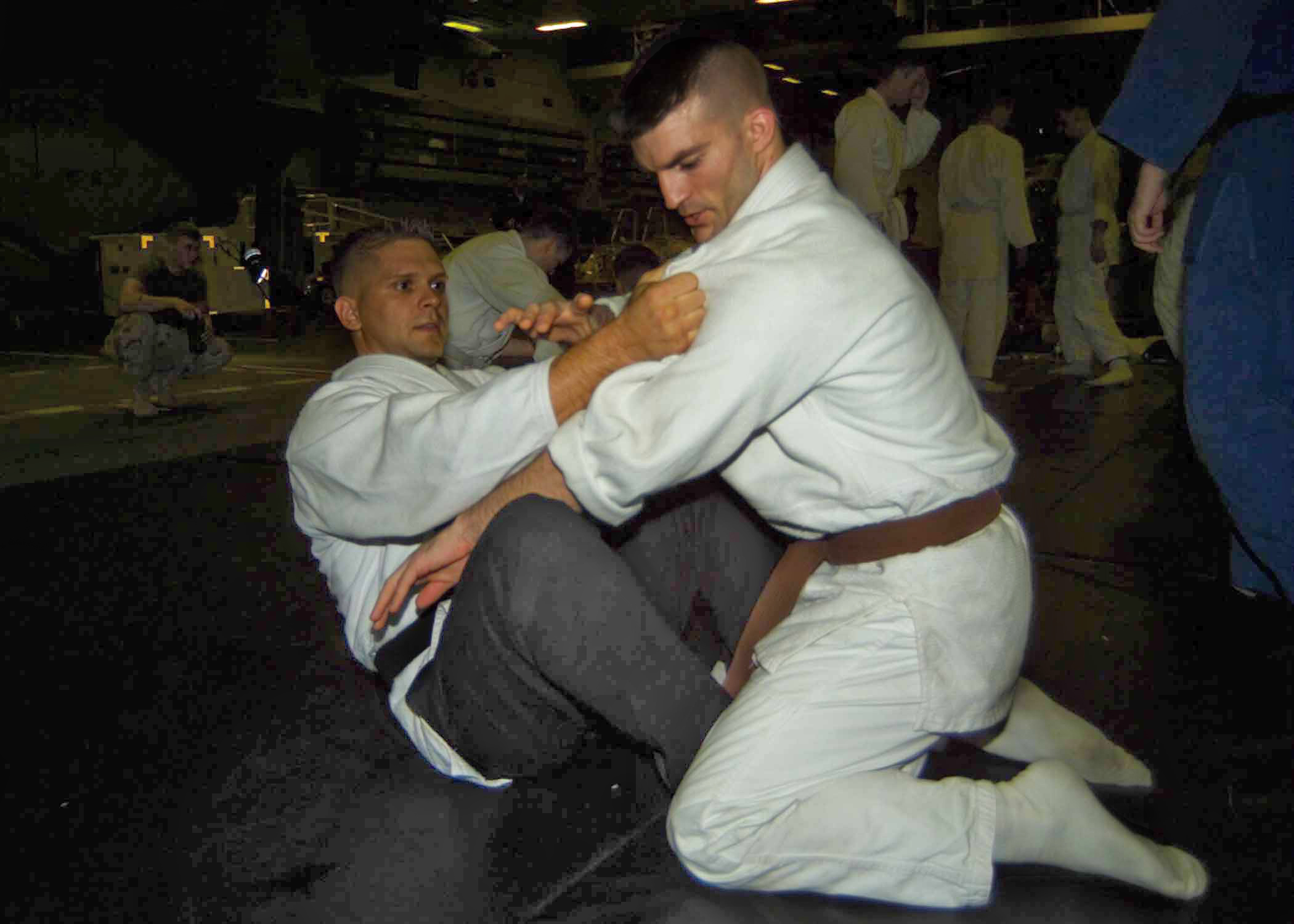
The butterfly guard being used during Judo training. The judogi of the top combatant is grabbed to prevent him from moving away.

The butterfly guard involves both of the legs being hooked with the ankles in between the opponents legs, against the inside of the opponents thighs. The opponent is controlled using both legs and arms. The leverage in the butterfly guard allows powerful sweeps. The guard also allows one to elevate or set the opponent off balance and because of this it is particularly useful in avoiding damage and allows transitions to other dominant positions. The analogous technique in wrestling and catch wrestling is called double elevator.

=== X-Guard ===
The X-guard is an open guard where one of the combatants is standing up and the other is on their back. The bottom combatant uses the legs to entangle one of the opponent's legs, which creates opportunities for powerful sweeps. The X-guard is often used in combination with butterfly and half guard. In a grappling match, this is an advantageous position for the bottom combatant, but in general hand-to-hand combat, the top combatant can attack with stomps or soccer kicks. Likewise, skilled use of the x-guard can prevent the opponent from attempting a kick, or throw them off balance should they raise a leg. The x-guard was developed by Alexandre "Gigi" Paiva [in the 1990's,?] and popularized by Marcelo Garcia.

=== Spider Guard ===
The spider guard comprises a number of positions all of which involve controlling the opponents arms while using the soles of the feet to control the opponent at the biceps, hips, thighs or a combination of them. It is most effective when the sleeves of the opponent can be grabbed. The spider guard can be used for sweeps and to set up joint locks or chokeholds.

=== De La Riva Guard ===
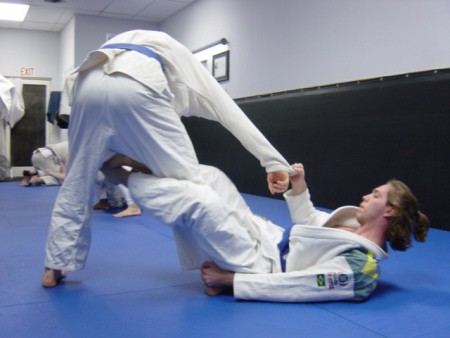
The De la Riva guard being used in Brazilian Jiu-Jitsu training

The De La Riva guard (also called jello guard) is an open guard popularized by Brazilian Jiu-Jitsu practitioner Ricardo De La Riva, who was successful with it in competition. The guard consists of one of the legs wrapped behind the opponent's leg from the outside, the ankle held with one hand, and the other hand grips one of their sleeves. The De La Riva guard offers a number of sweeps, transitions and submissions, and is more recently used in combination with spider guard.

=== Rubber Guard ===
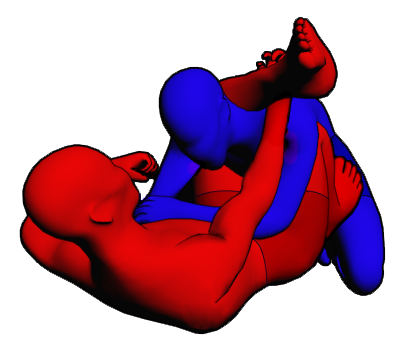
Rubber Guard diagram, a red figure holding blue figure in the rubber guard.

The rubber guard is a position that keeps an opponent down in your guard. The position was used by Brazilian Jiu-Jitsu practitioner Nino Schembri and popularized and made into a system by Eddie Bravo. Many techniques have been developed from this position including sweeps, submissions, and striking defense. By using a leg to hold an opponent down, one arm is free to work on submissions, sweeps or to strike the opponent's trapped head.

=== 50-50 Guard ===
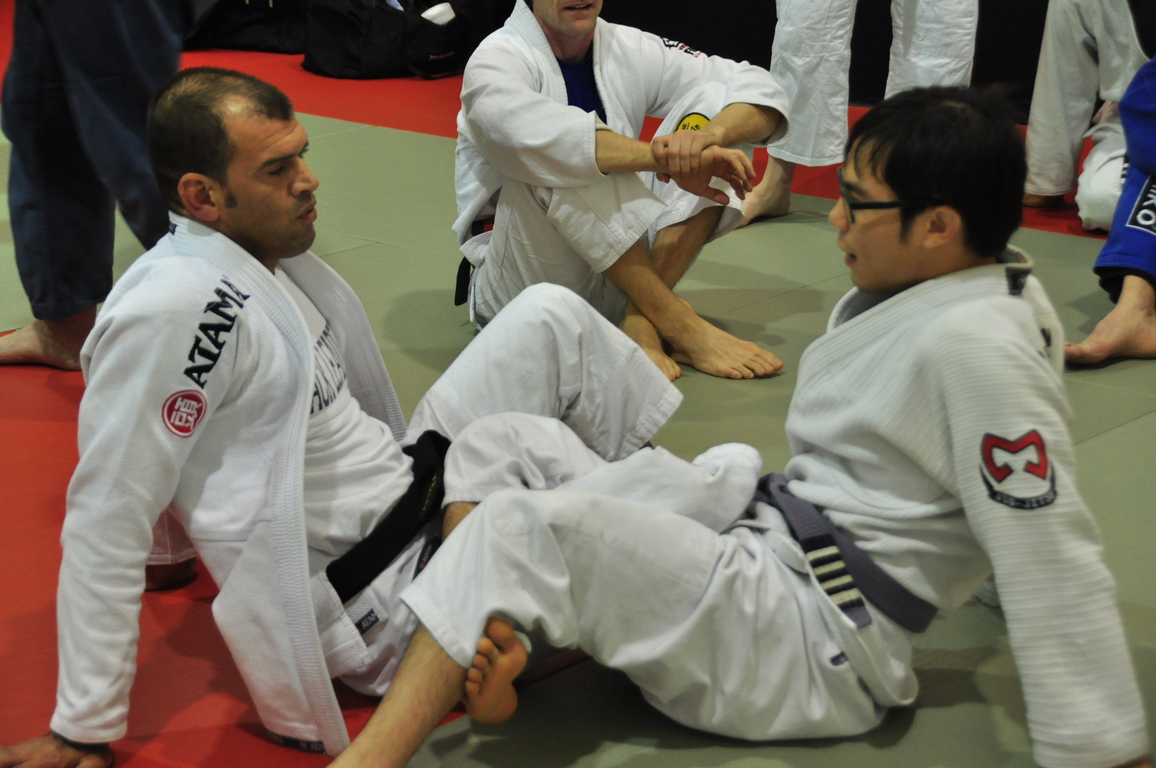
Megaton Dias demonstrating the 50-50 guard

The 50-50 (Fifty-fifty) guard is a position popularized by Roberto “Gordo” Correa and extensively used by the Mendes Brothers, Rafael and Guilherme Mendes, Bruno Frazzato, Ryan Hall and Ramon Lemos from the Atos Jiu-Jitsu Team. In other grappling systems such as catch wrestling and Sambo, it is a form of the "outside leg triangle" type of leg control. In this position, the fighter on the bottom crosses a triangle on the opponent's leg, which allows for the leg to be dominated while leaving the arms free to work on sweeps and submissions. This position has been heavily criticized for use in competitions with restricted use of leglocks due to the potential of stalling a match when the fighter on top cannot pass the guard and the fighter on the bottom cannot successfully perform a sweep.

== Passing the Guard ==
In order to overcome the primary defense of one's opponent, their guard, and attain a more dominant position, such as side mount, full mount, or knee on stomach a practitioner must pass the guard. There are several ways of doing so; many involve pain compliance whereby the practitioner persuades the opponent to release their guard through an abrasive action. Examples of this type of action would be digging the practitioner's forearms into the inner thigh of the opponent, standing and attempting a can opener neck crank, or in the case of a mixed martial arts setting, to simply strike the opponent until the guard is released. Passing the guard however has perils of its own, as it has a tendency to leave the practitioner particularly vulnerable to counterattack in the form of sweeps and submissions.

=== Simple guard pass ===
Simple guard pass also known as the arm/leg pull is a guard pass demonstrated in The Essence Of Judo by Kyuzo Mifune, and it is an unnamed technique described in The Canon Of Judo. In Brazilian Jiu Jitsu this pass is commonly referred to as the Toreando/Bull Fighter Pass. The main characteristic of the pass is the practitioner side-stepping around the opponent's legs whilst simultaneously pulling aside the opponent's leg or pinning the opponents legs to the ground.

=== Stacking guard pass ===
Stacking Guard Pass is also demonstrated in The Essence Of Judo by Mifune, and it is also an unnamed technique described in The Canon Of Judo. The main characteristic of the technique is the practitioner lifting the opponent and stacking them, into a possible neck crank or blood choke submission, when the practitioner is in the opponent's open guard.

=== Near knee guard pass ===
Near Knee Guard Pass is also demonstrated in The Essence Of Judo by Mifune as well as Canon of Judo by Mifune. In Brazilian Jiu Jitsu, this guard pass is commonly referred to as the Knee Over Pass. The main characteristic of this pass is the practitioner driving their knee over the opponent's same side thigh while in the opponent's open guard.

== See also ==
- Half guard
- Grappling
- Grappling hold
- Brazilian Jiu-jitsu
- Judo
