= Grappling =

Range of techniques used in many disciplines, styles and martial arts

Grapplers
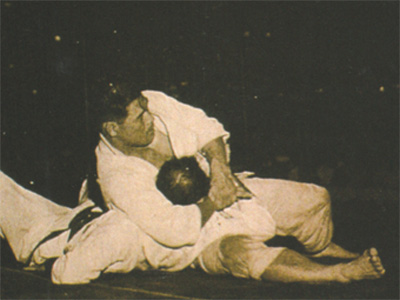
- Masahiko Kimura vs. Hélio Gracie, a high-profile 1951 bout between Masahiko Kimura and Hélio Gracie

Grappling is a fighting technique based on throws, trips, sweeps, clinch fighting, ground fighting and submission holds.

Grappling contests often involve takedowns and ground control, and may end when a contestant concedes defeat. Should there be no winner after the match time limit has lapsed, competition judges will determine the winner based on who exerted more control.

Grappling most commonly does not include striking or the use of weapons. However, some fighting styles or martial arts known especially for their grappling techniques teach tactics that include strikes and weapons either alongside grappling or combined with it.

== History ==
Grappling appears in the earliest combat systems, for wrestling is the oldest sport. With its foundational origins lie in prehistory, different wrestling styles independently emerged throughout the world in different eras of human history. In Mesopotamia and Ancient Egypt, depictions of wrestlers in grappling poses appear on tombs and artifacts dating back to 2000 BCE.

The Greeks formalized grappling in the sport of pále, a key part of the Olympic pentathlon, and developed a hybrid striking-grappling art called pankration. The Romans adopted and adapted these techniques into their own wrestling styles.

In India, kushti (traditional wrestling) dates back thousands of years. In East Asia, shuai jiao, jujutsu, and later judo (developed in the 1880s) emphasized leverage, throws and submissions.

During the Middle Ages, grappling was part of European knightly combat and included in manuals of historical European martial arts. It was used in both armored and unarmored fighting.

Grappling evolved into competitive sports, such as freestyle wrestling, Greco-Roman wrestling, and Brazilian Jiu-Jitsu. Today, grappling is a core skill in mixed martial arts and law enforcement training.

== Types of technique ==
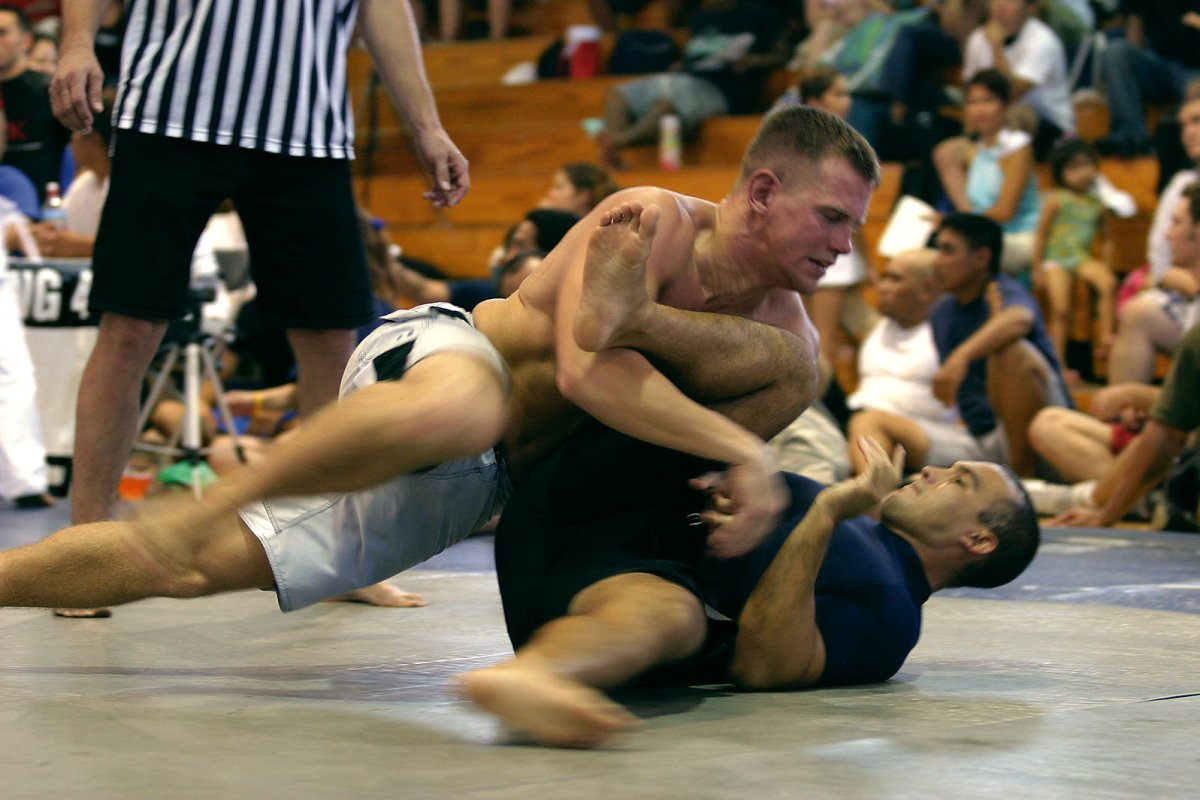
Hawaiian State Grappling Championships, August 2004.

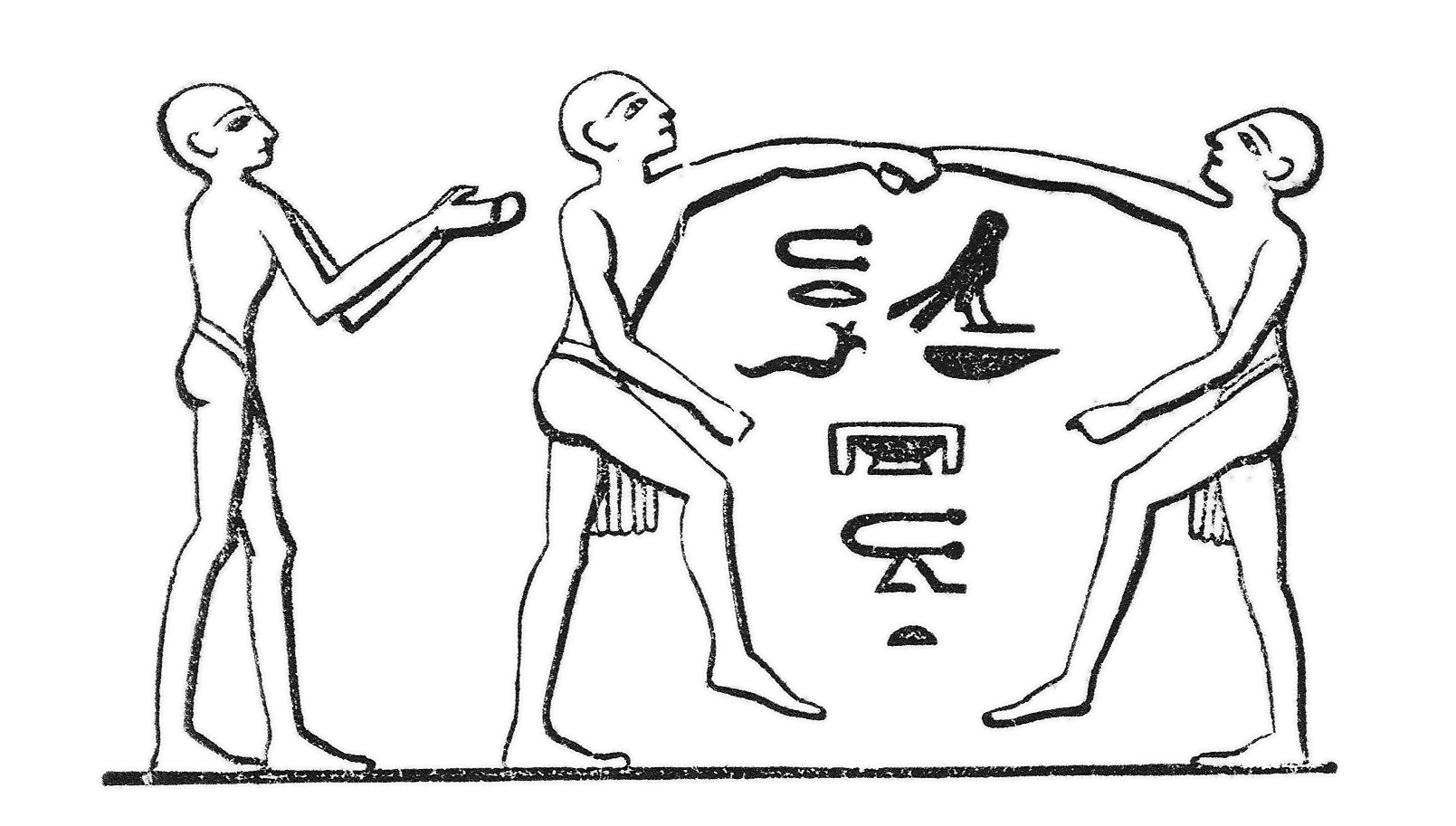
Ancient Egyptian wrestling

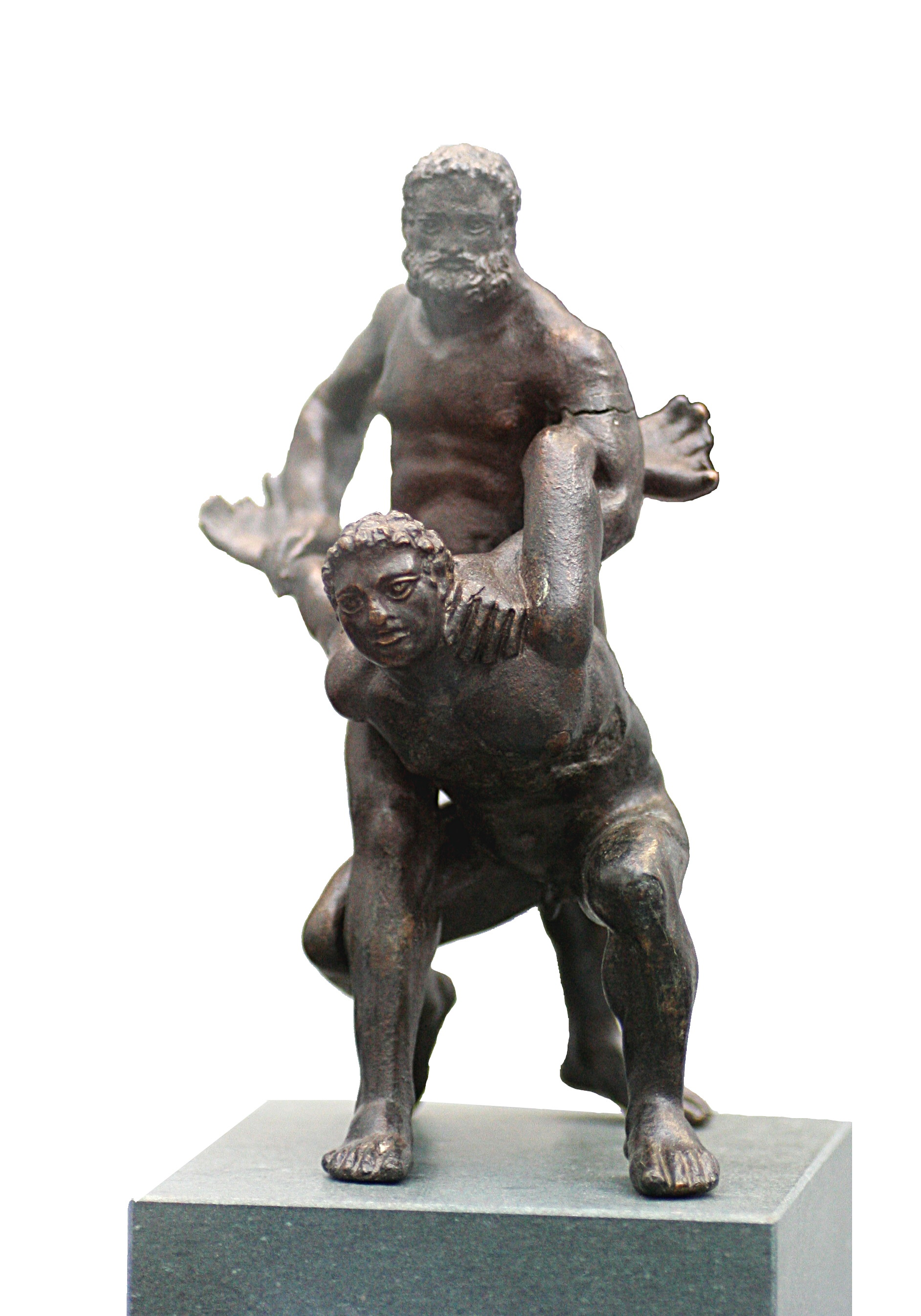
A Greek bronze statue from 2nd century BC depicting Pankration. The standing fighter is applying an armlock, a grappling technique. From the Staatliche Antikensammlungen in Munich.

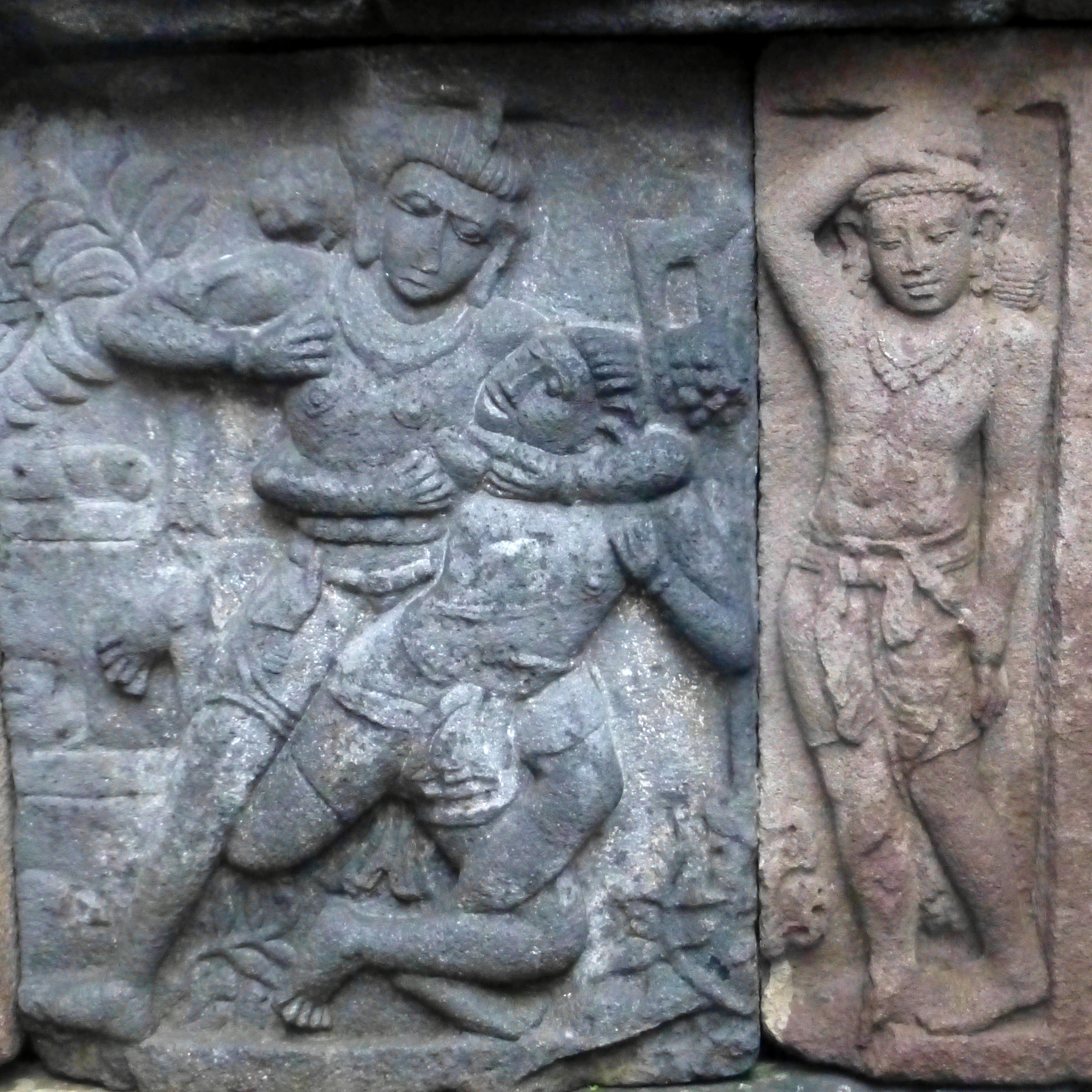
Bas-relief of grappling and locking techniques at Prambanan (9th century) in Indonesia

Grappling techniques can be broadly subdivided into clinch fighting; takedowns and throws; submission holds and pinning or controlling techniques; and sweeps, reversals, turnovers, and escapes.

- Clinching: or clinch work, takes place with both competitors on their feet using various clinch holds applied to the upper body of the opponent. Clinch work is generally used to set up or defend against throws or takedowns.
- Takedowns : A takedown is used by one grappler to manipulate their opponent from a standing position to a position on the ground. The grappler completing the takedown aims to end in a dominant position.
- Throws: A throw is a technique in which one grappler lifts or off-balances their opponent and maneuvers them forcefully through the air or to the ground. The purpose of throws varies among the different disciplines of grappling with some emphasizing throws with the potential to incapacitate the opponent, while leaving the thrower standing, or to gain a takedown or controlling position.
- Sprawling : A sprawl is a defensive technique usually used when the opponent attempts a takedown. It is performed by shifting the legs backwards and spread out in one fast motion. If done correctly one will land on their opponent's back and gain control.
- Submission holds: There are generally two types of submission holds: those that would potentially strangle or suffocate an opponent (chokes), and those that would potentially cause injury to a joint or other body part (locks). In sport grappling, a competitor is expected to submit, either verbally or by tapping the opponent, to admit defeat when they are caught in a submission hold they cannot escape. Competitors who refuse to "tap out" risk unconsciousness or serious injury.
- Securing or controlling techniques: A pin involves holding an opponent on their back in a position where they are unable to attack. In some styles of competitive grappling a pin is an instant victory, and in other styles it is considered a dominant position that is awarded with points. Other controlling techniques are used to hold an opponent face down on the ground or on all fours in order to prevent an escape or attack. Either of these types of technique may also be used as a prelude to a submission hold.
- Escapes: In a general sense, an escape is accomplished by maneuvering out of danger or from an inferior position; for example when a grappler who is underneath side control moves to guard or gets back to a neutral standing position, or when a grappler is able to maneuver out of a submission attempt and back to a position where they are no longer in immediate danger of being submitted.
- Turnovers: used to maneuver an opponent who is on all fours or flat on their stomach to their back, in order to score points, prepare for a pin or in order to gain a more dominant position.
- Reversals or sweeps: These occur when a grappler who was underneath their opponent on the ground is able to maneuver so that they gain a top position over their opponent.

== Use ==
The degree to which grappling is utilized in different fighting systems varies. Some systems, such as amateur wrestling, pehlwani, judo and Brazilian jiu-jitsu are exclusively grappling arts and do not allow striking. Some other grappling arts allow some limited forms of striking, for example in sumo and in combat jiu jitsu it is possible to strike with open hands (slapping). Many combat sports, such as shooto and mixed martial arts competitions, use both grappling and striking extensively as part of the sport. Grappling is not allowed in some martial arts and combat sports, usually for the sake of focusing on other aspects of combat such as punching, kicking or mêlée weapons. Opponents in these types of matches, however, still grapple with each other occasionally when fatigued or in pain; when either occurs, the referee will step in and restart the match, sometimes giving a warning to one or both of the fighters. Examples of these include boxing, kickboxing, taekwondo, karate, and fencing. While prolonged grappling in Muay Thai will result in a separation of the competitors, the art extensively uses the clinch hold known as a double collar tie.

Grappling techniques and defenses to grappling techniques are also considered important in self-defense applications and in law enforcement. The most common grappling techniques taught for self-defense are escapes from holds and application of pain compliance techniques.

Grappling can be trained for self-defense, sport, and mixed martial arts (MMA) competition.

== Stand-up grappling ==
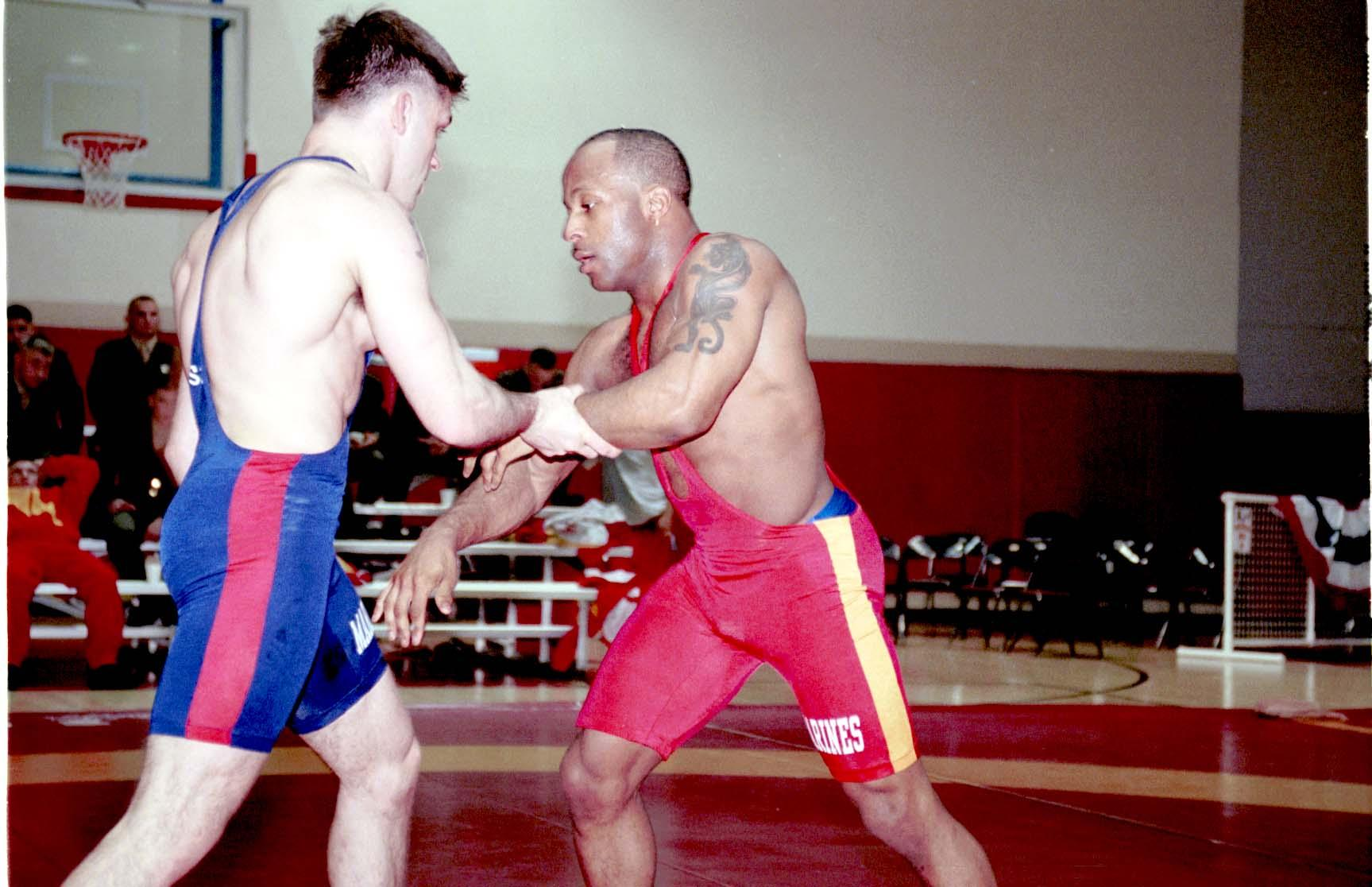
Two wrestlers engaging.

Stand-up grappling is arguably an integral part of all grappling and clinch fighting arts, considering that two combatants generally start fighting from a stand-up position. The aim of stand-up grappling varies according to the martial arts or combat sports in question. Defensive stand-up grappling concerns itself with pain-compliance holds and escapes from possible grappling holds applied by an opponent, while offensive grappling techniques include submission holds, trapping, takedowns and throws, all of which can be used to inflict serious damage, or to move the fight to the ground. Stand-up grappling can also be used both offensively and defensively simultaneously with striking, either to trap an opponent's arms while striking, prevent the opponent from obtaining sufficient distance to strike effectively, or to bring the opponent close to apply, for instance, knee strikes.

In combat sports, stand-up grappling usually revolves around successful takedowns and throws. Grappling is a major part of combat glima and Løse-tak sport glima, and the fight continues on the ground if both combatants end up there. In other martial sports such as MMA, the fight may continue on the ground.

== Ground grappling ==
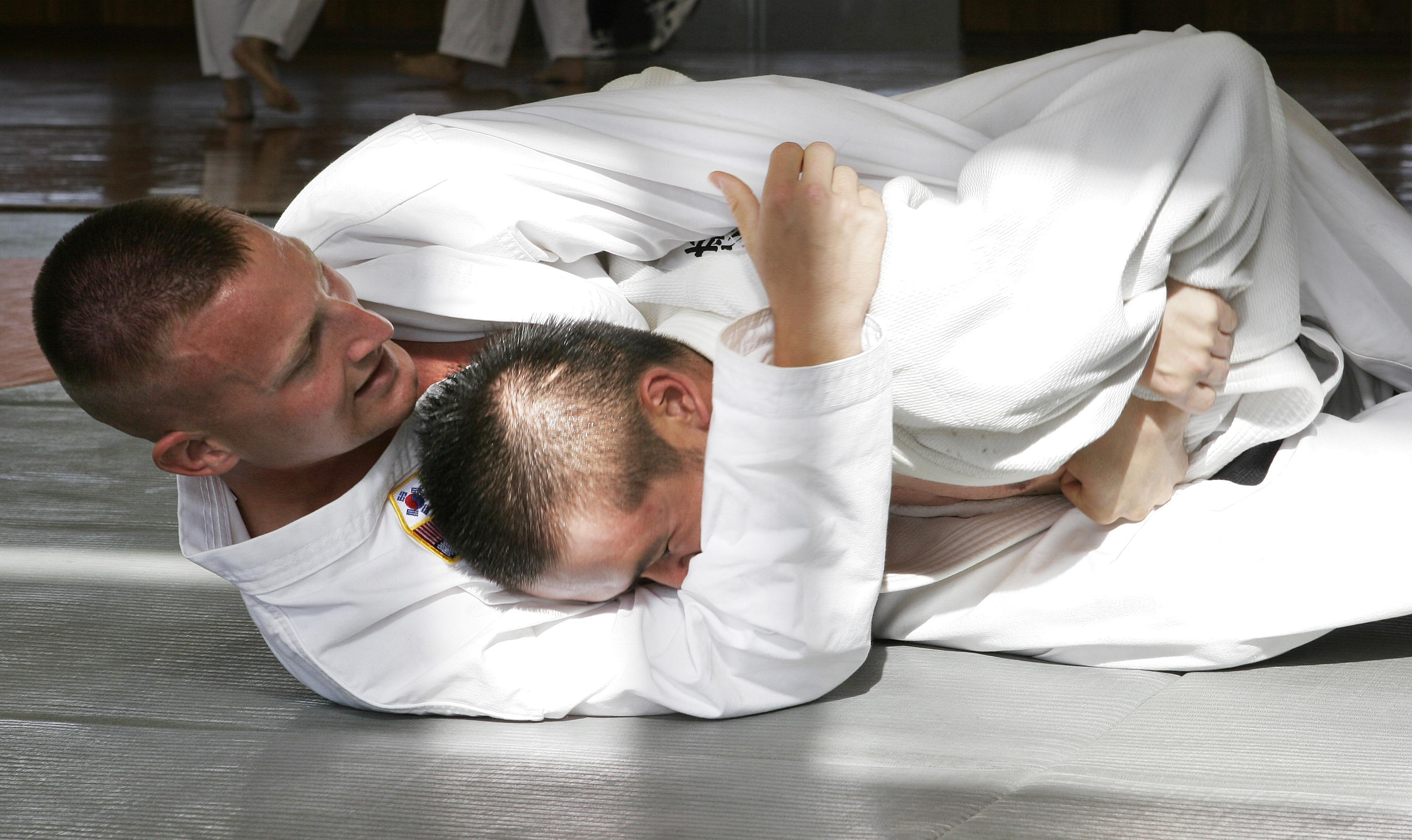
In judo, the aim of ground techniques (ne-waza) is to obtain a chokehold, joint lock or to pin the opponent.

Ground grappling refers to all the grappling techniques that are applied while the grapplers are no longer in a standing position. A large part of most martial arts and combat sports which feature ground grappling is positioning and obtaining a dominant position. A dominant position (usually on top) allows the dominant grappler a variety of options, including: attempting to escape by standing up, obtaining a pin or hold-down to control and exhaust the opponent, executing a submission hold, or striking the opponent. The bottom grappler is, on the other hand, concerned with escaping the situation and improving their position, typically by using a sweep or reversal. In some disciplines, especially those where the guard is used, the bottom grappler may also be able to finish the fight from the bottom by a submission hold. Some people feel more confident on the bottom because of the large number of submissions that can be accomplished from having the opponent in full-guard.

== Applications ==
When unskilled fighters get embroiled in combat, a common reaction is to grab the opponent in an attempt to slow the situation down by holding them still, resulting in an unsystematic struggle that relies on brute force. A skilled fighter, in contrast, can perform takedowns as a way of progressing to a superior position such as a Mount (grappling) or side control, or using clinch holds and ground positions to set up strikes, choke holds, and joint locks. A grappler who has been taken down to the ground can use defensive positions such as the Guard (grappling), which protects against being mounted or attacked. If a grappler is strong and can utilize leverage well, a takedown or throw itself can be a fight-ending maneuver; the impact can render an opponent unconscious. On the other hand, grappling also offers the possibility of controlling an opponent without injuring them. For this reason, most police staff receive some training in grappling. Likewise, grappling sports have been devised so that their participants can compete using full physical effort without injuring their opponents.

Grappling is called dumog in Eskrima. The term chin na in Chinese martial arts deals with the use of grappling to achieve submission or incapacitation of the opponent (these may involve the use of acupressure points). Some Chinese martial arts, aikido, some eskrima systems, the Viking martial art of glima, as well as medieval and Renaissance European martial arts, practice grappling while one or both participants is armed. Their practice is significantly more dangerous than unarmed grappling and generally requires a great deal of training.

== Types of grappling ==
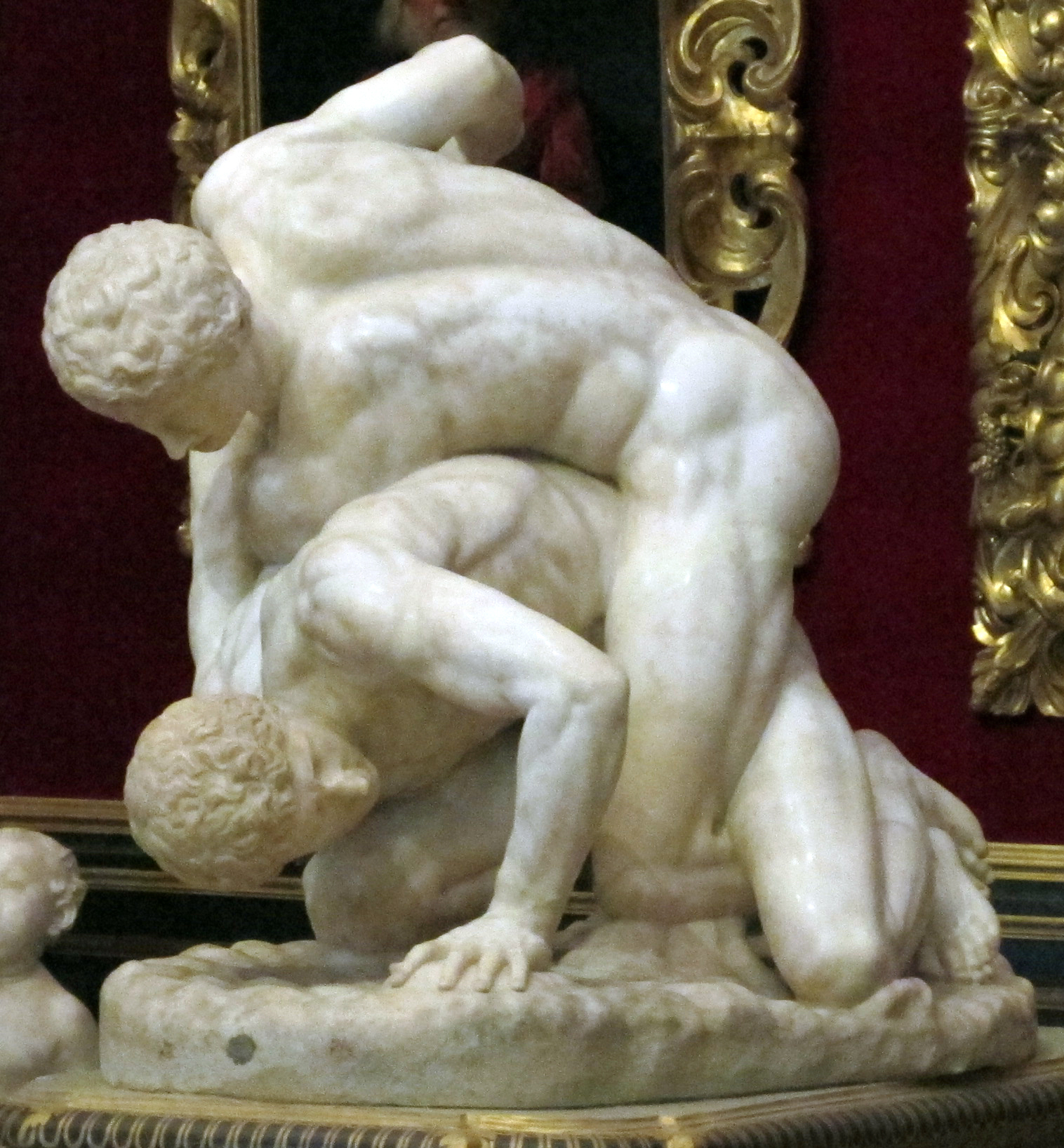
A Roman statue portraying grapplers.

There are many different regional styles of grappling around the world that are practiced within a limited geographic area or country. Several martial arts and fighting disciplines employ grappling techniques, such as judo, Brazilian jiu-jitsu, Cornish wrestling, catch wrestling, shoot wrestling, other styles of submission wrestling, sambo, hapkido and several types of wrestling including freestyle and Greco-Roman have gained global popularity. Judo, Freestyle Wrestling, and Greco-Roman Wrestling are Olympic Sports while Grappling, Brazilian Jiu-jitsu and Sambo have their own World Championship Competitions. Other known grappling-oriented systems are sumo, shuai jiao, malla-yuddha and aikido.

In these arts, the object is either to take down and pin the opponent, or to catch the adversary in a specialized chokehold or joint lock which forces them to submit and admit defeat or be rendered helpless (unconscious or broken limbs). There are two forms of dress for grappling that dictate pace and style of action: with a jacket, such as a gi or kurtka, and without (No-Gi). The jacket, or "gi", form most often utilizes grips on the cloth to control the opponent's body, while the "no-gi" form emphasizes body control of the torso and head using only the natural holds provided by the body. The use of a jacket is compulsory in judo competition, sambo competition, and most Brazilian jiu-jitsu competition, as well as a variety of folk wrestling styles around the world. Jackets are not used in many forms of wrestling, such as Olympic Freestyle, Greco-Roman wrestling and Grappling.

Grappling techniques are also used in mixed martial arts along with striking techniques. Strikes can be used to set up grappling techniques and vice versa.

=== ADCC ===
The ADCC Submission Fighting World Championship is the most prestigious submission grappling tournament in the world and is held biannually. It's often praised for its ruleset which encourages engagements and submissions along with often being a "litmus test" for upcoming grapplers.

=== Mundials ===
The World Jiu-Jitsu Championship, also commonly called the Mundials (Portuguese for "Worlds"), is the most prestigious jacketed full range (takedown, position, and submission inclusive) grappling tournament in the world. The event also hosts a non-jacketed division (no gi), but that sub-event is not as prestigious as ADCC in terms of pure non-jacketed competition.

=== United World Wrestling ===
United World Wrestling (UWW) is the international governing body for the sport of wrestling. It presides over international competitions for various forms of wrestling, including Grappling for men and women. The flagship Grappling's event of UWW is the Grappling World Championships. See more FILA grappling

=== NAGA ===
The North American Grappling Association (NAGA) is an organization started in 1995 that holds submission grappling and Brazilian Jiu-Jitsu tournaments throughout North America and Europe. NAGA is the largest submission grappling association in the world with over 175,000 participants worldwide, including some of the top submission grapplers and MMA fighters in the world. NAGA grappling tournaments consist of gi and no-gi divisions. No-Gi competitors compete under rules drafted by NAGA. Gi competitors compete under standardized Brazilian Jiu-Jitsu rules. Notable Champions Frank Mir, Joe Fiorentino, Jon Jones, Khabib Nurmagomedov, Anthony Porcelli and Antonio Bustorff.

=== GRiND ===
GRiND is the first Indian Pro Grappling tournament series started in May 2017 conducting grappling championships (position and submission included). There is a first time no "Gi" event series in India.

=== IGF ===
International Grappling Federation.

== See also ==
- Clinch fighting
- Combatives
- Grappling hold
- Grappling position
- Ground fighting
- Submission wrestling
- Arm wrestling
- Brazilian Jiu Jitsu
- Judo
- Luta Livre
- Wrestling

== Other sources ==
- Gracie; Renzo, Gracie, Royler; Peligro, Kid; Danaher, John (2001). Brazilian Jiu-Jitsu: Theory and technique. Invisible Cities Press. ISBN 1-931229-08-2.
- Ohlenkamp, Neil (2006) Judo Unleashed basic reference on judo. ISBN 0-07-147534-6.
