= Arm triangle choke =

Head and arm chokehold

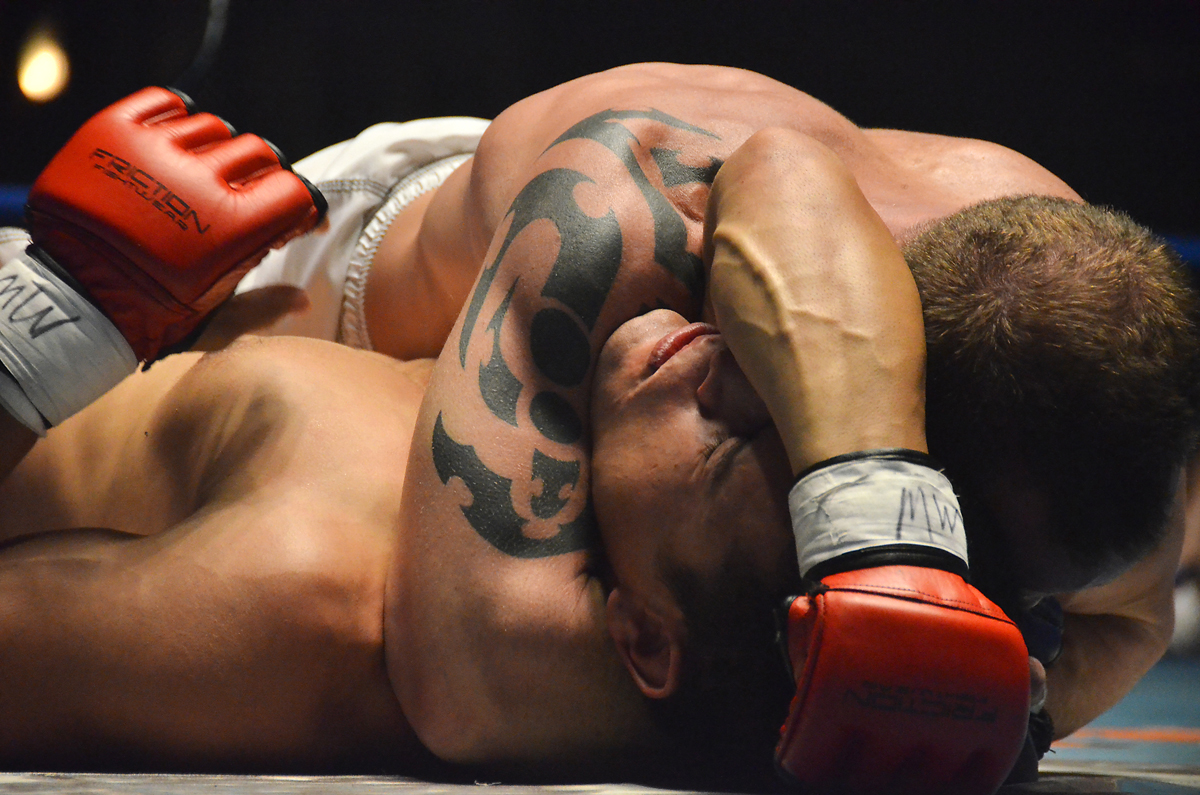
- Arm triangle choke from the mount position
- Classification: Chokehold
- Style: Judo, Brazilian Jiu-jitsu, Catch Wrestling
- AKA: Arm triangle

Arm triangle choke, side choke, or head and arm choke are generic terms describing blood chokeholds in which the opponent is strangled in between their own shoulder and the practitioner's arm. This is as opposed to the regular triangle choke, which denotes a chokehold using the legs, albeit with a similar mechanism of strangulation against the opponent's own shoulder. An arm triangle choke where the practitioner is on the side of the opponent and presses a forearm into the opposite side of the neck of the opponent is known as a side choke, such as from the kata-gatame hold. The time it takes for the opponent to be rendered unconscious does vary depending on the configuration of the grip and position, although the standard arm triangle is one of the fastest at 7.2 seconds.

== Mounted arm triangle ==
A Mounted arm triangle is an arm triangle from the mount position. The top player scoops the head of the bottom player and raises the bottom player's arm above their head to connect the neck and the shoulder. In this position, shoulder of the bottom player along with the bicep/forearm of the top player cut off both carotid arteries. The top player then applies pressure by locking their grip on the side of the raised shoulder and squeezing their arms together while applying even more pressure on the side of the shoulder with their head and neck. In the case where this is not enough pressure to force the bottom player to tap, the top player then dismounts and circles outward in a corkscrew motion while settling their hips to multiply the choking force. This is one of the lowest-risk, highest-reward submissions that can put an opponent to sleep within a matter of seconds when applied correctly.

== Anaconda choke ==
An anaconda choke is an arm triangle from the front headlock position. The performer threads their arm under the opponent's neck and through the armpit, and grasps the biceps of the opposing arm. The performer then attempts to pin the opponent onto the trapped shoulder so as to better interrupt the flow of blood, all the while applying pressure with the grasped biceps. The performer may accomplish this by rolling the opponent over the trapped shoulder, (known as a gator roll) and use the momentum to turn the opponent onto their trapped shoulder. The creator of this choke is unknown, although many sources point towards UFC veteran Milton Vieira. Viera himself has disputed this however and has gone on record as not claiming to be the originator of the Anaconda Choke, explaining that it is likely that multiple people came up with the same choke simultaneously.

== D'Arce choke/Brabo choke ==
The D'Arce choke and Brabo choke use similar techniques except the Brabo choke is used in gi BJJ by gripping your opponent's gi, in contrast to the D'Arce choke which does not. The D'Arce choke, or Brabo choke, is similar to the Anaconda choke. The difference is that the choking arm is threaded under the near arm, in front of the opponent's neck, and on top of the far arm.

The D'Arce choke gets its name from Joe D'Arce, a third-degree Brazilian Jiu-Jitsu black belt under Renzo Gracie. D'Arce is not the inventor of the choke however, he merely popularized its use in competition. Instead the Luta Livre practitioners point to its originator being Björn Dag Lagerström who discovered the choke when attempting to perform an Anaconda Choke in practice, and getting his arms the wrong way around. During a sparring session between D'Arce and Jason Miller, the choke surprised Miller, who gave it the name and pronunciation "Darce" rather than the proper "D-Arsee," when D'Arce did not have a title for the technique.

The Brabo choke gets its name from Leonardo Vieira, founder of the Checkmat academy. Vieira first saw one of his white belt students get into a similar position by instinct and he started working on this position. He used this position to submit most of his opponents at the 2004 Pan American Championship and at the World Cup of 2004. Vieira's friend, Kid Pelligro, calling this position "Brabo choke" deriving from Vieira's email address "leobrabo@...." which fit the actual meaning of the word "brabo" in Portuguese of angry, aggressive or toughness.
