= Sweep (martial arts) =

Martial arts techniques

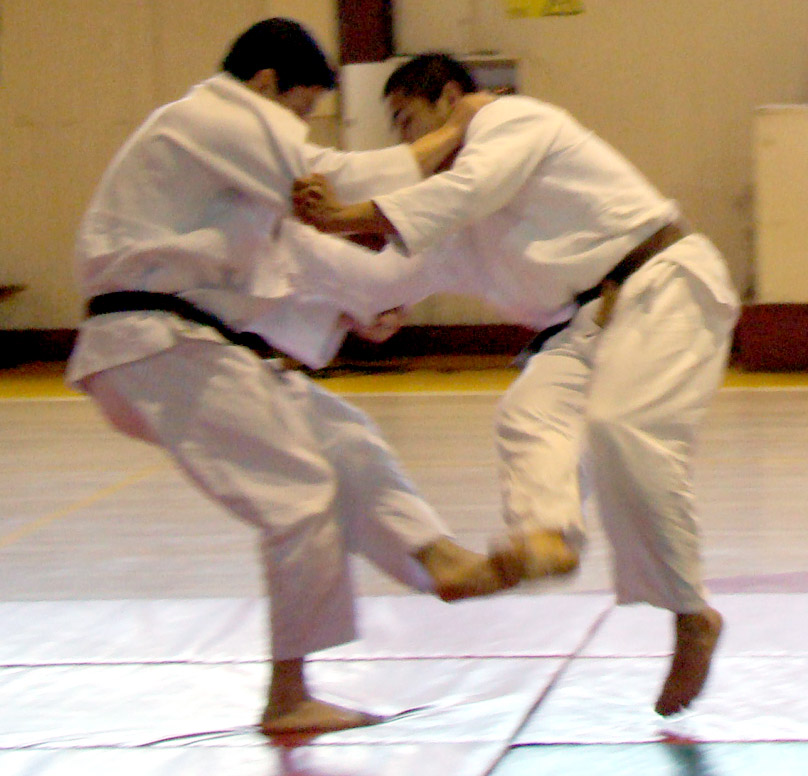
- Using one's leg to sweep an opponent is an important element of many martial arts throws, such as this foot sweep (deashi harai).

Japanese name
- Kanji: 足払い
- Hiragana: あしばらい
Transcriptions
- Revised Hepburn: ashi-barai
- Kunrei-shiki: asi-barai

A sweep is either of two categories of martial arts techniques. From standing, sweeps are throws or takedowns that primarily use the legs to attack an opponent's legs. On the ground, sweeps are techniques for reversing a grappling position from a guard position.

== Standing ==
When standing it is a technique used to take an opponent to the ground by knocking their legs out from under them, so is classed as a throw or takedown. The force of the sweep either runs perpendicular to the opponent's leg or rises as it strikes the leg, lifting the foot from the ground. A sweep can be used to take the opponent to the ground or it can simply disrupt the opponent's balance long enough to make an opening for a punch or kick. In Japanese it is known as ashi-barai.

=== Illustration in kick boxing ===
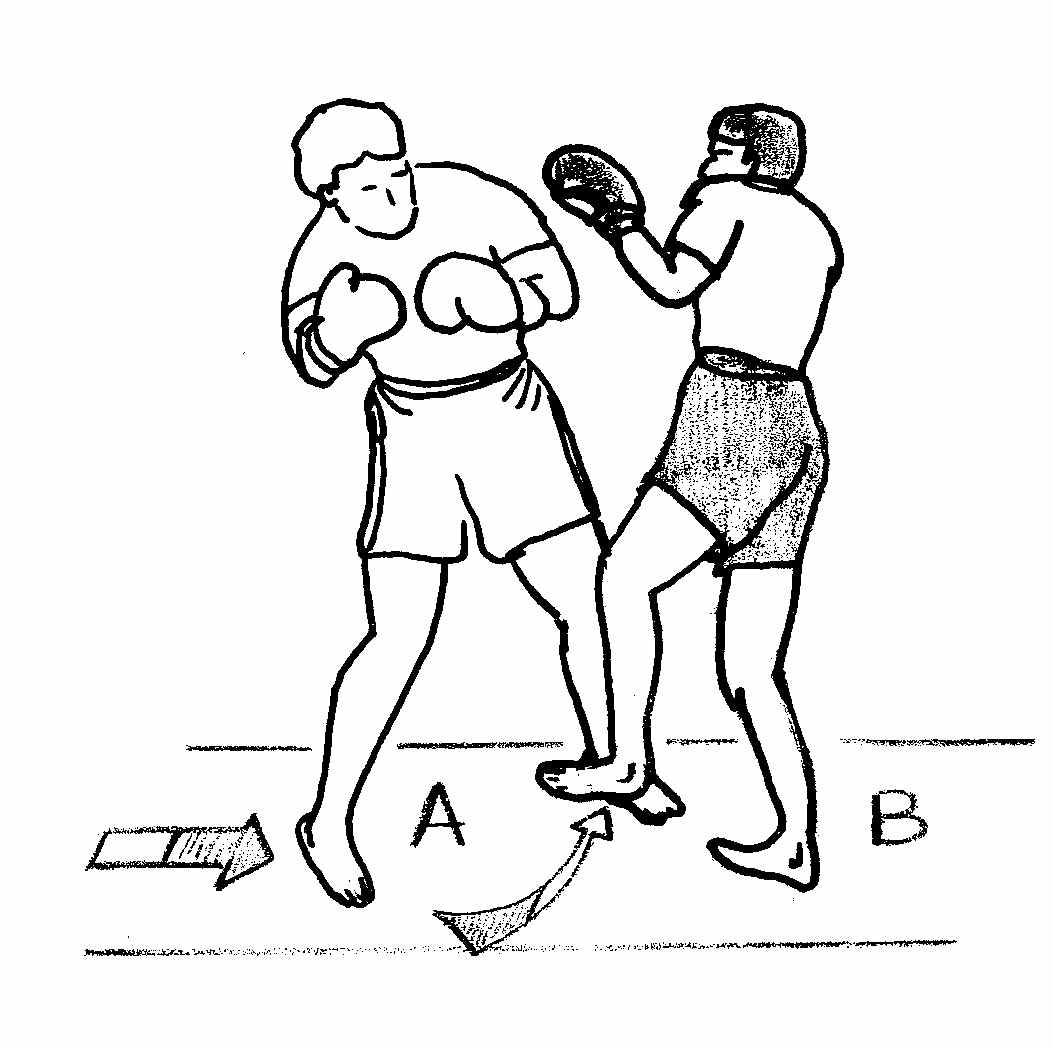
'Spoon-type' Sweep

Using a hook kick

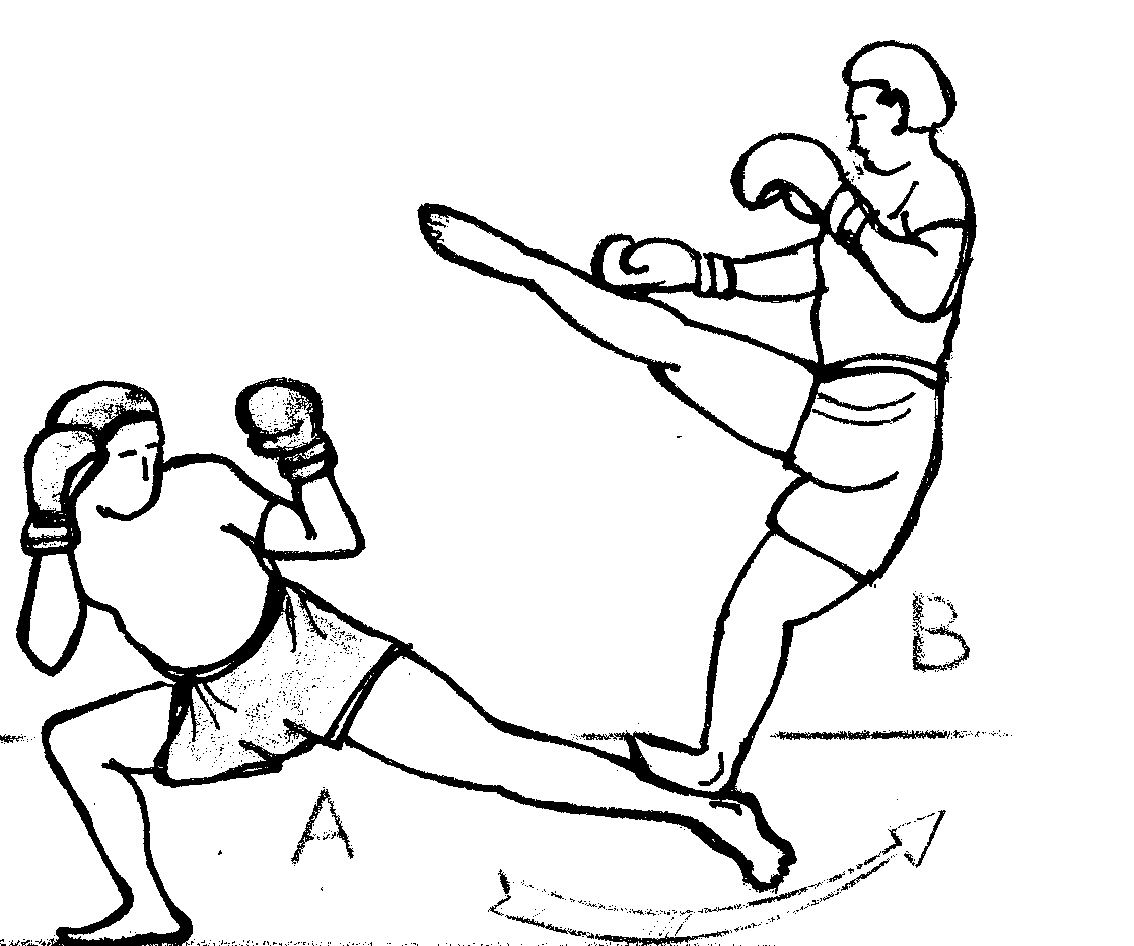
Using a spinning kick

== Ground work ==
Push sweep demonstration

A sweep, when referred to in the context of ground fighting, is a technique used to transition from a neutral or inferior position to a dominant position, such as a practitioner moving from in an opponent's guard to full mount, hence the alternative term 'reversal' as the dominance of positions have been reversed.

=== Push sweep ===
A push sweep is one of the guard sweeps described in Brazilian Jiu-Jitsu. The main characteristic of the push sweep is the practitioner pushing the opponent's knee out from under them with their foot, when the practitioner has the opponent in their open guard. The push sweep is similar to the scissor sweep, which uses a scissor motion of the legs to sweep the opponent, but adds the detail of pushing the opponent's knee out from under them. This additional detail is required when the opponent keeps a wide base to prevent the scissor sweep.

== See also ==
- Foot sweep
- Rasteira, sweep in capoeira
