= Transition (grappling) =

Move from one grappling hold or grappling position to another

- Style: Wrestling

A transition in grappling is a move from one grappling hold or grappling position to another. The process is called transitioning and is one of the most important aspects of ground grappling, as it allows the combatant performing the transition to advance in positioning, for instance by using a sweep, or to attempt pinning holds or submission holds.

In judo, the term is also used to refer to the skillful transition between standing phase and the ground phase.
