= Overhook =

Clinch hold in wrestling

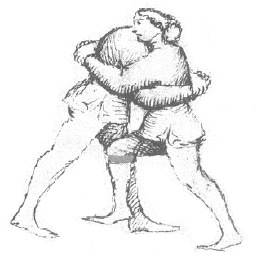
- In this clinch, the wrestler on the right has an overhook, that on the left an underhook.
- Classification: Clinch hold
- Style: Wrestling
- AKA: Whizzer

In wrestling, an overhook is a clinch hold that is used to control the opponent. It is sometimes incorrectly called a wizard, which is a malapropism of whizzer (when the opponent's armpit and shoulder are lifted with an overhook hold, usually done against leg takedown attacks). An overhook is performed from any direction by putting an arm over the opponent's arm, and encircling the opponent's arm or upper body. Having an overhook with one arm is called a single overhook, while having overhooks with both arms is known as double overhooks. Overhooks are typically employed in response to underhooks by an opponent.

Illustration of single overhook

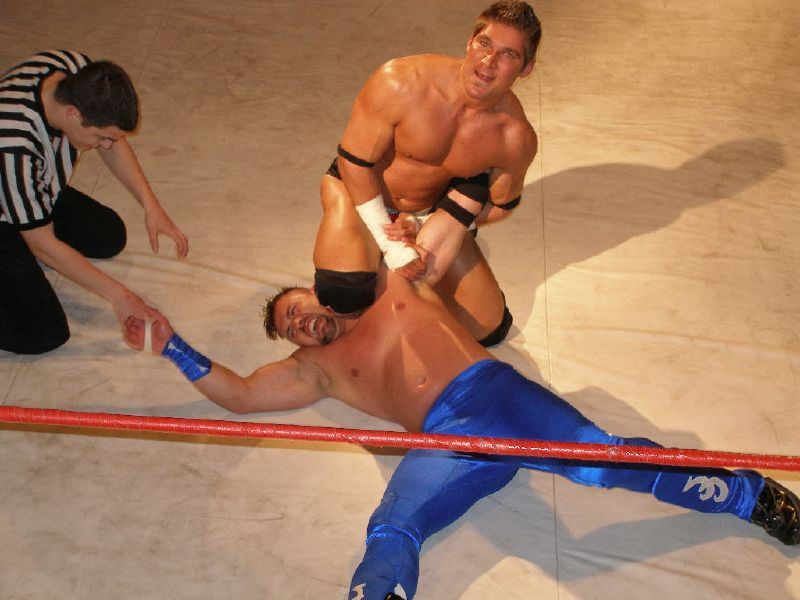
Wrestler Antonio Thomas applying a single overhook

== Single overhook ==
A single overhook can be used to take an opponent down. The protagonist hooks over one arm of the opponent, simultaneously moving to that side of the opponent, often while holding the opponent's other upper arm or elbow with his other hand. He puts his weight on the opponent's hooked arm, forcing him to the ground, and then steps over the opponent's back.

== Double overhooks ==
The double overhooks are generally considered inferior to double underhooks, and are often used in response to double underhooks by the opponent. If the opponent's hands can be locked to the opponent's body it is possible to advance into a bear hug, with the opponent's arms pinned. Most commonly however, the overhooks are used to prevent the opponent from advancing into a bear hug, by locking the double overhooks around the opponent's double underhooks.

== See also ==
- Bear hug
- Collar-and-elbow position
- Collar tie
- Pinch grip tie
- Over-under position
- Underhook
