= Over–under position =

Stand-up grappling position in mixed martial arts

Over–under
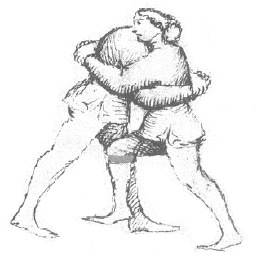
- Classification: Clinch hold
- Style: Wrestling

Over–under is a stand-up grappling position in which both combatants have one overhook and one underhook, and is the most common stand-up grappling position in mixed martial arts. The head is typically on the same side as the overhooked arm, to allow greater weight to be put on the opponent's underhooked arm, and hence preventing the opponent from using the underhooked arm effectively. The over–under position can be advanced into a pinch grip tie by locking the hands behind the opponent's back.

== See also ==
- Bear hug
- Collar-and-elbow position
- Double collar tie
- Double underhooks
- Pinch grip tie
