= Collar-and-elbow position =

Grappling position

Collar-and-elbow
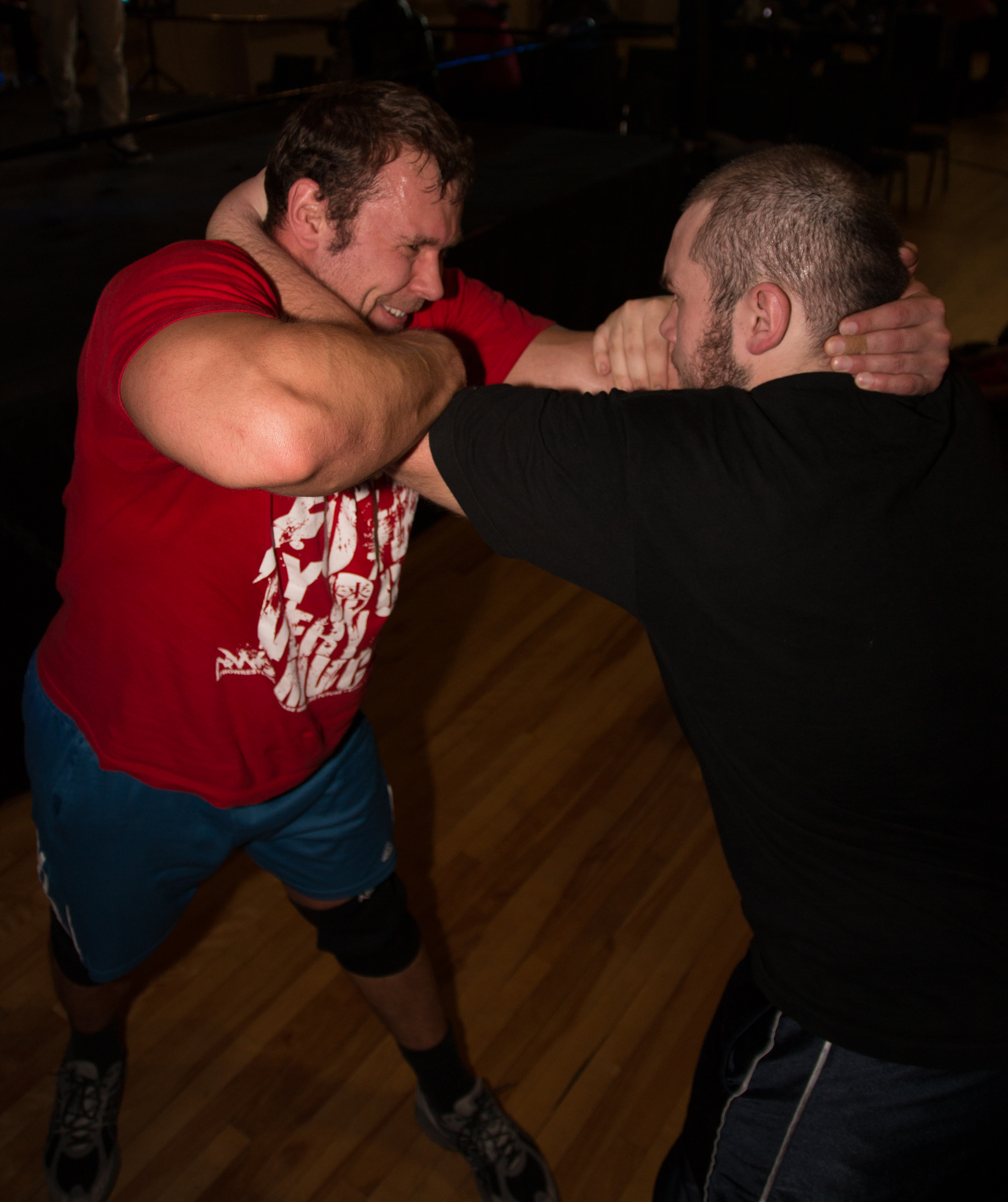
- Collar and elbow hold, as demonstrated by Maybach Beta (left, in red) and Holden Albright
- Classification: Clinch hold
- Style: Wrestling

A collar-and-elbow hold is a stand-up grappling position where both combatants have a collar tie, and hold the opponent's other arm at the elbow. Generally the opening move in professional wrestling, the collar-and-elbow is generally a neutral position, but by pushing the hand on the elbow to the inside of the opponent's arms, and holding the biceps, more control can be obtained. From here it will be easier to strike or to attempt takedowns, while defending against the opponent's techniques.

== See also ==
- Bear hug
- Double collar tie
- Double underhooks
- Pinch grip tie
- Over-under position
