= Knee (strike) =

Strike with the knee

Front knee strike

A knee strike (commonly referred to simply as a knee) is a strike with the knee, either with the kneecap or the surrounding area. Kneeing is a disallowed practice in many combat sports, especially to the head of a downed opponent. Styles such as kickboxing and several mixed martial arts organizations allow kneeing depending on the positioning of the fighters. Knee strikes are native to the traditional Southeast Asian martial arts and traditional Okinawan martial arts.

== Straight ==
The straight knee (also known as a front knee) is a typical knee strike, and involves thrusting the front of the knee into the head or body of an opponent. The straight knee can be applied from a stand-up position both when the combatants are separated, or when they are clinching. A particularly effective clinching position for throwing front knee is the double collar tie, where the head of the opponent is controlled. On the ground, front knees can be effective from a few top positions such as the Side control and north-south position. Typical targets for the front knee include the head, hips, ribs, solar plexus, stomach and thighs. In Muay Thai, a double collar tie with a front knee to the face was traditionally called Hak Kor Aiyara. The groin is widely considered the key target for knee strikes and clinch knee attacks in a street fight according to karate, tae kwon do, muay thai, and many other martial arts.

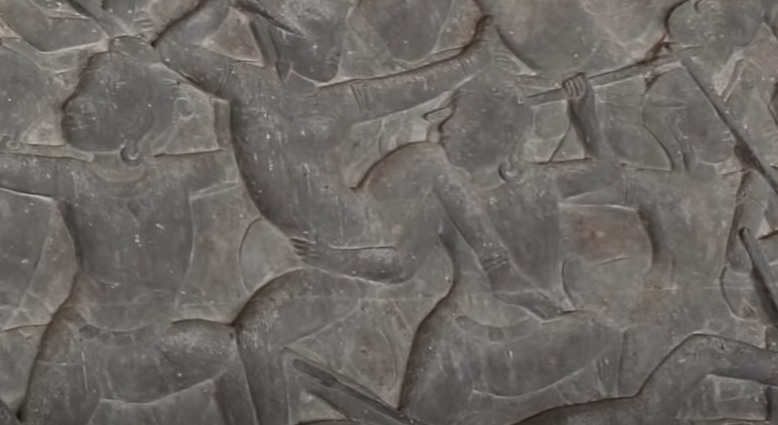
900 year old stone carving of knee attack to the head. Located at Angkor Wat(1100s) in Cambodia.

== Curved ==
The curved knee (also sometimes called a side knee or roundhouse knee) is similar to the front knee except that it does not use a forward thrusting motion, but is instead rotated from the outside. Whereas the front knee needs some space in between the combatants to be performed, the curved knee can be executed from a minimal distance, such as in a close clinch. This technique is often employed when an opponent is attempting to protect from a straight knee. Typical targets include floating ribs, hips, and the side of the abdomen.

== Flying ==
A flying knee (known as hanuman thayarn in Muay Thai, and sometimes called a jumping knee) is a knee strike very similar to a front knee, except that it is performed in stand-up fighting by jumping, and often by rushing towards the opponent. A more reckless application of the flying knee strike can be applied by rotating the body so that the side of the knee strikes the opponent, used more as an offensive pushing attack rather than a concussive KO attack. Generally, flying knee strikes can be effectively applied when the opponent is off-balanced, recovering from previous strikes, or as a counter to a strike by the opponent. It can also be used as a follow-up maneuver after delivering a particularly incapacitating strike. One example took place at a UFC event, where Jorge Masvidal knocked Ben Askren unconscious in 5 seconds with a flying knee when Askren shot in for a takedown. A famous flying knee strike in pop culture is the "Knee of Justice" used by Captain Falcon in the Super Smash Bros. series.

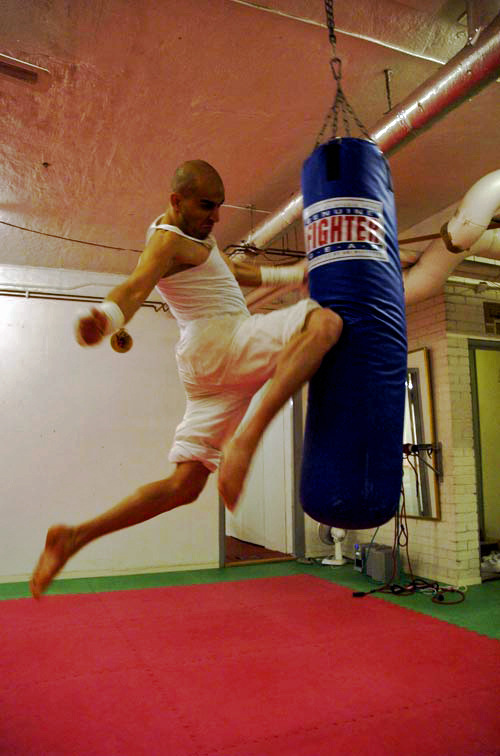
Fighter performing a flying knee strike.

Jumping clinch knee strike in Kun Khmer

=== Use in combat sports ===
Provided that it makes impact with the head, a flying knee offers substantial momentum and knockout power. This spectacular strike is a crowd-pleaser in fighting sports such as K-1 (kickboxing) and MMA. In one UFC bout, James Irvin knocked out Terry Martin with a flying knee; Martin was unresponsive for three minutes and left on a stretcher. At K-1 Hero's 5, Norifumi Yamamoto knocked out Kazuyuki Miyata with a flying knee at four seconds into the first round. 3 time K-1 champion Remy Bonjasky is known for his flying knees. Japanese professional wrestling, in keeping with its martial arts roots, has many wrestlers utilizing knees in matches. Tomomi Tsuruta used a jumping knee as one of his signature moves, inspired by kickboxer Tadashi Sawamura. Takashi Sugiura and Jun Akiyama are known for their effective knee strikes. José Aldo landed a double flying knee at WEC 41 against Cub Swanson, in one of his first international MMA fights, scoring a knockout win just eight seconds into the first round of the fight.

== Use in Professional Wrestling ==
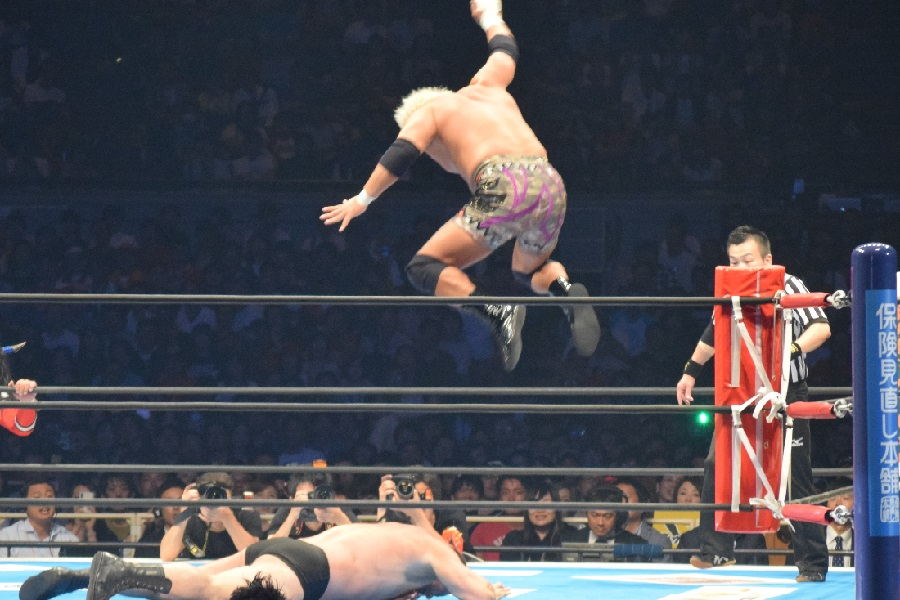
Knee Drop

The hizageri translates to "knee kick" and used to describe knee strikes in professional wrestling and Japanese martial arts. Famous knee strikes in professional wrestling include the kitchen sink, bicycle knee, GTS, the running knee, bomaye and kamigoye.

== Record ==
The world record for most knee strikes on one leg in a minute is 143 knee strikes by Pakistani athlete Haram Rehan.

== See also ==
- Kick
- Clinch fighting
