= Clinch fighting =

Grappling position in boxing or wrestling, a stand-up embrace

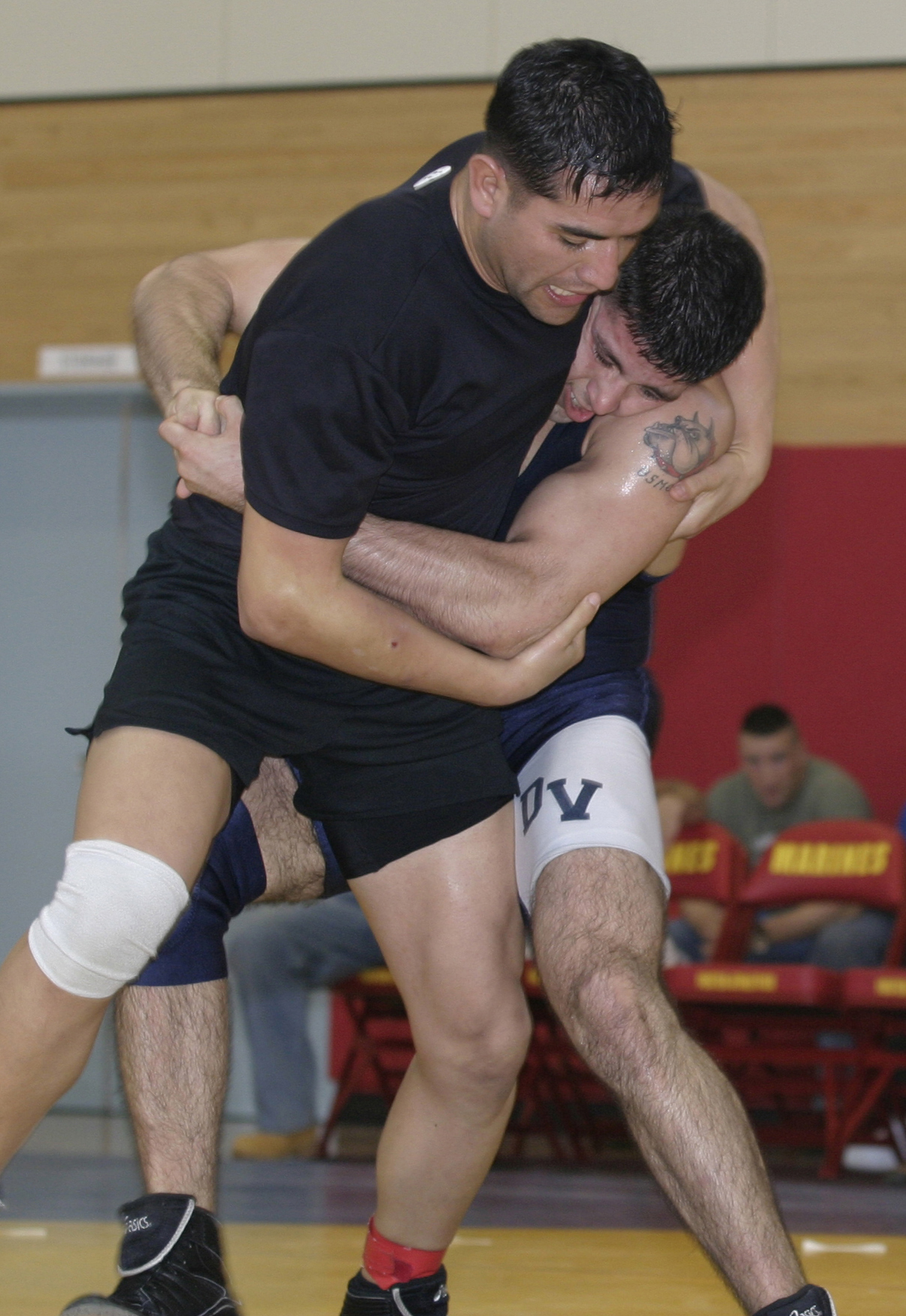
One wrestler is trying to get the back.

Clinch fighting or trapping is the part of stand-up fighting where the combatants are grappling in a clinch, typically using clinch holds. Clinching the opponent can be used to eliminate the opponent's effective usage of some kicks, punches, and melee weapons. The clinch can also be used as a medium to switch from stand-up fighting to ground fighting by using takedowns, throws or sweeps.

Clinch fighting is emphasized in both striking martial arts, such as Kun Khmer, Muay Thai, Lethwei, Boxing, and Sanda, as well as grappling martial arts, such as Wrestling, Judo, Sumo, Sambo and Brazilian Jiu-Jitsu.

== In combat sports ==
Clinch fighting is the primary focus of many combat sports such as wrestling and it is also a fundamental part of amateur wrestling, sambo, Muay Thai, Lethwei and mixed martial arts. The nature of the clinch during fighting depends on the rules involved in the different sports. Muay Thai puts much emphasis on strikes from the clinch, while judo focuses on throws. The rule common to all these forms is the allowance for the grappling necessary to form a clinch. Other combat sports like boxing or Taekwondo only allow clinching for a short time or do not allow it at all. If clinching is disallowed, the clinching fighter will be issued a warning, or the referee will restart the fight from a distance.

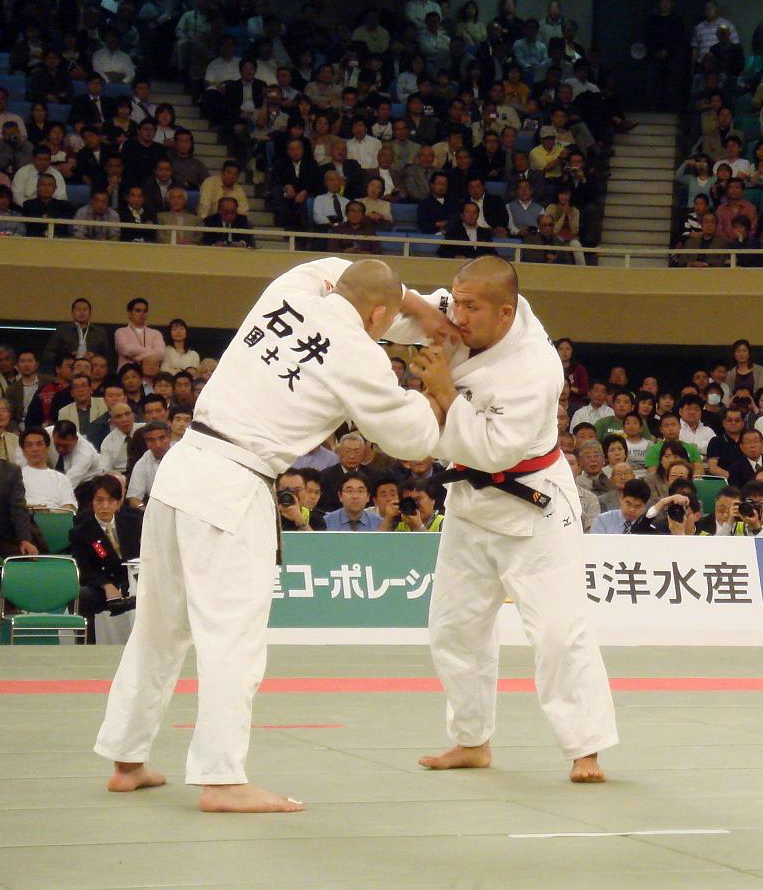
Grip fighting in the clinch and especially throwing is the primary focus in judo.

=== Grappling techniques ===
The clinch is a powerful tool for grapplers to advance into a dominant position in ground fighting, or is used for scoring points or winning a match such as a grand amplitude throw in amateur wrestling or an ippon in judo. The type of techniques employed are heavily dependent on whether or not the participants are wearing clothing heavy enough to be grabbed and used to gain leverage or unbalance them to set up throws. In competitive environments examples of such clothing would be the Dalian(Shuai Jiao Jacket),Judogi, Brazilian Jiu Jitsu gi or the Kurtka.

In competition where such clothing is being worn (almost exclusively referred to as a gi) there is a strong emphasis on grip fighting where the fighters will attempt to gain a dominant hold on the opponent's gi to unbalance and throw them. Examples of such competition would be judo, sambo or some Brazilian Jiu Jitsu competitions although in BJJ there is frequently a division for both gi and no-gi competition.

In no-gi competition getting double underhooks is generally considered advantageous, as the position can be used to perform throws or takedowns. Being behind the opponent in such a position is known as getting the back, and is generally considered even more advantageous, since it is harder for the opponent to defend from that position. A typical example of a technique that can be performed from this position is the suplex.

=== Hand and arm positions ===
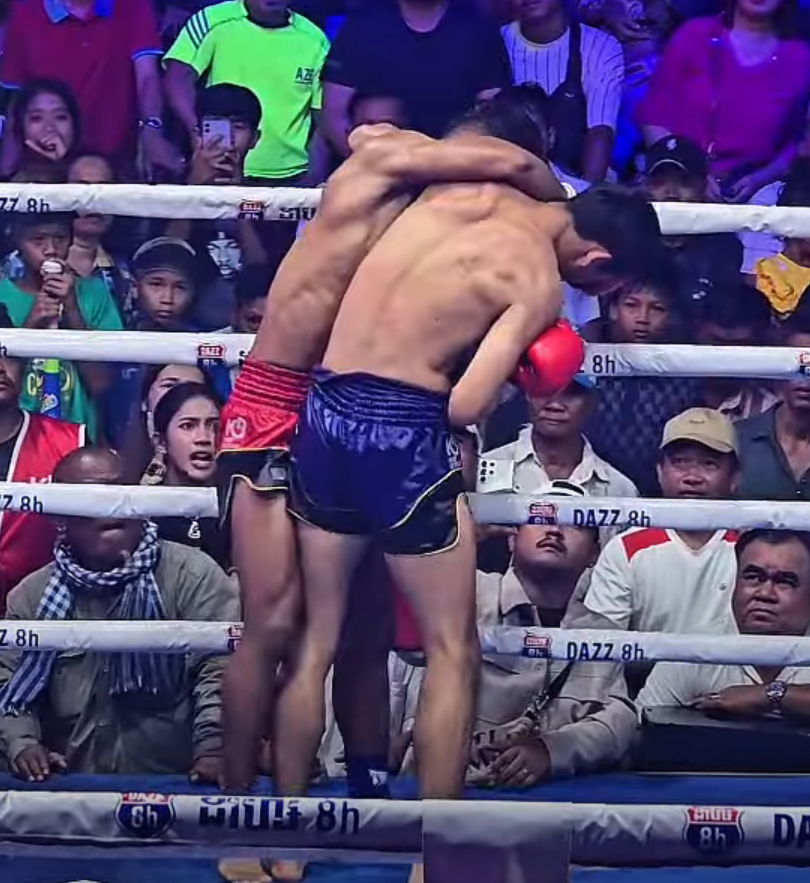
Kun Khmer Side Clinch

While clinching, the position of a fighter's arms is vitally important. The fighter always tries to keep his arms on the inside of his opponent's, allowing him to press his elbows together building a tighter grip. The fighter attempts to always hold his hands in a "cupping" position.

=== Striking techniques ===
A multitude of striking techniques exist that can be used effectively from the clinch. Punching, elbows, and knee strikes in the clinch, also sometimes referred to as "dirty boxing", are an important aspect of Muay Thai, Bajiquan, Wing Chun, Lethwei and mixed martial arts. Elbows and short looping punches such as hooks and uppercuts can be used effectively from the single collar tie position. Although disallowed in many combat sports, in Lethwei, the use of headbutt is encouraged and can also be effectively used from the clinch. The short distance in the clinch nullifies kicking to some extent, but some kicks are still effective. In Wing Chun, simultaneous grabs/traps at the elbows, wrists or behind the neck often open up a strike. In Muay Thai, the double collar tie is used to control an opponent while kneeing to the head or midsection, and stomps are used in some mixed martial arts competitions to kick the feet of the opponent.

=== Submission techniques ===
There are very few submission holds that can be applied effectively from the clinch, without engaging in ground fighting. The most well known submission hold is the guillotine choke, which can be attempted from a single or double collar tie. Height is advantageous in applying the guillotine choke from the clinch, since sufficient leverage is needed. Other possible, but more rare submissions from the clinch are the arm triangle, rear naked choke, and Ezekiel choke.

== See also ==
- Grappling
- Ground fighting
- Stand-up fighting
