= Ground fighting =

Hand-to-hand combat on the ground

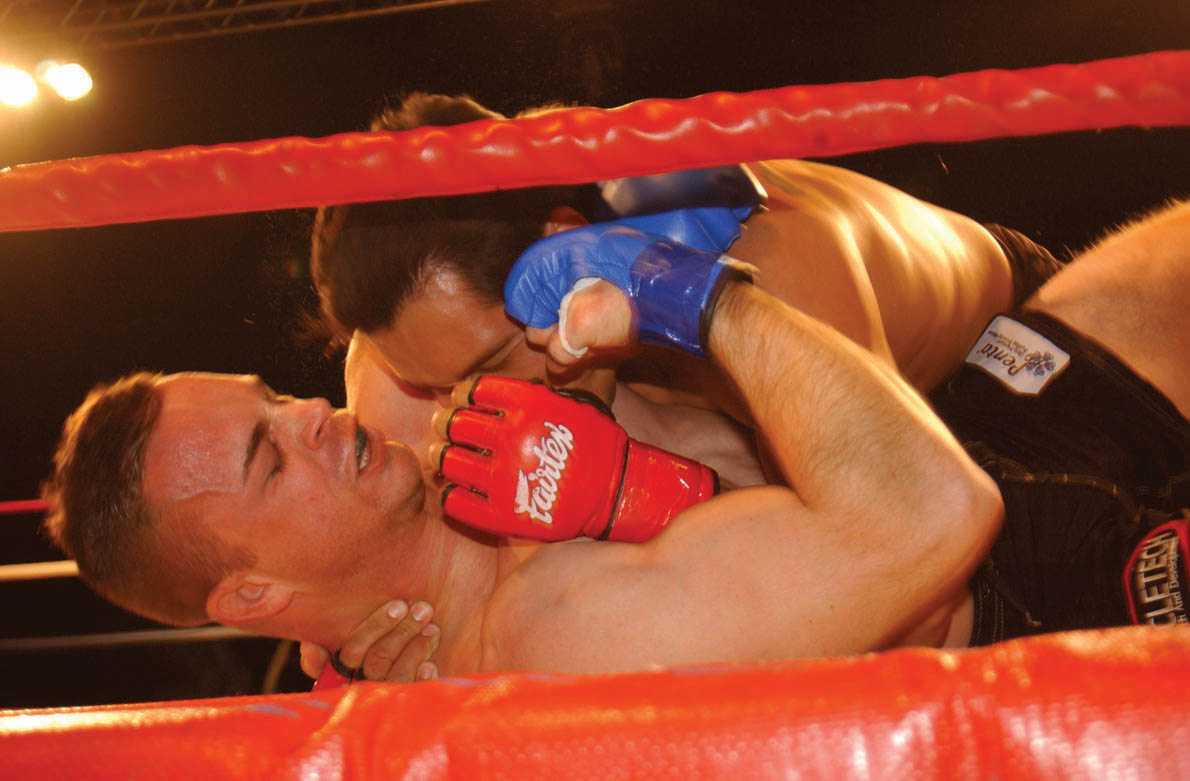
Ground fighting taking place in a mixed martial arts bout

Ground fighting (also called ground work or ground game) is hand-to-hand combat which takes place while the combatants are on the ground. The term is commonly used in mixed martial arts and other combat sports, as well as various forms of martial arts to designate the set of grappling techniques employed by a combatant that is on the ground. It is the main focus of Brazilian jiu-jitsu and is featured in varying amounts in judo, jujutsu, sambo, shoot wrestling, hapkido, various other forms of wrestling, Dishuquan (Dog Kung Fu), and some schools of shuai jiao.

Similarly to clinch fighting, ground fighting implies that the combatants are at a very close range, usually involving one or both combatants grappling the opponent using various grappling holds. Depending on the positioning of the combatants, the proximity can allow for techniques such as biting, chokeholds, fish-hooking, eye-gouging, joint locks, pressure point techniques, or various strikes.

== Striking on the ground ==
Traditionally neglected by most grappling arts, striking on the ground is an important aspect of ground fighting. Typically, a top position is better for various strikes than a bottom position, simply because the combatant in the top position can generate the distance and movement needed for effective strikes, while the bottom combatant is restricted by the ground and by the combatant on top. Another factor is gravity, which is in favor of the top combatant when they are striking downwards. In addition, the effect of ground strikes may be amplified, depending on the area struck, by the strike driving the opponent into the ground. The types of strikes that can be employed effectively depend on the particular grappling position. Common strikes include elbows, headbutts, knees and punches.

== Gallery ==
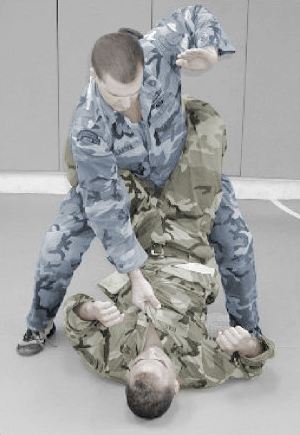
Although the guard is generally considered an advantageous position in pure grappling, punches can be very effective from the top.

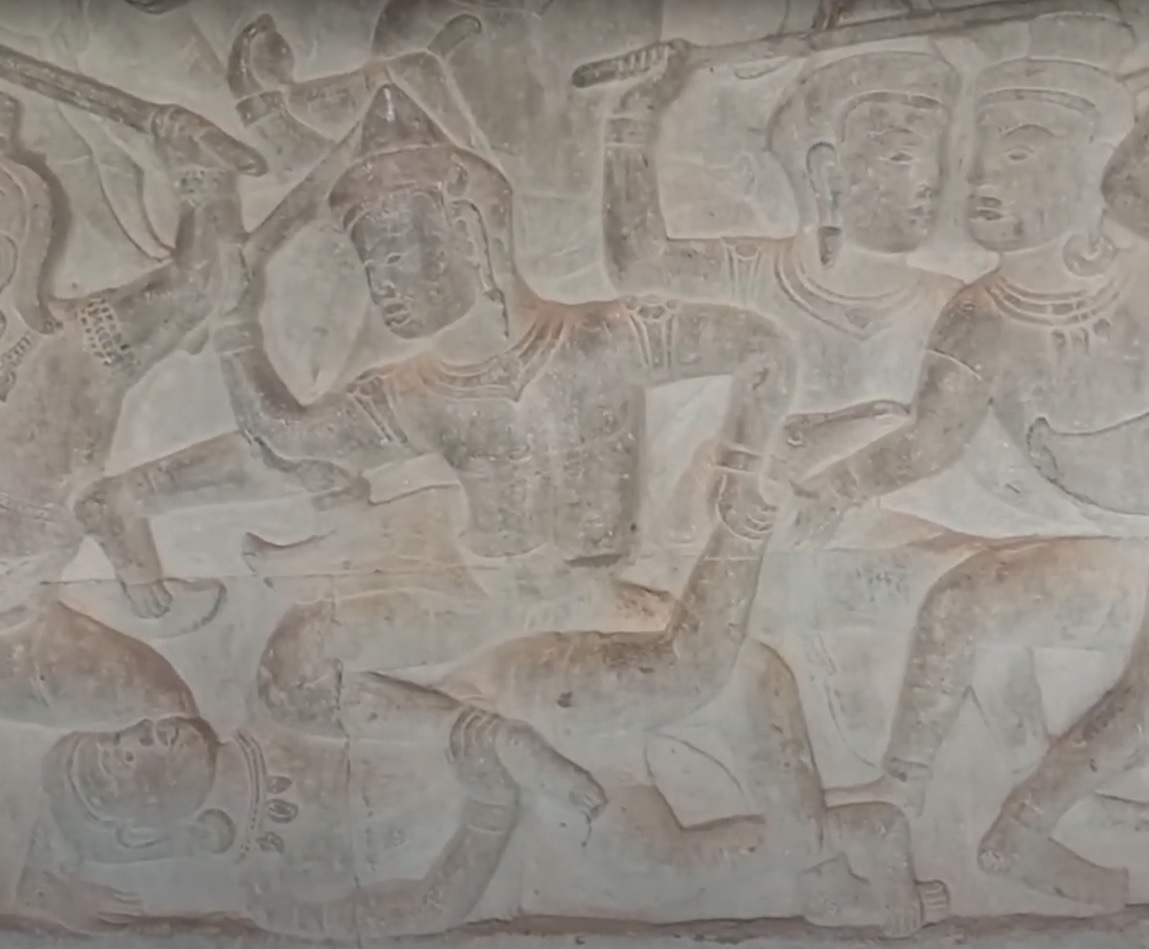
Bas-relief of knee mount. Located at Angkor Wat(1100's A.D.) in the Kingdom of Cambodia.

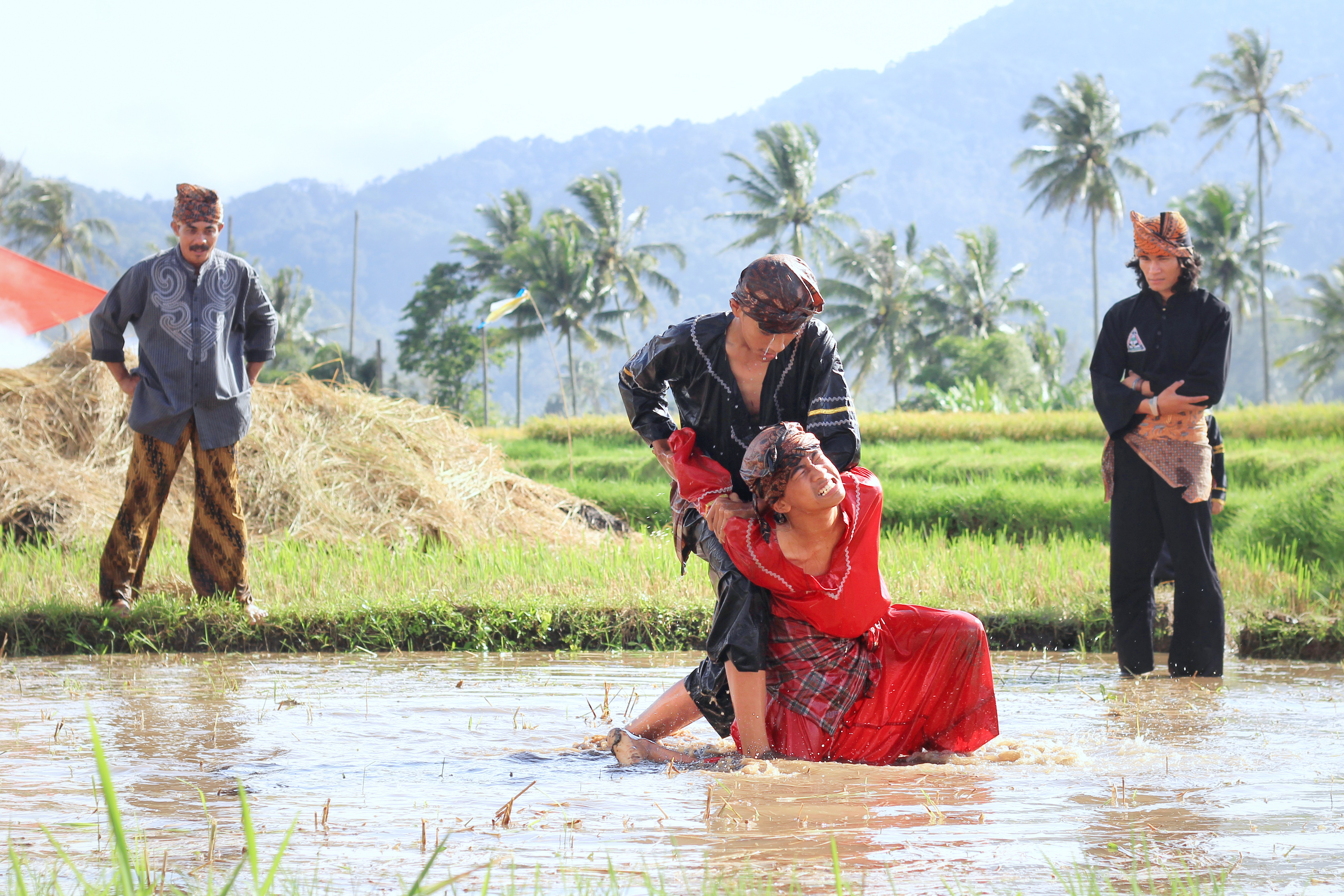
Submission lock on grounded opponent in Silat Minangkabau.

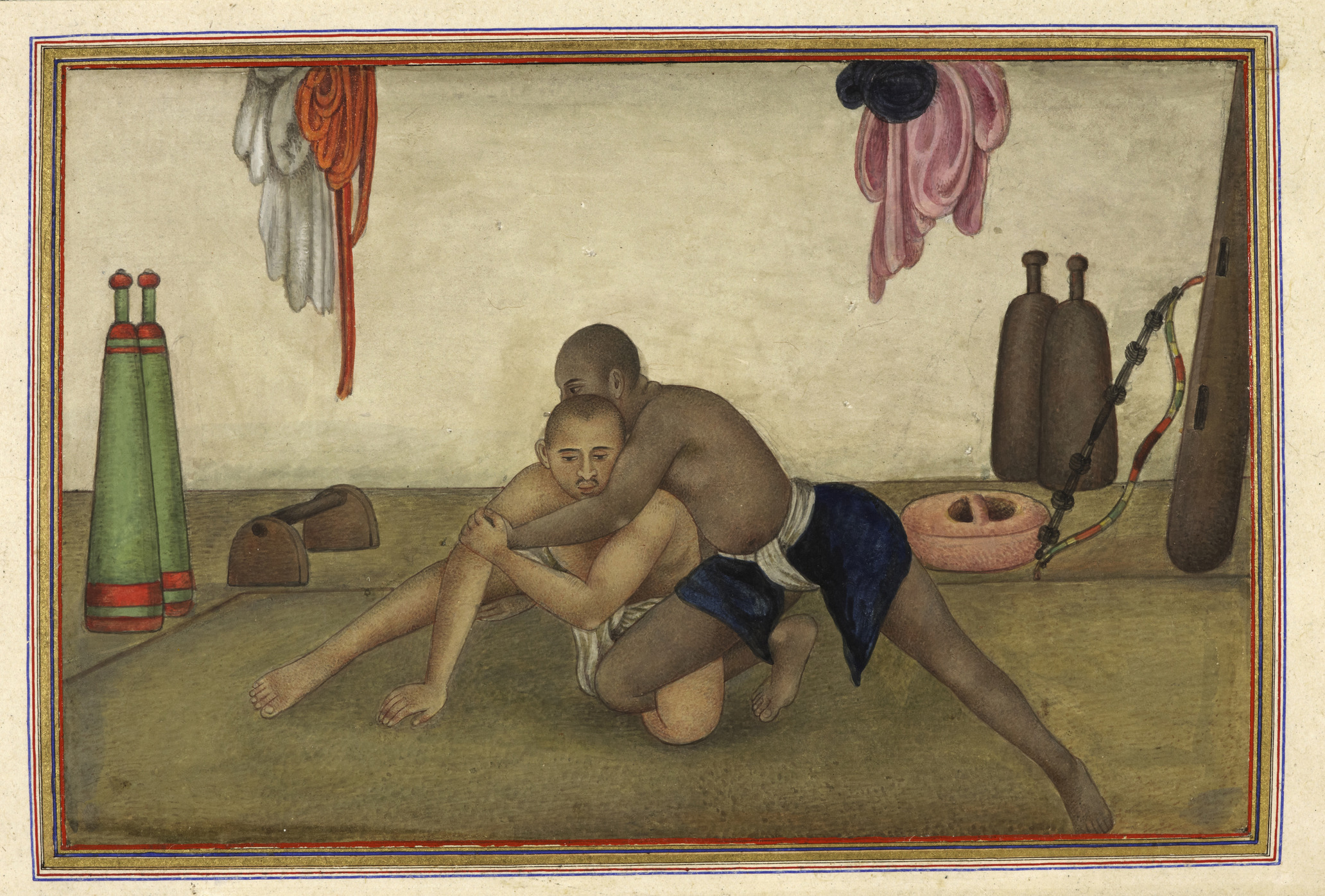
Ground fighting from Pehlwani in a drawing from 1825.

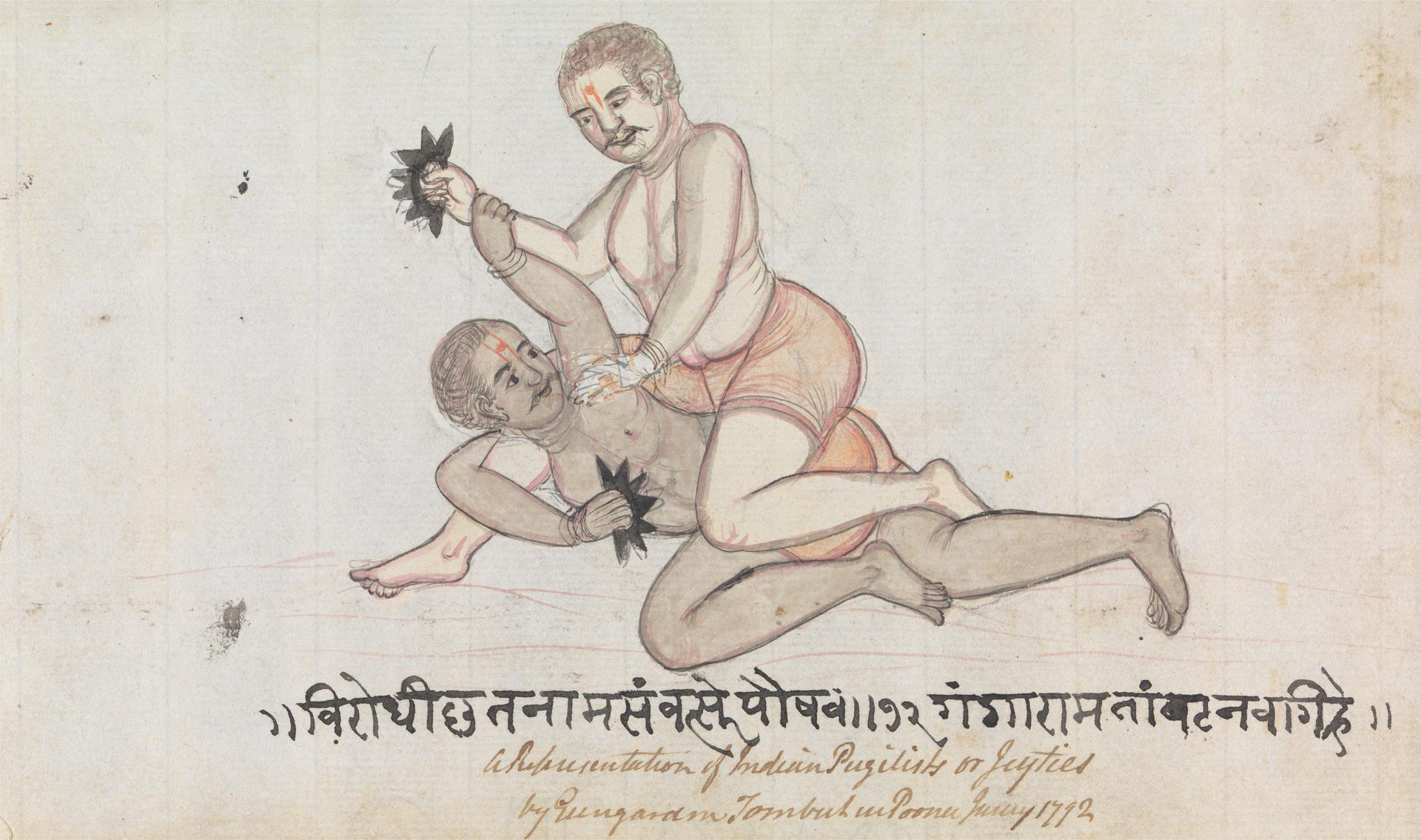
Drawing of ground fighting in Indian wrestling(1792 A.D.).

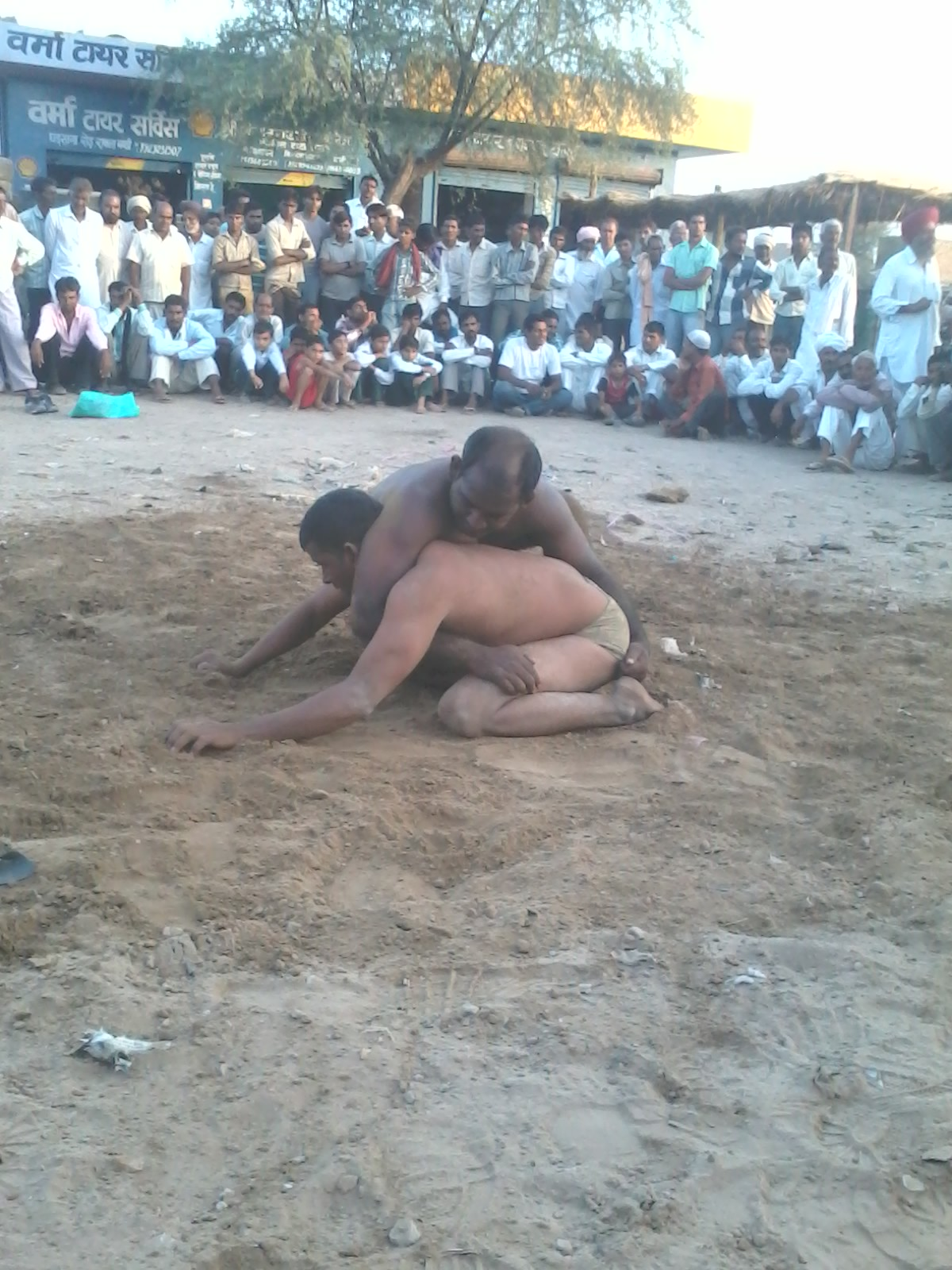
Ground fighting in Indian wrestling.

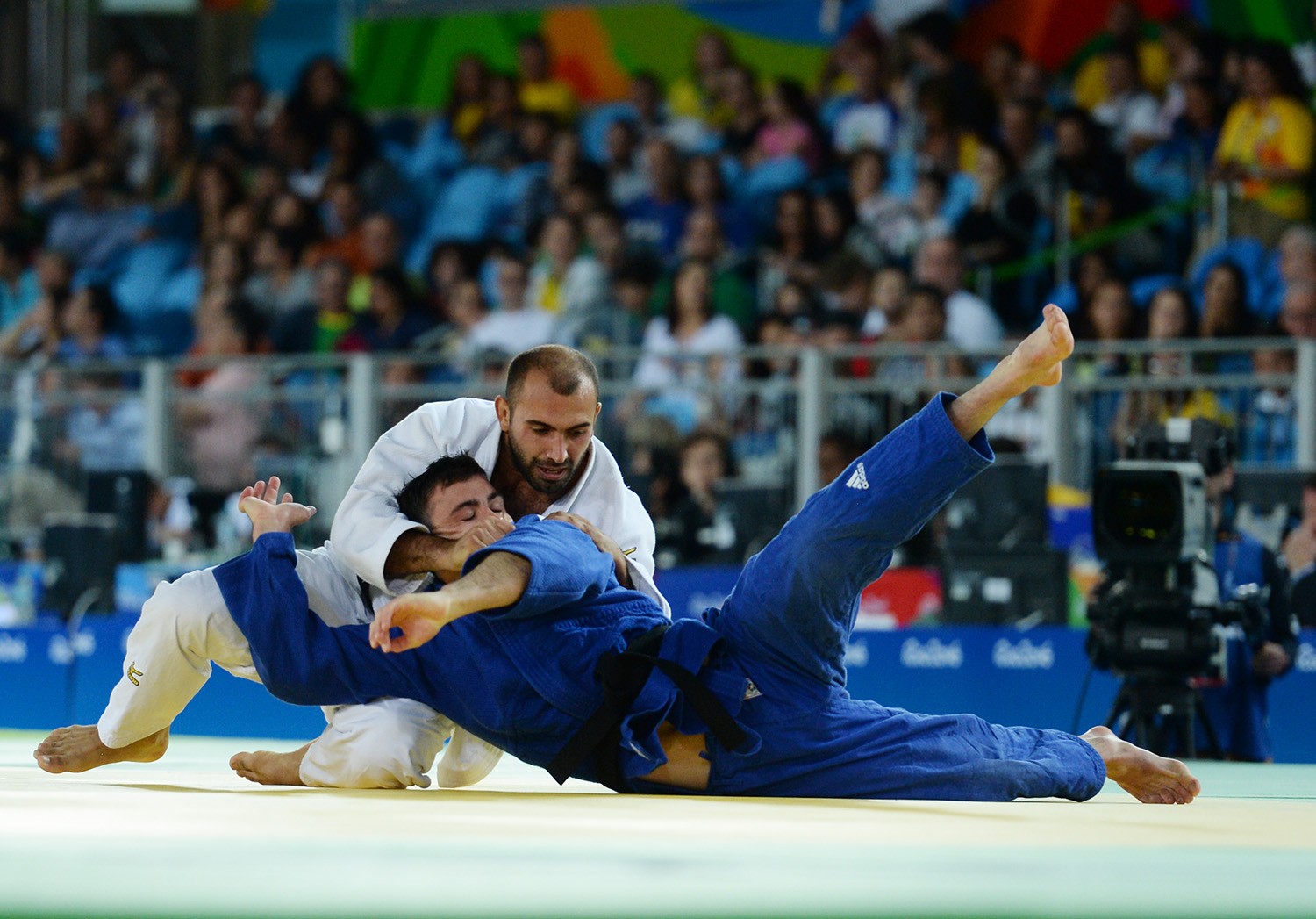
Ground fighting in Judo.

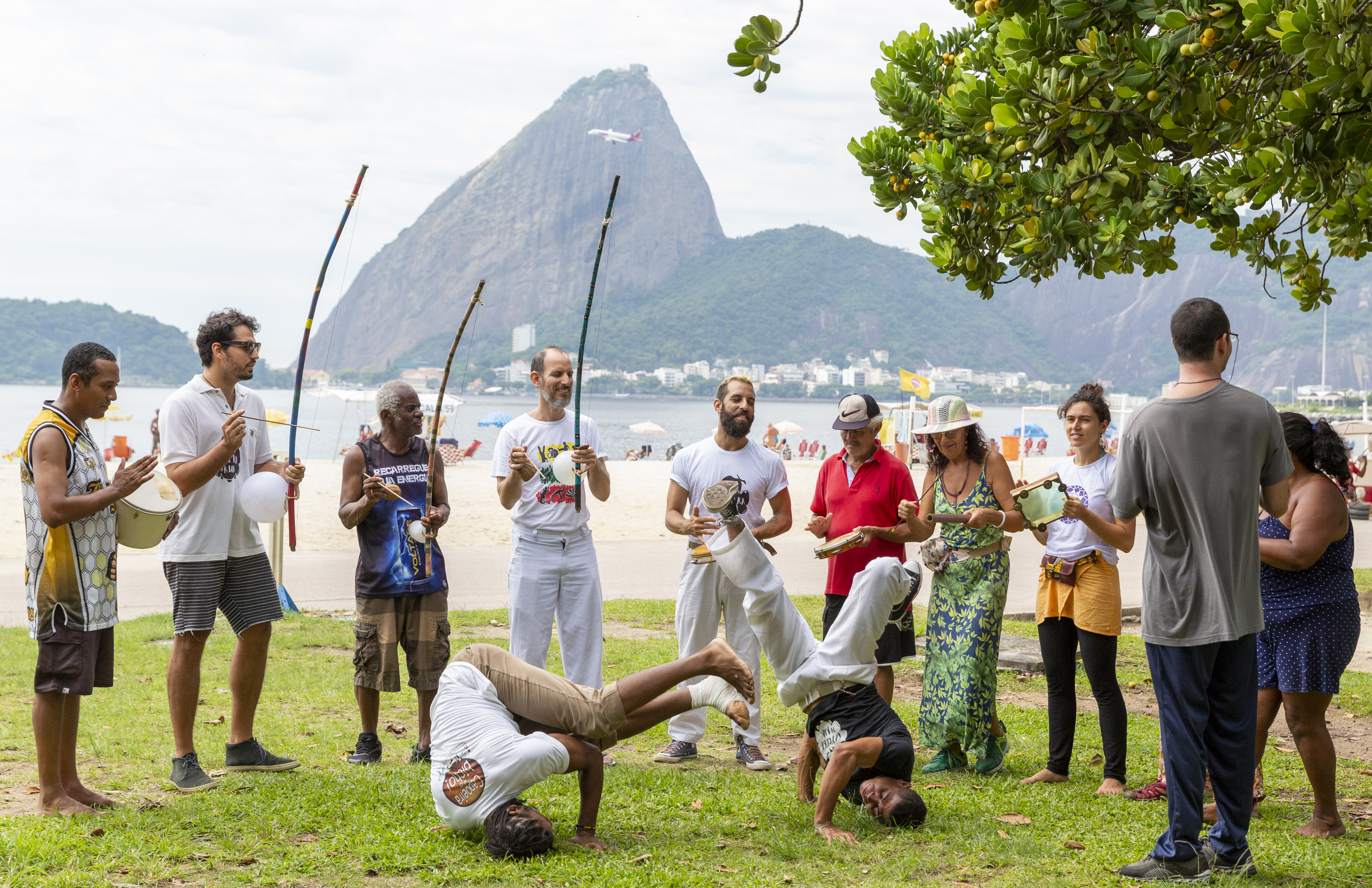
Ground fighting in Capoeira

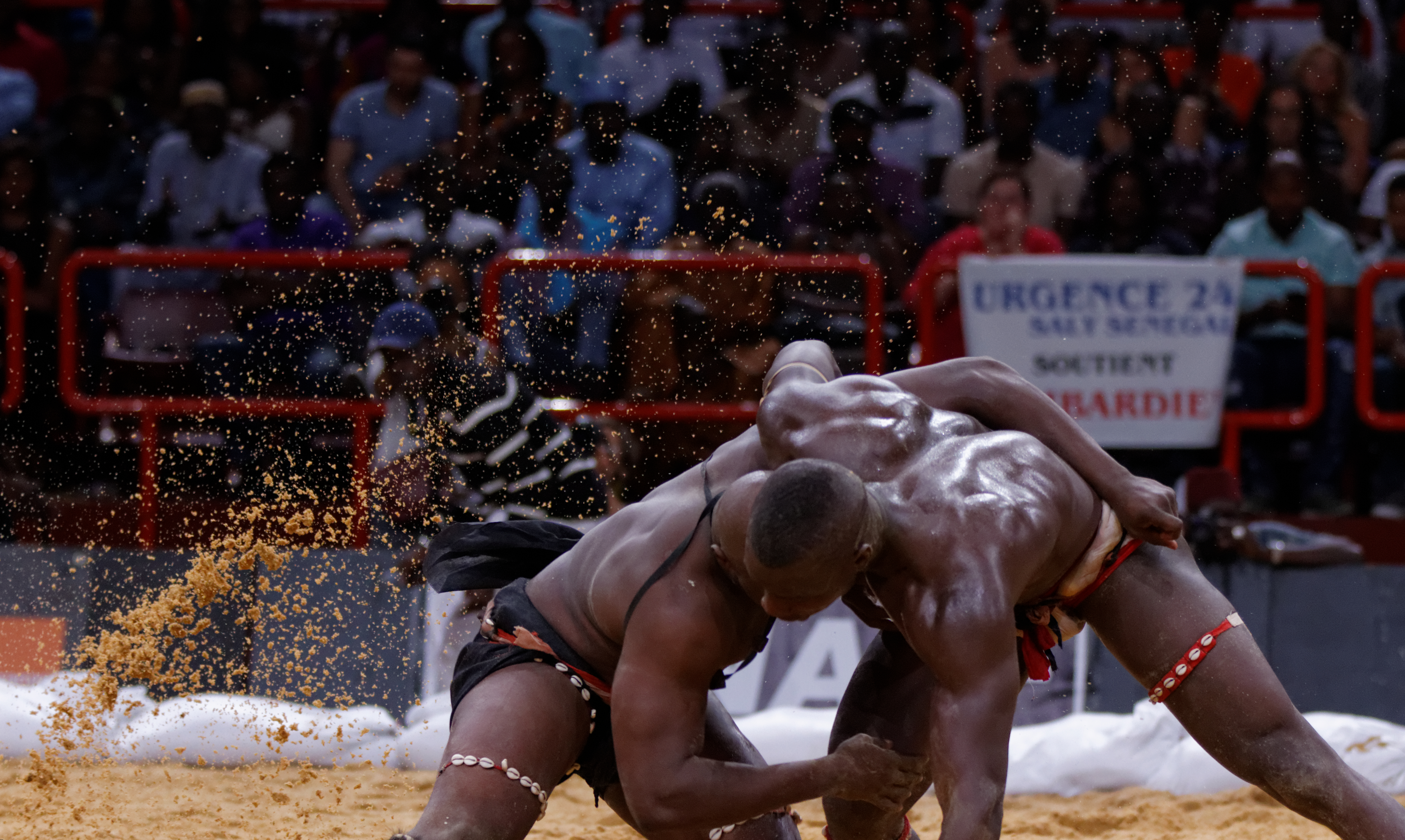
Ground fighting in Senegalese wrestling

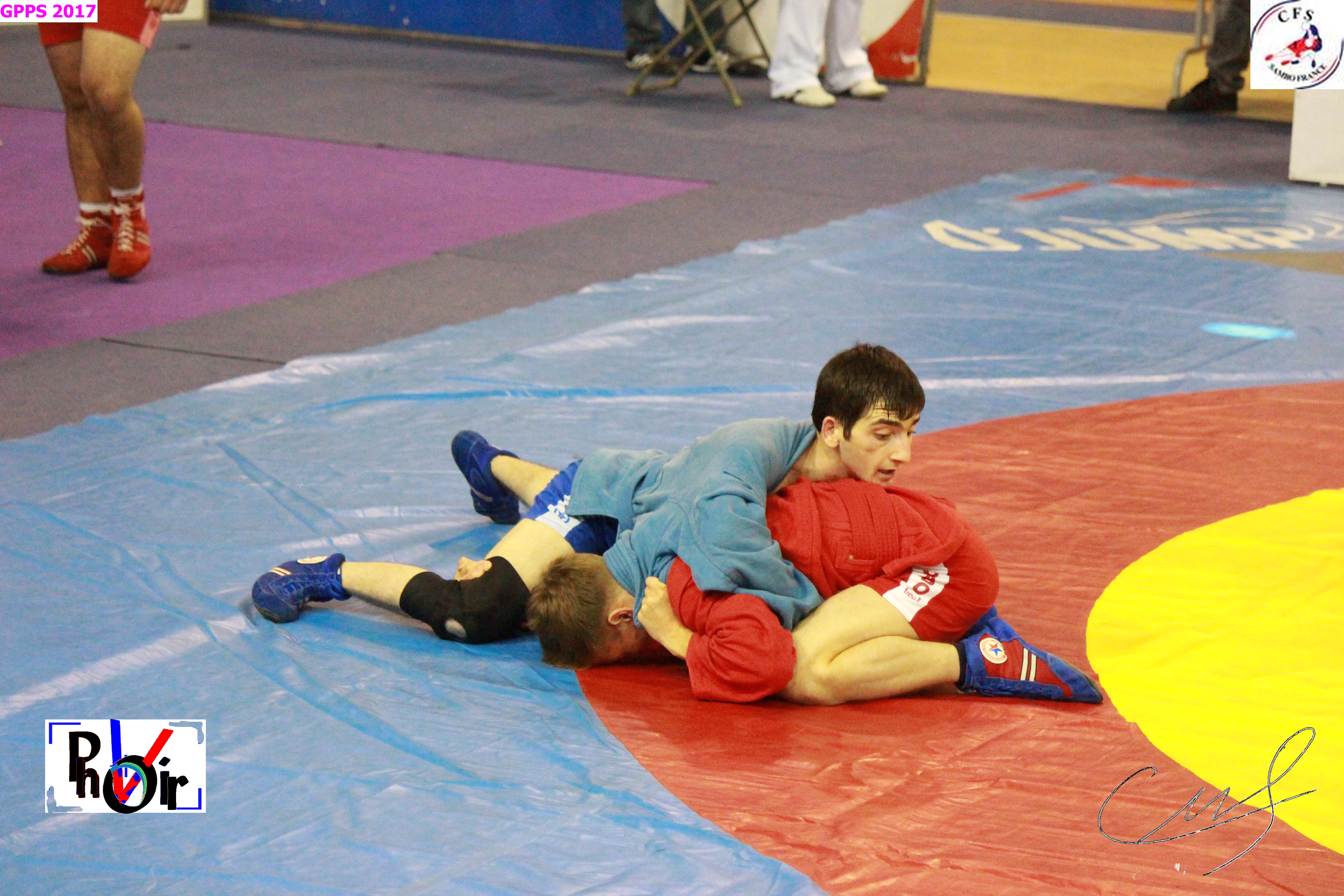
Ground fighting in Sambo

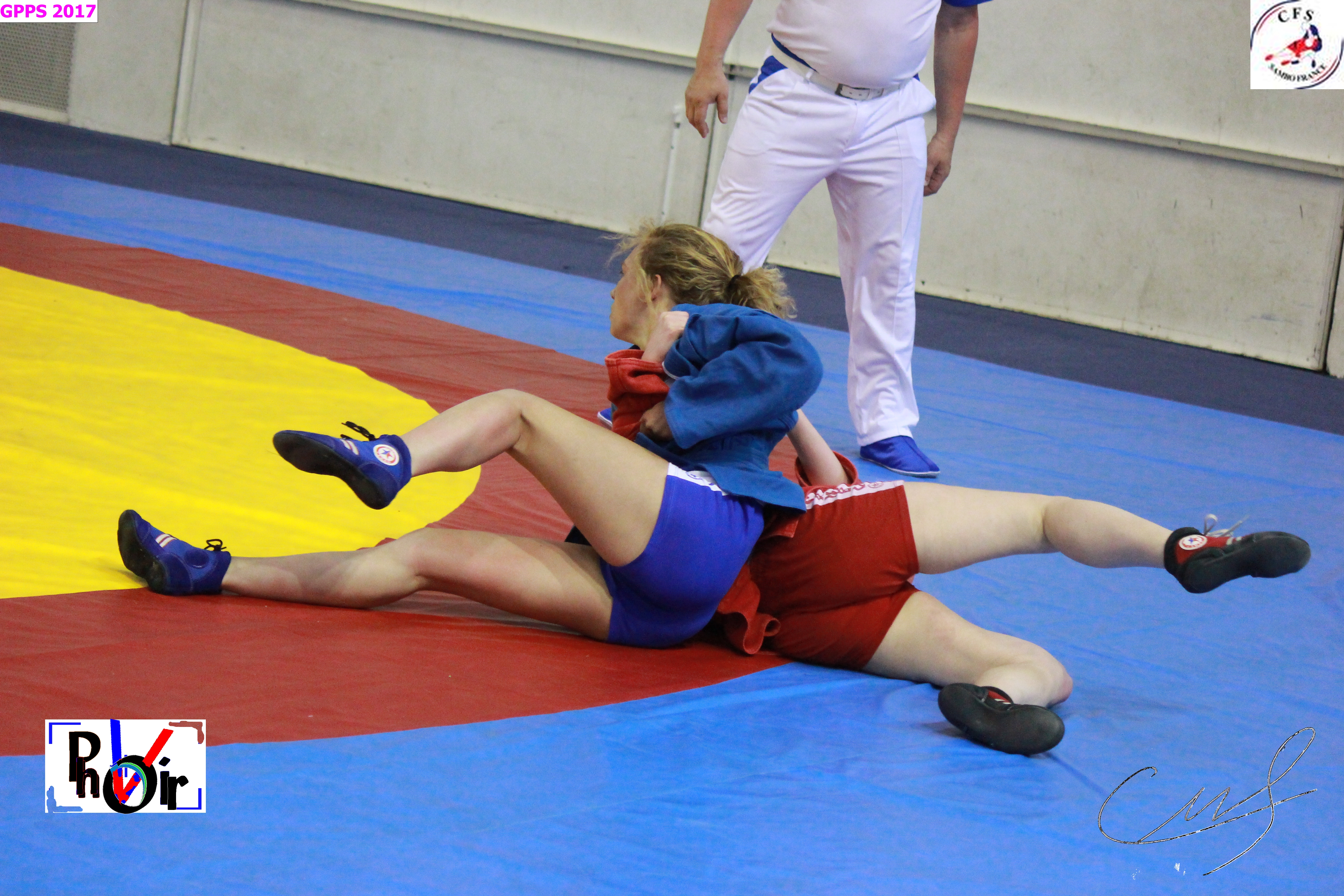
Ground fighting in Sambo

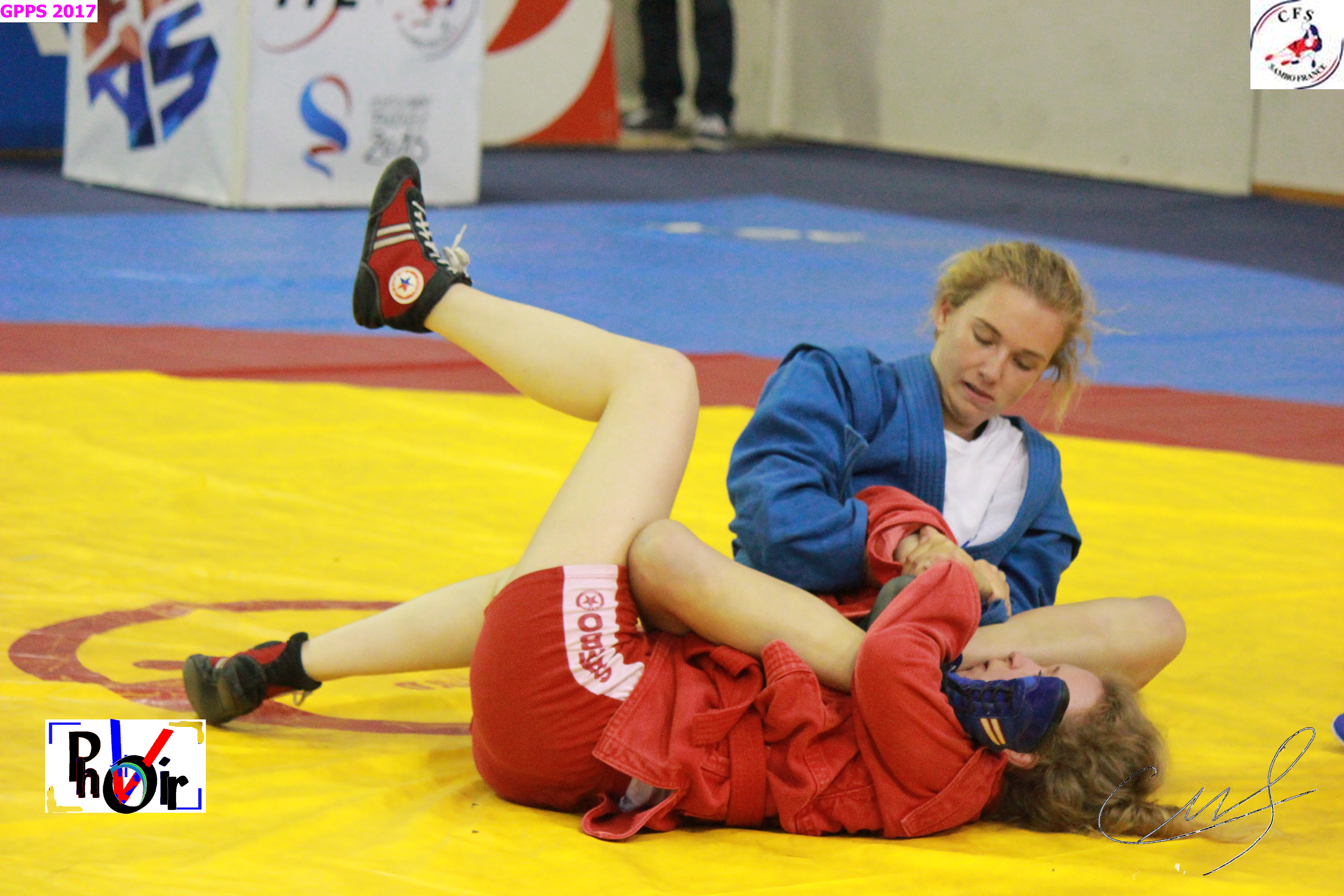
Ground fighting in Sambo

== See also ==
- Clinch fighting
- Combatives
- Grappling
- Stand-up fighting
- Submission grappling
- Sweep (martial arts)
