= Piledriver (professional wrestling) =

Professional wrestling move

A piledriver is a professional wrestling driver move in which the wrestler grabs their opponent, turns them upside-down, and drops into a sitting or kneeling position, driving the opponent head-first into the mat. The technique is said to have been innovated by Wild Bill Longson.

The name is taken from a piece of construction equipment, also called a pile driver, that drives countless massive impacts on the top of a large major foundation support, burying it in the ground slowly with each impact. The act of performing a piledriver is called "piledriving". Someone who has recently been the victim of a piledriver is said to have been "piledriven" (e.g. "The wrestler was piledriven into the canvas").

Notable wrestlers who have regularly used a piledriver during their career include Jerry Lawler, Bret Hart, Ray Stevens, Harley Race, Paul Orndorff, Abismo Negro, The Undertaker, Kane, The Brain Busters, Buddy Rogers, Minoru Suzuki, Karl Gotch, Danny Davis, and Kazuchika Okada.

The piledriver is often seen as one of the most dangerous moves in wrestling. The reverse piledriver is directly responsible for shortening the career of Stone Cold Steve Austin when his opponent, Owen Hart, inadvertently botched the move, legitimately injuring Austin's neck at the SummerSlam 1997. Due to this, the move is banned in the WWE with the exceptions of Kane and The Undertaker due to their experience and having already established the Tombstone (kneeling belly-to-belly variant) as a finisher. However, in recent years, certain variations of the piledriver have been allowed to be performed by experienced wrestlers and it is not banned in some other wrestling promotions such as All Elite Wrestling.

== Danger and precautions ==
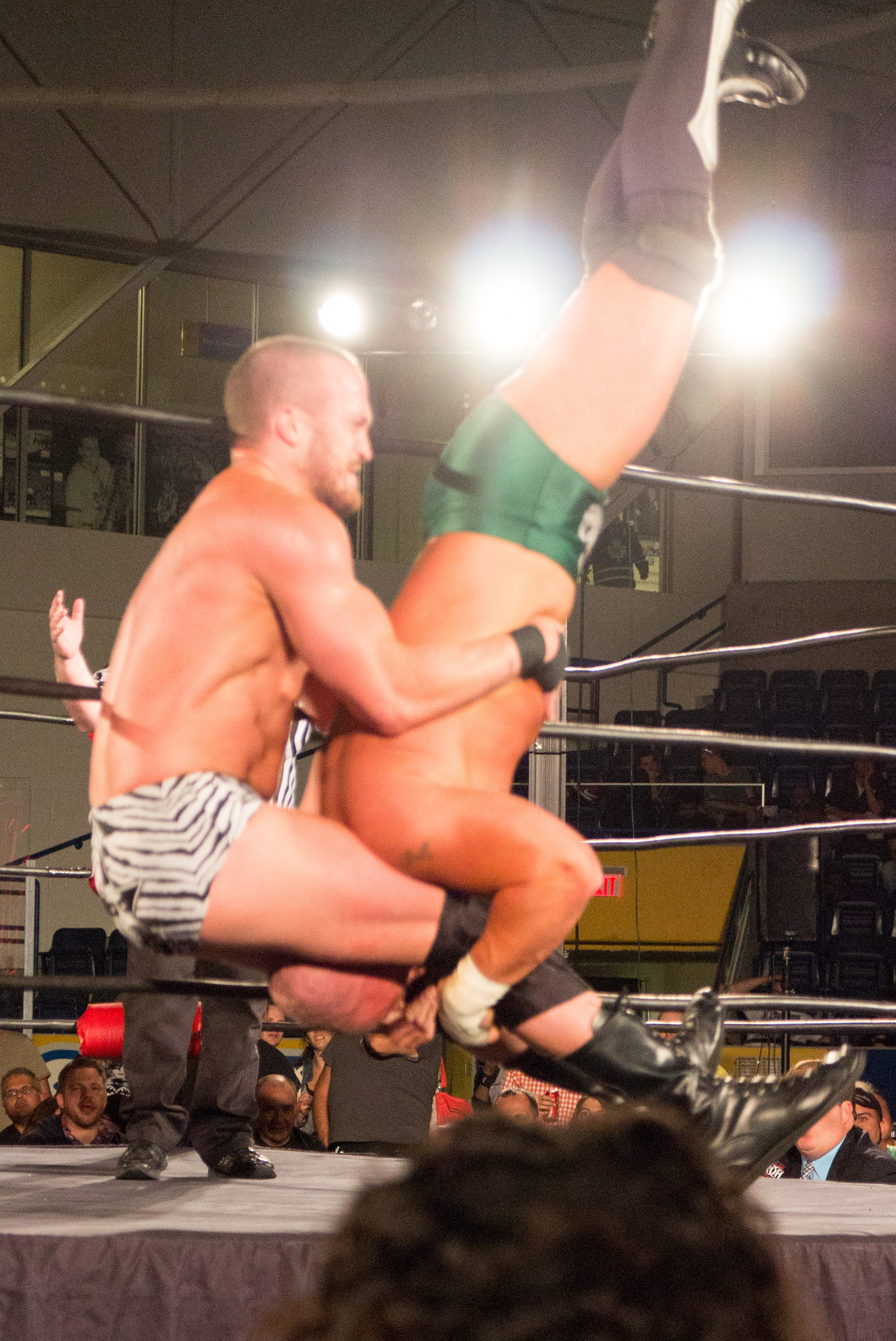
Mike Bennett (left) improperly executing a piledriver on B. J. Whitmer in 2013. Here, Whitmer's head is positioned below Bennett's legs and is unprotected. The impact from the move gave Whitmer a neck injury.

The piledriver is generally considered a dangerous maneuver in wrestling because of the potential impact on the head and compression of the neck. The proper way to execute the move, in most cases, is for the wrestler performing the move to tuck the opponent's head between their legs before falling to the mat (there are variations that are performed differently, as the list below indicates). If done in this manner, the wrestler receiving the move will land with little or no contact made with the mat, and thus not run the risk of injury. If the head is not secured and is protruding from between the wrestler's legs, the wrestler receiving the move risks serious injury and potential paralysis, as they will likely land with the entire weight of their body on the top of their head. Perhaps the most famous example of an injury from an improperly performed piledriver came at the 1997 WWF SummerSlam event. In a match between Owen Hart and Stone Cold Steve Austin, Hart was to perform a reverse piledriver on Austin, who later said that he was not sure if the move was a good idea to perform, as he was unsure if his head could properly be protected. As Austin had feared, Hart botched the move and dropped Austin on top of his head. The impact jammed Austin's neck and left him temporarily paralyzed. He continued and finished the match, but stayed away from the ring for two months to recover from the injury. The physical demands of Austin's standing as one of the top stars in the WWF did not allow much downtime for him to rest and take care of the injury, and as his career progressed, the damage got worse. Austin underwent fusion surgery on his neck in 1999, but it never fully healed. By 2002, Austin's doctors told him that he risked permanent disability if he did not retire, and he finally did so in April 2003.

The piledriver was officially banned in the World Wrestling Federation (WWF, now known as the WWE) in 2000, unless the wrestler has special permission to use the move. In a discussion in 2007, Stephanie McMahon said that only two wrestlers were allowed to use the move, "two of the stronger guys", Undertaker and Kane. In fact, The Undertaker's tombstone piledriver continued to be his finishing move until his retirement in 2020. The piledriver is also banned in many other promotions and certain cities. It is also considered an automatic disqualification in professional wrestling matches held in Tennessee, as the move is banned in that state. In some promotions in the United Kingdom, the move can result in not only a disqualification, but also a fine. In Mexico, the piledriver (called a martinete) is an automatic disqualification. In AAA: If the move is done as part of an attack, the person receiving the move would instantly be stretched off.

Because of the dangers of the piledriver, it is classed as a foul and is illegal in mixed martial arts under the Unified Rules of Mixed Martial Arts.

== Variations ==
=== Aided piledriver ===
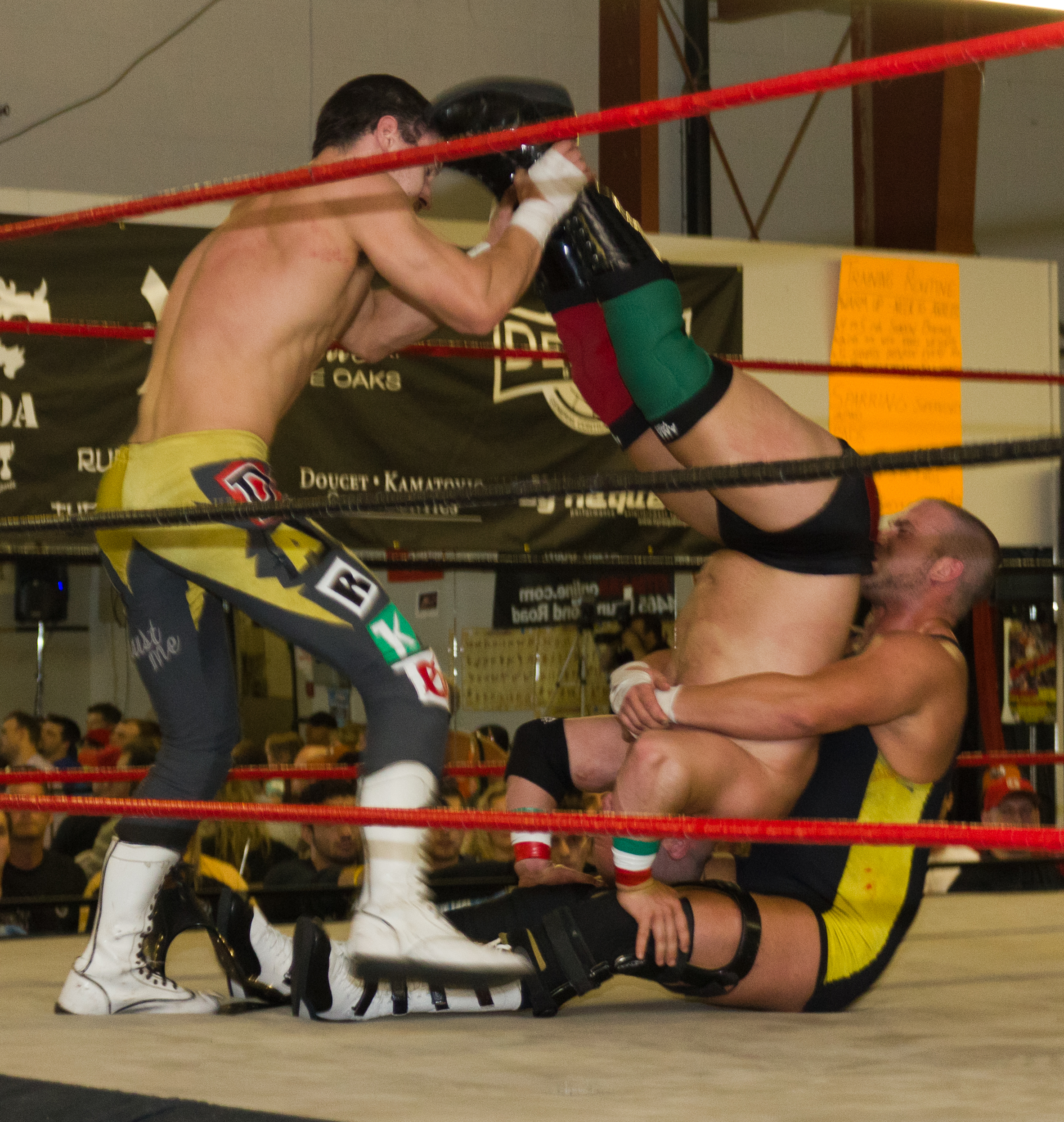
Jake O'Reilly (right) Anthony Darko (Left) execute an aided piledriver.

Any double-team move in which one wrestler helps another to perform a piledriver on an opponent by pushing down on the opponent's legs for more impact. In a variation of the move, the second wrestler jumps off the turnbuckle while pushing the opponent's feet downward for even more damage; this is well known as a spike piledriver (not to be confused with a one-man spike piledriver).

=== Argentine piledriver ===
The move is executed from an Argentine backbreaker rack (face up, with the neck and one leg cradled) position. The wrestler pushes the opponent forward while holding the opponent's leg with one arm, and the head with the other arm, and then sits down, driving the opponent head first down to the floor. Super Dragon used this move throughout his career, calling it the Psycho Driver. He also has a cutthroat version (draping one of the opponent's arm across their neck, similarly to the setup of a Cobra Clutch) called Psycho Driver III.

=== Backflip piledriver ===
The user approaches an opponent from behind and grasps his torso with his legs, similar to a bodyscissors. The user then shifts their weight to suddenly roll backward until they are prone, pulling the opponent behind them so that their neck hits the ground in a fluid motion. An aerial version of this technique was innovated by Manami Toyota as the Victory Star Drop. Due to the high danger of this movement, it is not very common to see.

=== Back-to-belly piledriver ===
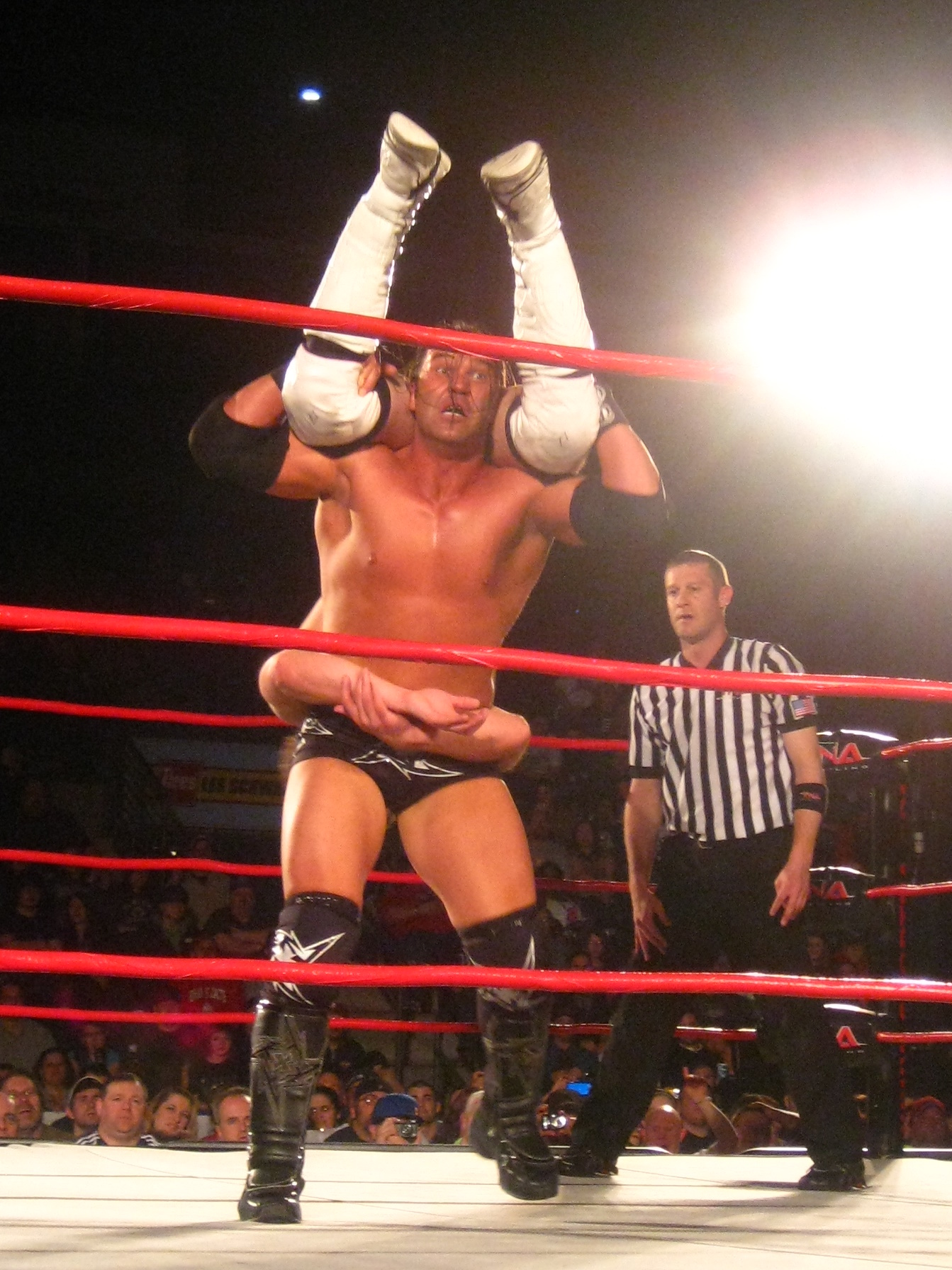
Kazarian performs the back-to belly piledriver.

The wrestler bends forward or crouches in front of their opponent, grabs hold of the opponent around the legs and stands up, lifting the opponent upside down facing the wrestler's back. The wrestler then either sits down or drops onto their knees, driving the opponent's head down to the mat. It was invented by Takao Omori as the Axe Guillotine Driver. Hangman Page would executed the move in a kneeling position called the Rite of Passage/Dead Eye, while Genki Horiguchi and later Orange Cassidy use a sitout variation called the Beach Break.

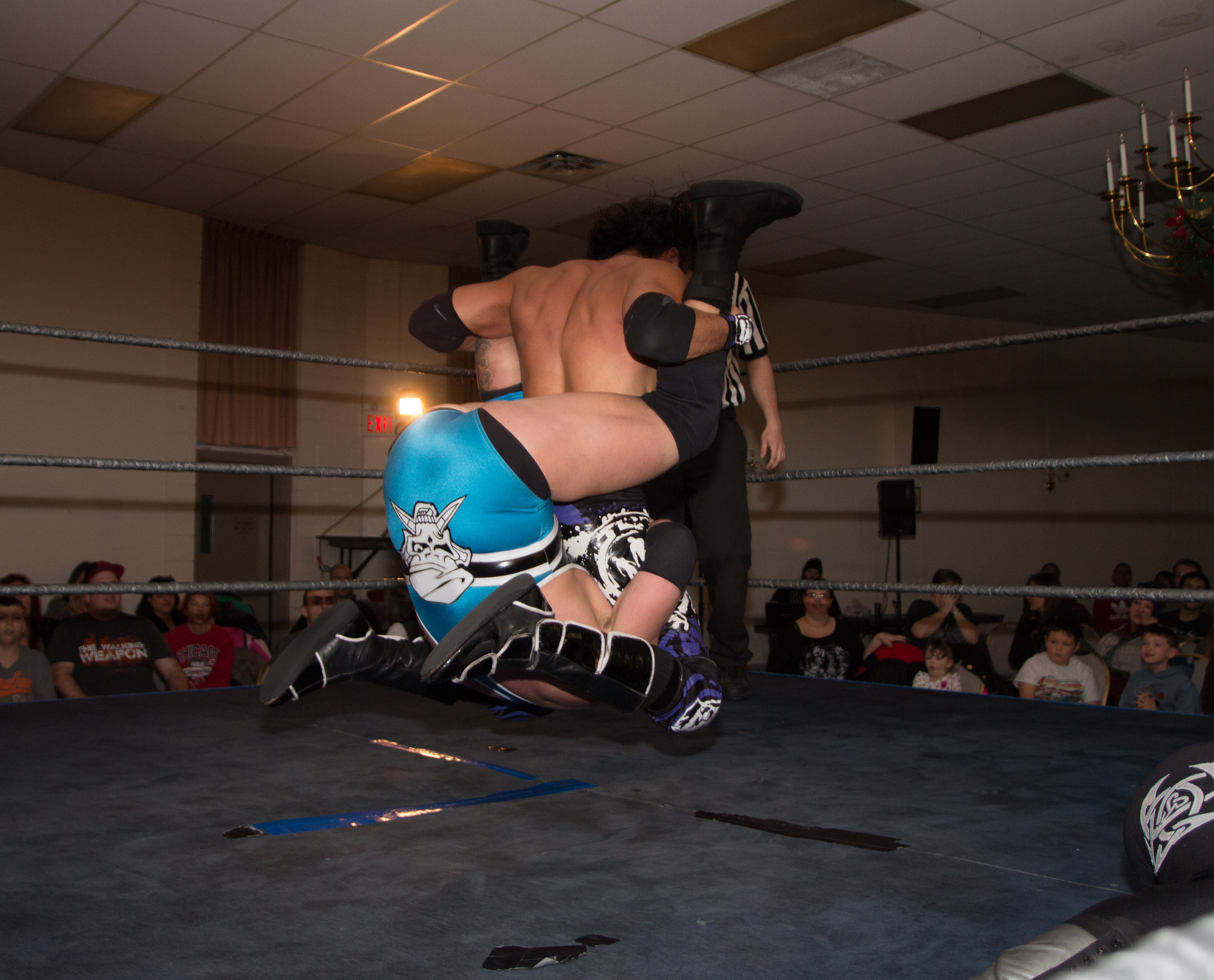
Trent performs Crunchie.

A variation on this, sometimes known as the sunset driver, sees the attacking wrestler hook the opponent's legs underneath their arms while holding the opponent up in the back to belly position. From here, the wrestler drops to their knees, driving the opponent's head into the mat. This move will often see the attacking wrestler hold the move after landing for a rana style pinfall attempt. Trent Beretta calls it the Crunchie.

==== Over-the-shoulder back-to-belly piledriver ====
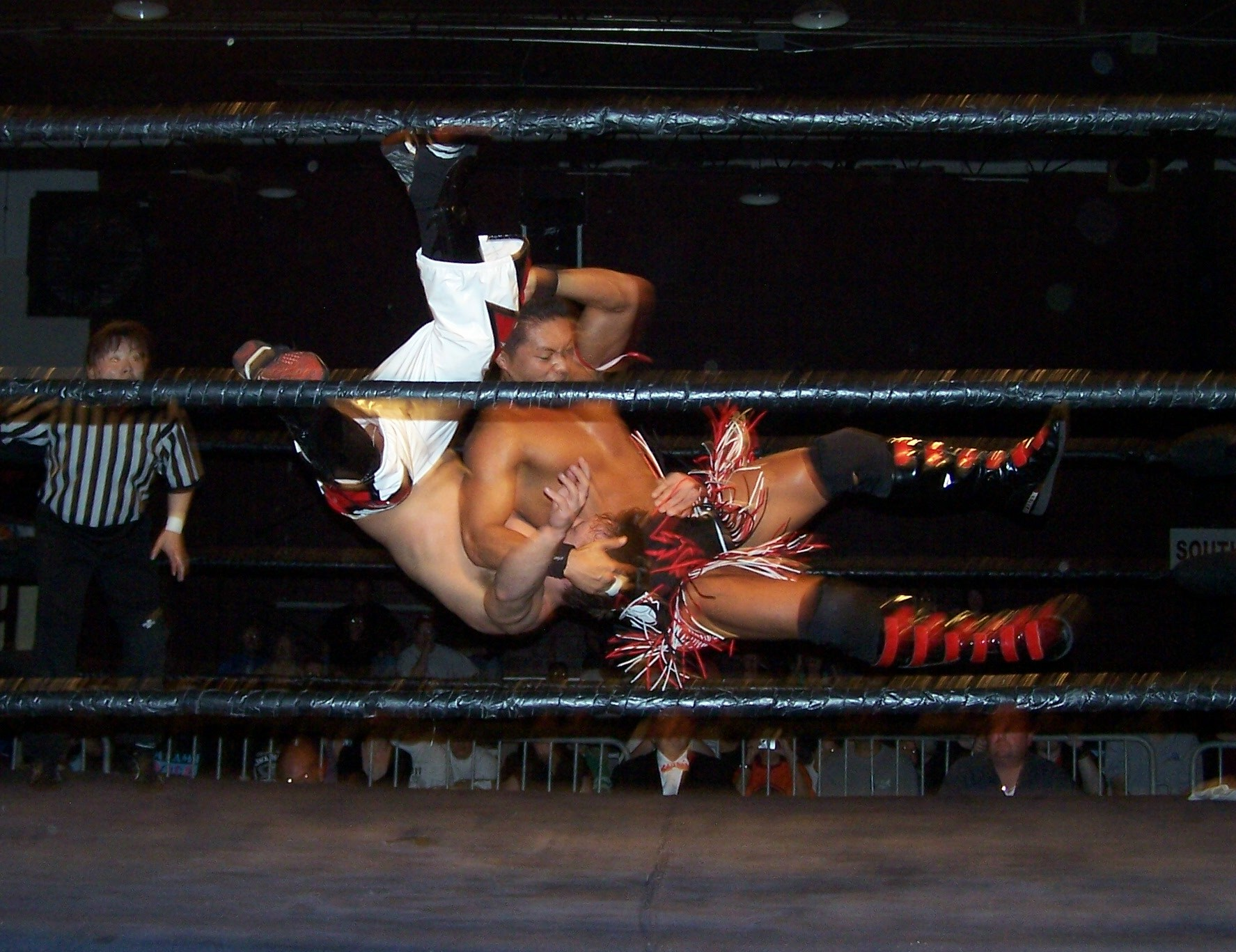
CIMA performs Schwein.

This move begins with the wrestler facing the opponent. From there, the wrestler will pick up the opponent and place them over their shoulder so that the opponent's head is dangling over the wrestler's back by the waist of the wrestler. The wrestler then holds the opponent in place by holding their leg with one arm and applies a headlock to the opponent with their other arm, bending the opponent across the attacker's back. The wrestler then drops to a seated position, driving the head and upper back of the opponent into the ground. This move was innovated by Mariko Yoshida, who named the move the Air Raid Crash, and was popularized by Fit Finlay, who dubbed it the Celtic Cross, Cima, who uses it as the Schwein, Nova, who called it Kryptonite Krunch, Sheamus who dubs the move White Noise, Tommaso Ciampa uses the move calling it Air Raid Crash, and Taichi as Black Mephisto. A common variation was popularized by Hiromu Takahashi, where he puts his opponents into a Fireman's Carry, before Swinging his opponents into the over-the-shoulder back-to-belly Piledriver, calling it the Time Bomb.

Another variation of the move called the Air Raid Crash Neckbreaker or Reverse Neckbreaker has the wrestler performing the move drop the opponent's head on their knee rather than the ground. Frequently used by Kazuchika Okada, Colt Cabana and Toni Storm.

==== Pumphandle back-to-belly piledriver ====
The user of this move first starts by putting the opponent into a pumphandle position, then lifting them into the air perpendicular to the ground and upside down, rotating them so that their back is against the chest. The user then proceeds to fall to a seated position, while dropping the opponent onto their head, neck, and/or shoulders. This move was popularized by Super Dragon, who called it Psycho Driver II.

=== Belly-to-back piledriver ===
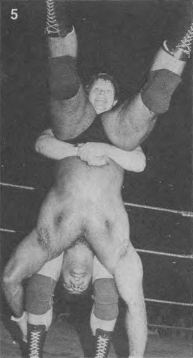
Bob Backlund about to perform a belly-to-back piledriver on Don Muraco during a professional wrestling match, circa 1982

Also known as a Texas, Sit-out, or traditional piledriver, this is the classic and original piledriver technique. From a position in which the opponent is bent forward and the opponent's head is tucked between the attackers thighs in a standing headscissors, the wrestler grabs around the opponent's midsection and lifts so that the opponent is held upside down facing in the same direction as the wrestler, the wrestler then drops to a sitting position with the opponent's head falling between the wrestler's thighs down to the mat.

A Snapping version of this move exists which sees the wrestler perform this move in one quick motion all at once for greater impact. Toni Storm uses this version as a finisher called Storm Zero.

==== Kneeling belly-to-back piledriver ====
A variation of the piledriver where instead of dropping to a sitting position as in the basic belly-to-back piledriver, the wrestler drops to a kneeling position. It is often referred to as an Inverted Tombstone.

=== Cradle piledriver ===
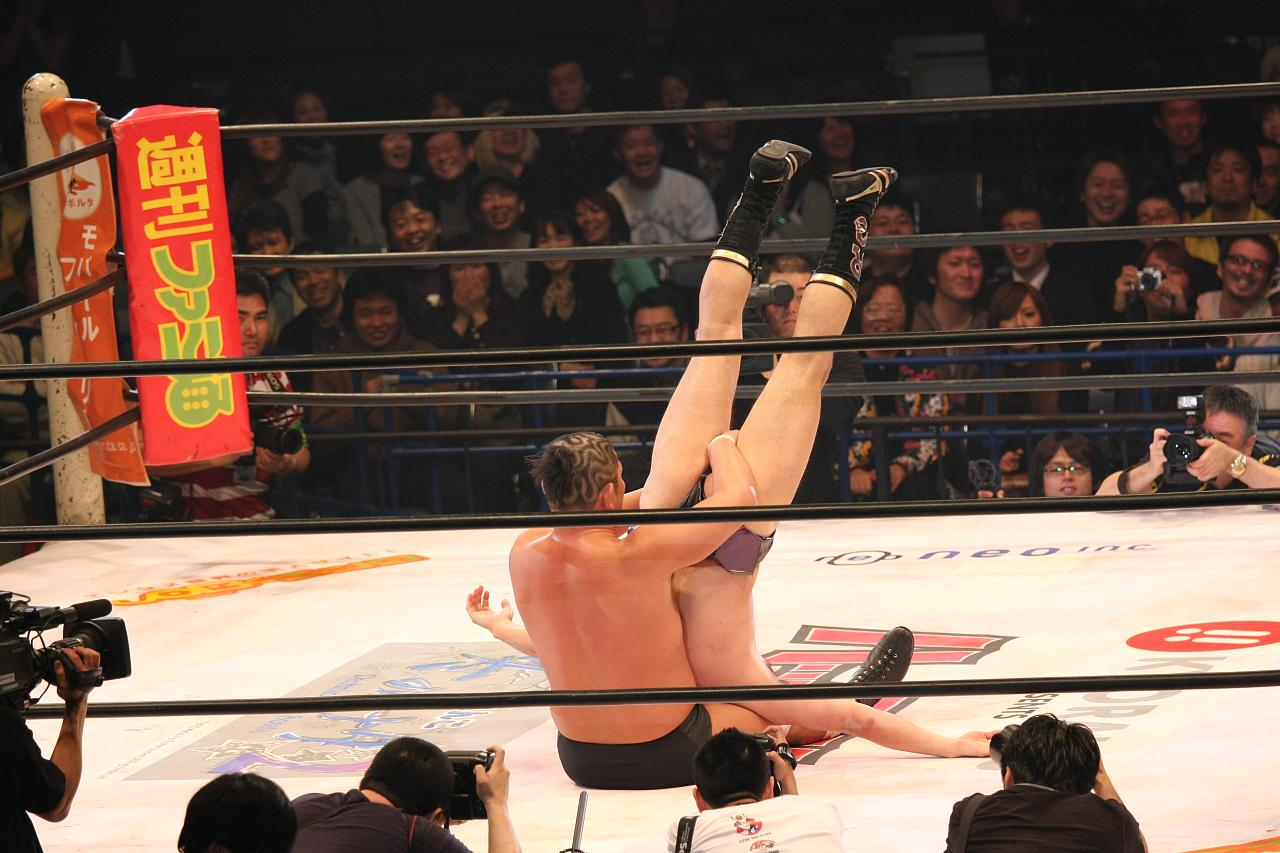
Minoru Suzuki performs the cradle piledriver.

The cradle piledriver is a variation of standard piledrivers which sees the attacking wrestler grapevine the opponent's leg with their arm. The most common form is similar to a Texas piledriver. This move sees the attacking wrestler, from a position in which the opponent is bent forward against the wrestler's midsection, reach around the opponent's midsection and lifting them so that they are held upside down facing in the same direction as the wrestler, the wrestler then hooks their arms around one leg of the opponent before dropping to a sitting or kneeling position with the opponent's head falling between the wrestler's thighs down to the mat. It was invented by Karl Gotch, known as the Gotch-Style Piledriver. It is commonly used by NJPW wrestler Minoru Suzuki (Gotch's protege) and AEW wrestler Jon Moxley. It was once used by Jerry Lynn, and Deonna Purrazzo also uses this move, known as the Queen's Gambit.

This variant can be used on other types of piledrivers, including the cradle tombstone piledriver variation: instead of wrapping both of their arms around the opponent's waist, the wrestler wraps one arm around the waist and places their other arm between the opponent's legs, grabbing hold of their other arm. The wrestler then drops down on their knees, driving the opponent down to the mat head-first. This Variation is used by Hiroyoshi Tenzan as the Original TTD (Original Tenzan Tombstone Driver) and he also uses a Sitout Variation called the TTD (Tenzan Tombstone Driver). Kenny Omega also used the move as Signature Maneuver.

=== Cross-arm piledriver ===
From a position in which the opponent is bent forward against the wrestler's midsection, the attacking wrestler crosses the arms of the opponent between their legs (a double pumphandle) before then lifting the opponent up into a vertical position and driving them down between the attacking wrestler's legs. It is used by SHO as the Shock Arrow.

=== Double-underhook piledriver ===
Also known as butterfly piledriver and the Tiger Driver '98. In this piledriver, a wrestler will bend their opponent forward, placing the opponent's head between the wrestler's legs, and hooks each of the opponent's arms behind the opponent's back. They then pull back on the opponent's arms lifting them up so that the opponent is held upside down facing in the same direction as the wrestler, the wrestler then drops to a sitting or kneeling position dropping the opponent's head into the mat. The namesake of the move is a tribute to Mitsuharu Misawa, as it's a hybrid of a Tiger Driver and the Tiger Driver '91 (Misawa's innovated and seldom used big match finisher; a double underhook into a kneeling-release neck-first powerbomb). The Tiger Driver '98 was used by ROH legend Jay Briscoe as the Jay-Driller, and is used by former TNA wrestler Josh Alexander as the C4 Spike; and current TNA wrestlers such as Eddie Edwards as one of his signature moves, while Sami Callihan uses this move as the Cactus Driver 97 as a tribute to Mick Foley's "Cactus Jack" persona. AEW commentator Excalibur previously used this in his wrestling career. In a kneeling position, this move was innovated by Jaguar Yokota.

==== Double-underhook back-to-back piledriver ====
Cheerleader Melissa performing her Kudo Driver (back-to-back double underhook piledriver) finisher on Wesna

Also known as the vertebreaker and the Kudo Driver, this move is executed from a position in which the opponent is standing behind the wrestler, the wrestler underhooks their arms under the opponent's arms. Then the wrestler twists their body around so that the wrestler is facing the ground and the opponent is standing with their back resting against the wrestler's back. Then the wrestler stands while the opponent is in an upside down position while both the opponent and the wrestler's arms are still hooked. The wrestler then drops to a sitting position. Another way to get the opponent into the position is to approach a standing opponent from behind, hook the opponent's arms, bend forward under the opponent, and then rise up, raising the opponent upside down. The move was invented by Megumi Kudo, dubbing it the Kudome Valentine, and is used by various wrestlers such as Homicide, Cheerleader Melissa, Shane Helms, Ryusuke Taguchi and Cody Rhodes.

This technique is extremely dangerous, possibly one of the most dangerous maneuvers in professional wrestling, as the opponent's arms are restrained and their head is not placed between the wrestler's legs, giving them little to post against. It was banned by WWE in April 2003, except for in cases in which the wrestler received special permission to use the move.

=== Flip piledriver ===
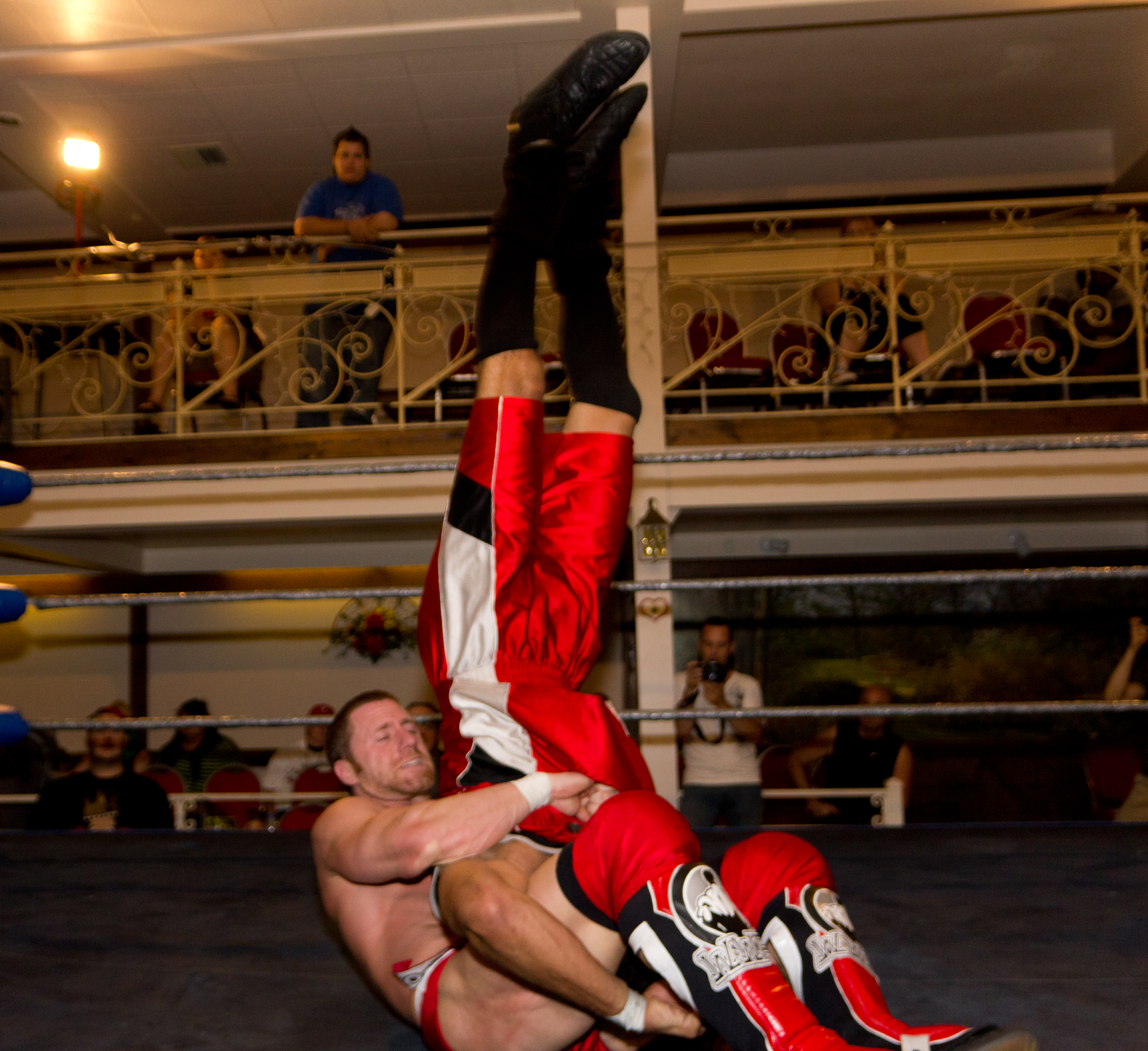
Petey Williams performing the Canadian Destroyer on Brent B

Animation of a flip piledriver

The move, made famous by Petey Williams, also referred to as the Canadian Destroyer, Destroyer, or a sunset flip piledriver, begins in a position in which the opponent is bent forward against the wrestler's midsection. The wrestler then grabs around the opponent's midsection latching onto the opponent's back, with their head to one side of the opponent's hips or between their legs, keeping their legs around the opponent's head. From this position the wrestler pushes off the mat with their legs to flip the opponent over. As both wrestlers flip, the attacking wrestler uses their body weight to land in a seated position driving the opponent's head down to the mat between the wrestler's thighs. Rey Mysterio occasionally uses the move, Bad Bunny used this move during WrestleMania 37 and at Backlash (2023), which was coined by commentators as the Boricua Destroyer. Penta also uses this move as the Mexican Destroyer. A double underhook variation exists in which the arms of a bent over opponent are placed in a butterfly prior to performing the flip. There is a diving variation from the second rope, Adam Cole uses this move calling it the Panama Sunrise.

According to Petey Williams, the move was suggested to him in 2003 while travelling to an IWA Mid-South show along with Chris Sabin and Truth Martini. Williams and Sabin originally planned to use the move in their match together but decided against it. The next month, Williams debuted the move in a match against Matt Sydal. It was not until 2004, when he debuted for TNA, when he learned that TNA star Amazing Red had performed the move since the 1990s.

=== Jumping piledriver ===
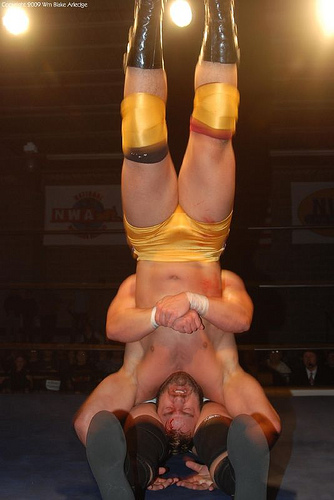
Adam Pearce performs the spike piledriver.

Also known as a spike piledriver or stiff piledriver and is performed in the same way as a basic piledriver, however the wrestler will jump in the air before dropping down to the sitting position for more impact. This move was used as the finisher of WWE Hall of Famer Paul Orndorff.

=== Package piledriver ===
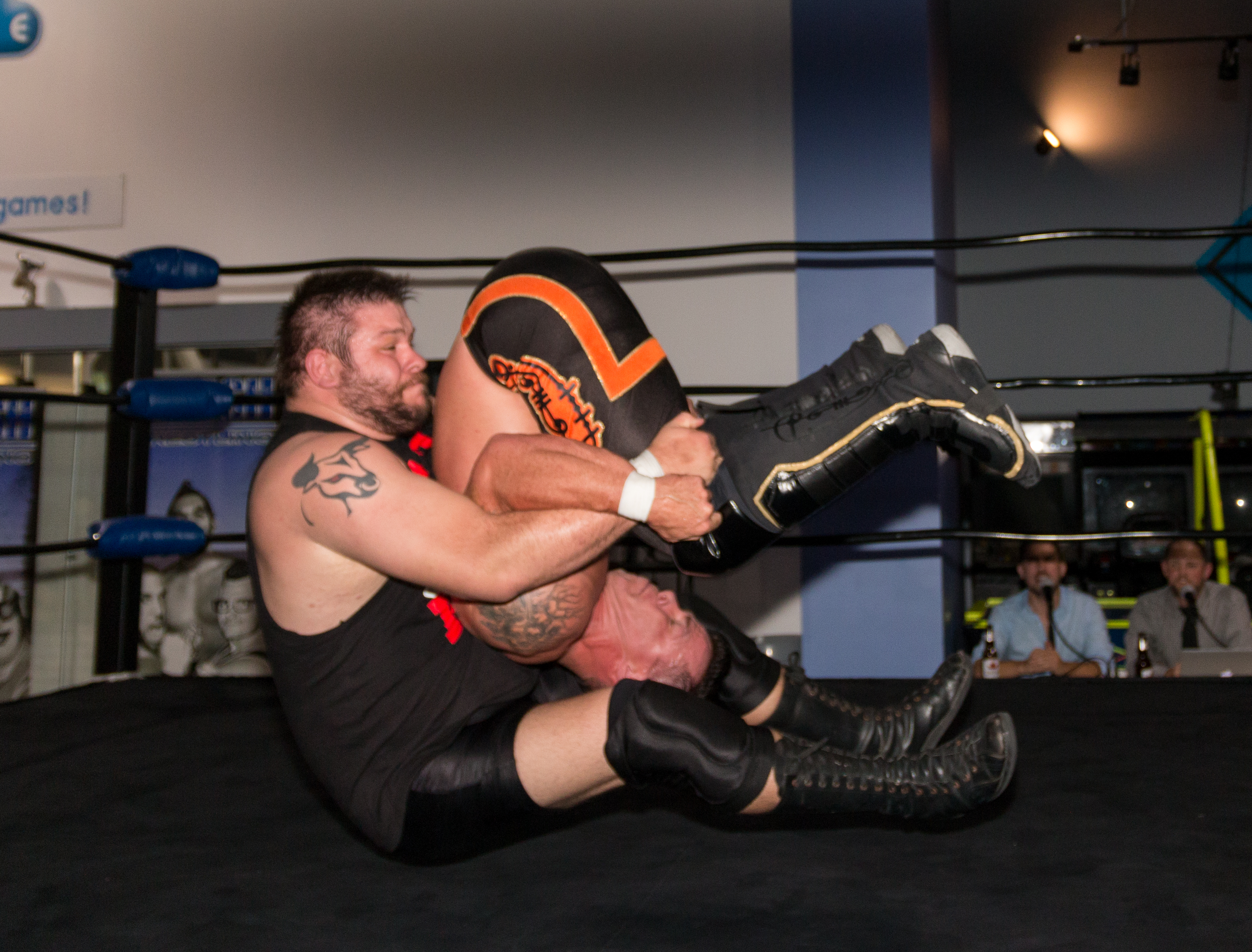
Kevin Steen executing his package piledriver finisher on Tyson Dux

A package piledriver is almost the same as a basic belly-to-back piledriver, but instead of grabbing the waist of the opponent, the wrestler puts their arms underneath the opponent's arms and grabs their legs by the knees. The wrestler then stands up, lifting the opponent until they are upside down, and drops to a sitting position with the opponent's head between their thighs. A version of this move also exist that can be performed without underhooking the arms of the opponent.

There is also an inverted version of the move in which an attacking wrestler reaches between an opponent's legs with one arm and reaches around that opponent's back from the same side with their other arm before lifting their opponent upside down into a belly-to-belly position. The attacker then grabs the opponent's legs by the knees, jumps up, then drops to a sitting position with the opponent's head between their thighs. Aja Kong innovated the move. This move was popularized by Kevin Steen during his time on the independent circuit. It is used by Chase Owens as Package Driver. Another notable user is Shane Taylor. Pentagón Jr. uses the package piledriver as the Fear Factor.

=== Pulling piledriver ===
Also known as a stump piledriver and Cactus Driver (after Cactus Jack, one of Mick Foley's alter egos), this is a variation of piledriver where, instead of wrapping their arms around the opponent's waist, a wrestler grabs onto the back of the waistband of an opponent's tights to lift them upside down before dropping into a sitting position. Mick Foley was famous for have used this move which he called the Stump Puller.

=== Reverse piledriver ===
Also known as a belly-to-belly piledriver, a wrestler faces an opponent and grabs the opponent's waist and turns them upside-down, holding them belly-to-belly against their torso. The wrestler then jumps up and drops down to a sitting position, driving the opponent's head down to the mat between the wrestler's thighs. This move was best remembered as being used by Owen Hart as a finisher.

The wrestler may also place the opponent over their shoulder and fall to a seated position, driving the opponent's head to the mat between their thighs. This move is often known by the name Fire Thunder, or Fire Thunder Driver as named by Mr. Gannosuke. Bam Bam Bigelow and Rikishi used this move as a signature move, calling it the Greetings from Asbury Park and the Rikishi Driver respectively. WALTER/Gunther has used this move mainly on the independent circuit. Former AEW wrestler Rey Fénix also uses this move as a finisher calling it the Fénix Driver/Fire Driver/Fire Thunder Driver which sees him sometimes transition into the move from a reverse suplex lift or fireman's carry. Havok of TNA uses this move which was later dubbed the Sick Driver when portraying her Jessicka character.

==== Kneeling reverse piledriver ====
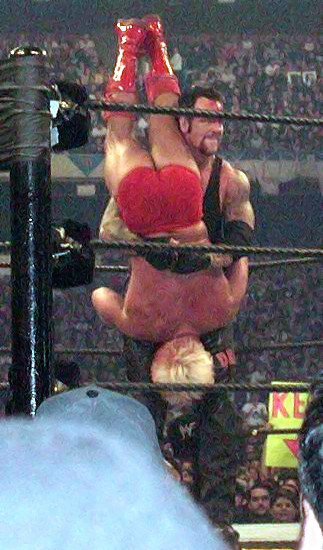
The Undertaker performs the Tombstone Piledriver (a.k.a. reverse kneeling piledriver) on Ric Flair.

The wrestler first stands facing an opponent and places their stronger arm between the opponent's legs and their weaker arm on the opponent's opposite shoulder. The wrestler then lifts the opponent onto their stronger shoulder, turning them upside-down, similar to a scoop slam lift. The opponent is then lowered while being held so that the opponent's head is hanging between the standing wrestler's knees. The wrestler then falls or jumps to their knees, driving the opponent's head into the mat. The move was innovated by Karl Gotch, but the move was first utilized by Andre The Giant in the 1970s, before it was popularized by The Undertaker and was later used by his (kayfabe) brother Kane. However, contrary to the popular belief, the name tombstone predates Undertaker's debut and has been used since at least 1972. Other famous practitioners include Dynamite Kid, Satoru Sayama, Don Muraco, Matt Riddle (during his independent circuit wrestling), Owen Hart, and Kazuchika Okada. An Over the shoulder version of this move (in which both the opponent's knees rest on one of the attacker's shoulder) also exists and was used by The Undertaker early in his WWE career. Masakatsu Funaki uses a variation of the move, known as the Hybrid Blaster, where he places one of the opponent's arms in a hammerlock before delivering the piledriver. Kyle Fletcher also uses that hammerlock variant called Grimstone, and Harley Cameron uses a t-bone spinning double hammerlock variant called Blackstone Piledriver. Kris Statlander, Kota Ibushi, Konosuke Takeshita, "Hangman" Adam Page, Mariah May and Xia Brookside also use a cradle variant.

==== Pumphandle reverse piledriver ====
This variation sees an attacking wrestler first lock an opponent in the pumphandle hold before then using the hold to raise the opponent up over the shoulder of the attacking wrestler. From here the attacking wrestler brings the opponent down into the belly-to-belly position before then sitting down for a reverse piledriver with the opponent's head impacting the mat between the legs of the attacking wrestler. CM Punk used this during the indies as the Punk-Handle Piledriver.

=== Rope-assisted piledriver ===
This version sees an attacking wrestler place the opponent on an elevated surface, usually the ropes/turnbuckle/ring apron, while the opponent is bent forward against the wrestler's midsection. The attacking wrestler next draws the opponent away from the elevated surface leaving the opponent's waist over the elevated surface (i.e. ring ropes), making them the only thing other than the wrestler keeping the opponent off the ground. The attacking wrestler then grabs the top rope while pushing off the mat with their legs simultaneously like a see-saw so that the opponent is forced to dive forward onto his/her head with extra force due to the height of which they were dropped. Innovated by Independent Wrestler, Rocky Rage, as The Ebola Driver in 2014. Popularized by MJF as the Heat Seeker.

=== Scoop side piledriver ===
Facing the opponent, the wrestler reaches between the opponent's legs with their right arm and reaches around the opponent's neck from the same side with their left arm. They then lift the opponent up on their chest so that they are facing downwards. The wrestler then moves their left arm from around the opponent's neck to around the opponent's torso. They then turn the opponent so that they are upside down on one side of the wrestler. The wrestler then jumps up and falls down to a sitting position, driving the opponent down to the mat neck and shoulder first. The move was popularized by Hayabusa, who called it H Thunder, and by Mitsuharu Misawa, who called it the Emerald Flowsion.

=== Scoop slam piledriver ===
Facing their opponent, the wrestler reaches between the opponent's legs with their right arm and reaches around the opponent's neck from the same side with their left arm. They then lift the opponent up and turn them around so that they are held upside down, as in a scoop slam. The wrestler then drops down to their knees, driving the opponent down to the mat neck and shoulder first. There is also a seated version of this move. It was innovated by Taka Michinoku and used by Tennile Dashwood, Nick Aldis, and more.

=== Vertical suplex piledriver ===
The wrestler applies a front facelock to the opponent and hooks the opponent's near arm over their shoulder and lifts them into a vertical suplex position. They then turn the opponent 180°, force the opponent into the reverse piledriver position, then drop to a sitting position, dropping the opponent on their head. This move was first used by Jushin Thunder Liger on Ultimo Dragon, then the move became popular through use by Scott Steiner, who called it the Steiner Screwdriver. AEW wrestler Brian Cage currently uses the move as the Drill Claw. Tomohiro Ishii briefly used the move in 2013 as the Ishii Driller. Naomichi Marufuji invented a fisherman suplex variation called Pole Shift.

=== Wheelbarrow piledriver ===
Similar to the wheelbarrow facebuster but instead of dropping their opponent face first, they drop their opponent so that the opponent lands on their upper back and neck between the legs of the wrestler, facing towards them usually resulting in a pin.

== See also ==
- Professional wrestling throws
