= Pinch grip tie =

Grappling position

- A wrestler with a pinch grip tie
- Classification: Clinch hold
- Style: Wrestling
- AKA: Head and arm

A pinch grip tie, or an over-under bodylock, is a clinch hold and stand-up grappling position that is an extension of the over-under position, but having both hands locked behind the opponents back. The hands are typically locked with a palm-to-palm grip, palm-to-wrist grip or fingers-to-fingers grip. The pinch grip tie can be used to throw the opponent, but usually the grapplers attempt to obtain a better hold such as double underhooks or double collar tie. The pinch grip tie is often a neutral position when both grapplers symmetrically have the same hold on each other.

Scottish backhold is a type of folk wrestling built entirely around this position, where the goal is to either break the opponent's grip or take them down.

== See also ==
- Bear hug
- Collar-and-elbow position
- Double collar tie
- Double underhooks
