= Bear hug =

In wrestling, a hold and position

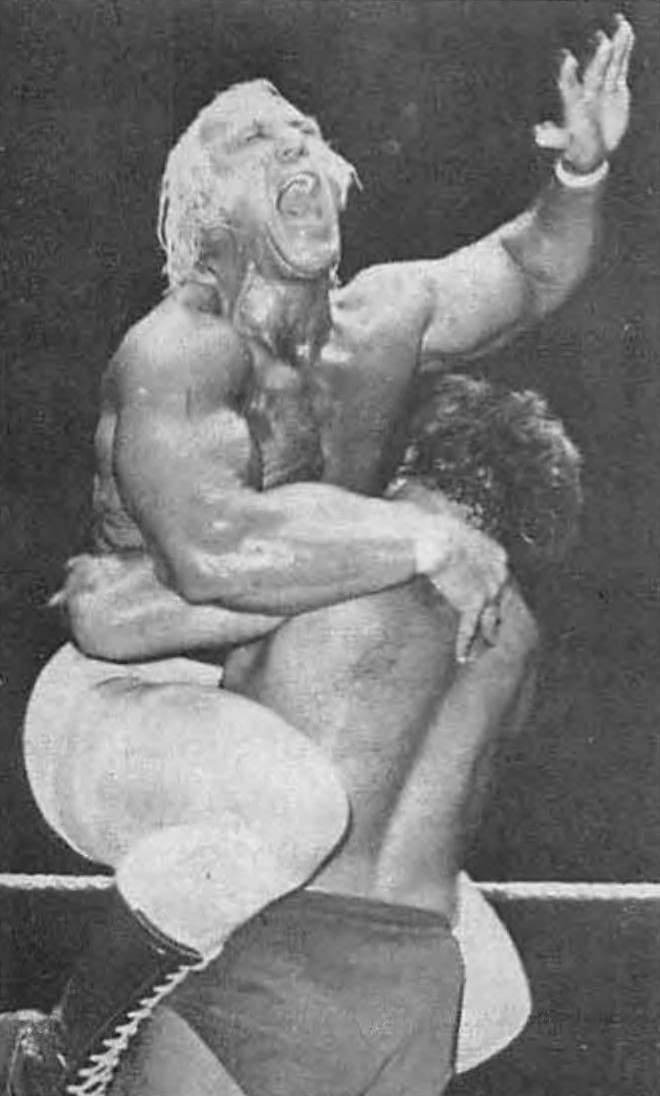
- Bruno Sammartino holds "Superstar" Billy Graham in a bear hug (1977)
- Classification: Clinch hold
- Style: Wrestling
- AKA: Bodylock

The bear hug is a grappling maneuver often seen in sports, such as wrestling. It also exists outside sports, such as street fighting, martial arts personal defense, military hand-to-hand combat, and even affectionate hugging. Bear hugs can be dangerous or even deadly when done with maximum force, and so they are rare in sports, although the simulacrum of a full-force bear hug is common in professional wrestling.

== Sports ==
In the sport of wrestling, a bear hug is a grappling clinch hold and stand-up grappling position where the arms are wrapped around the opponent, either around the opponent's chest, midsection, or thighs, sometimes with one or both of the opponent's arms pinned to the opponent's body. The hands are locked around the opponent and the opponent is held tightly to the chest. The bear hug is a dominant position, with great control over the opponent, and also allows an easy takedown to the back mount position.

The bear hug is a classic submission move not widely seen anymore, when done for real with maximum effort. Traditionally the hugger would apply the move and wait for the huggee to submit, or pass out. The ref would occasionally check the limpness of the huggee's arms before calling the match. The move was dangerous. The huggee can lose the ability to breathe long enough to cause injury or death. A strong enough hugger can break the huggee's lower rib cage, puncturing vital organs.

In the 1960s and 70s, the bear hug was the signature closing move of Bruno Sammartino who remained undefeated as World Heavyweight Championship for over 10 years. In the 1977 title match against "Superstar" Billy Graham, in front a live audience, Superstar slowly stripped Sammartino's arms from around his waist, the first time anyone had seen it done.

A variation of the bear hug is the inverted bear hug, in which one wrestler spins the other upside down with head towards the floor and feet towards the ceiling, holding them in the middle as in a regular bear hug. It was a trademark closing move of Canadian strongman Doug Hepburn during the 1950s.

== Non-sport ==
Outside the context of sports, bear hugging varies in reason and execution, defined by the sources who call it a bear hug. Examples include street fighting self-defense, military hand to hand combat, martial arts personal defense, and affectionate hugging.

== See also ==
- Bear Hugger, a Super Punch-Out!! character
- Collar-and-elbow position
- Double collar tie
- Double underhooks
- Over–under position
- Pinch grip tie
