= Underhook =

Wrestling hold

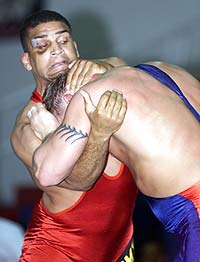
- The wrestler in red has an underhook, while the blue wrestler attempts to reverse
- Classification: Clinch hold
- Style: Wrestling

An underhook is a clinch hold that is used in grappling to control the opponent. It is performed from any direction by putting an arm under the opponent's arm, and holding the opponent's midsection or upper body. Having an underhook with one arm is called a single underhook, while having underhooks with both arms is known as double underhooks. The typical response to an underhook is to try to break it, or to establish an overhook.

== Single underhook ==
A single underhook can be used as a takedown maneuver. The protagonist underhooks one arm of the opponent and extends his underhooking arm partly or mostly across the opponent's back, while using his other hand to pull the opponent's other elbow across the opponent's body, and drives forward into the underhooked side of the opponent.

== Double underhooks ==
The double underhooks are considered one of the most dominant positions in the clinch, primarily because they allow for great control of the opponent, and can be used for doing a takedown or throwing the opponent. The double underhooks can be used to advance into a bear hug by locking the hands behind the back, and holding the opponent close to the chest. The opponent typically responds to double underhooks with double overhooks, to prevent the opponent from advancing into the bear hug.

== See also ==
- Bear hug
- Collar-and-elbow position
- Double collar tie
- Pinch grip tie
- Overhook
- Over-under position
