= Grappling position =

Wrestling term

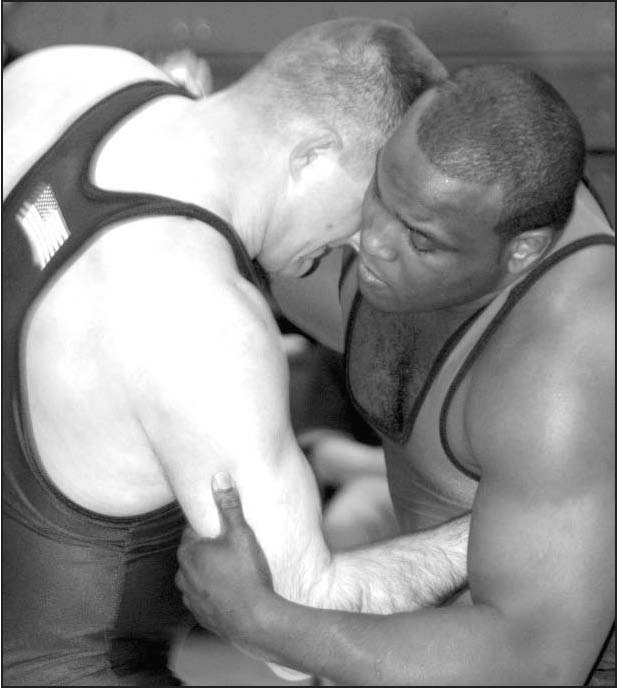
- Two wrestlers in a clinch, using over- and underhooks

A grappling position refers to the positioning and holds of combatants engaged in grappling. Combatants are said to be in a neutral position if neither is in a more favourable position. If one party has a clear advantage such as in the mount they are said to be in a "dominant position". Conversely, the other party is considered to be in an inferior position, usually called "on the bottom", but in this case sometimes called the "under mount".

== Stand-up grappling position ==
Called clinch position or standing grappling position, these are the core of clinch fighting. From a separated stand-up position, a clinch is the result of one or both fighters applying a clinch hold. The process of attempting to advance into more dominant clinch positions is known as pummelling.

Major types of standing clinches include:

- Bear hug
- Collar-and-elbow position
- Double collar tie
- Double underhooks
- Pinch grip tie
- Clinch hold

Fighters may attempt to break from the clinch, either as the rule requires it as in boxing or because they wish to obtain a better position by moving out and re-engaging, If the clinch continues, fighters may attempt to strike, takedown or throw an opponent. This may result in a win, or the start of ground grappling.

== Ground grappling position ==
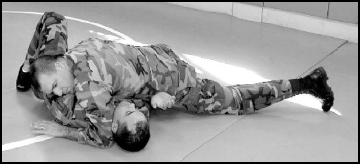
Side control as shown in a combatives manual.

Positioning is the foundation of ground fighting, if one combatant is controlling an opponent from a top position, such as if they are pinning the opponent to the ground, then that combatant is said to have the top position, while their opponent is said to have the bottom position. Top positions are usually dominant as fighters can use their weight to their advantage, but depending on the set of rules used, it can have notable exceptions such as the guard. A dominant ground position is usually easier to obtain for the person who initiated the throw or takedown. It may be possible for a fighter in a dominant position to score points or win by pinning their opponent, applying a submission hold or striking.

There is a rough hierarchy of major ground grappling positions from the most advantageous to the least for the "top" fighter:

1. Rear mount
2. Mount
3. Knee-on-stomach
4. Side control
5. North-south position
6. Turtle
7. Half guard
8. Disengaged*
9. Guard

*Fighters are disengaged if neither has a grip on the other they can use to restrict their movement

A reversal from a dominant or top position is called a sweep; these are usually the aim of a fighter in the bottom position, though there are some submissions that can be executed from the bottom, most commonly from the guard. While a position may be considered dominant in one sport, that may not be the case in another: for example, the closed guard in BJJ may be dominant in terms of submission; in mixed martial arts (MMA), however, where striking is allowed, while the guard still offers submission opportunities and defence, the fighter on top can strike better than the one on the bottom so the position is usually viewed as neutral in MMA and Budo Moussaraa MMA. Wrestling is different again, viewing the guard as inferior due to the risk of being pinned.

== Examples ==
- In an amateur wrestling match, the wrestlers are standing in a symmetrical position, with both wrestlers having a pinch grip tie on the other wrestler. The wrestlers are in a neutral position. Wrestler 'A' then pummels through to gain double underhooks so gaining a dominant position.
- In a Brazilian jiu-jitsu match, grappler 'C' is holding the other grappler 'D' in an open guard. The open guard allows grappler 'C' to attempt a multitude of submission holds, while grappler 'D's priority is to advance in position; grappler 'C' is in a dominant position while the top grappler is in an inferior position, as it is hard for 'D' to attack before they improve their position. 'D' then used a near knee guard pass getting one leg though to gain a half guard, a more dominant position where they can attack 'C' and 'C' will find submitting them more difficult
- In a mixed martial arts bout, fighter 'E' has a strong closed guard and is using it to help defend against punches; fighter 'F' cannot strike with full effect, but is unlikely to be struck effectively or submitted quickly so they are in a relatively neutral position; fighter 'F' is then swept and mounted by fighter 'E' giving them a dominant position.
- In Muay Thai, the stand-up clinch is effectively utilized. However, its grappling attacks are limited to sweeps, as the clinch is mainly used for setting up uppercuts and strikes from the knees and elbows. The primary clinch in this art is known as the Thai Plum or the Collar Tie.

== See also ==
- Grappling
- Grappling hold
- Ground fighting
