= Collar tie =

Grappling clinch hold

- The wrestler on the left has a collar tie.
- Classification: Clinch hold
- Style: Wrestling

Collar tie is a grappling clinch hold that is used to control the opponent. It is performed from the front of the opponent by grabbing the opponent by the collar, behind the neck, or behind the trapezius muscle. A collar tie using one hand is called a single collar tie, and a collar tie with both hands is called a double collar tie.

== See also ==
- Clinch fighting
