= Pin (professional wrestling) =

Professional wrestling term

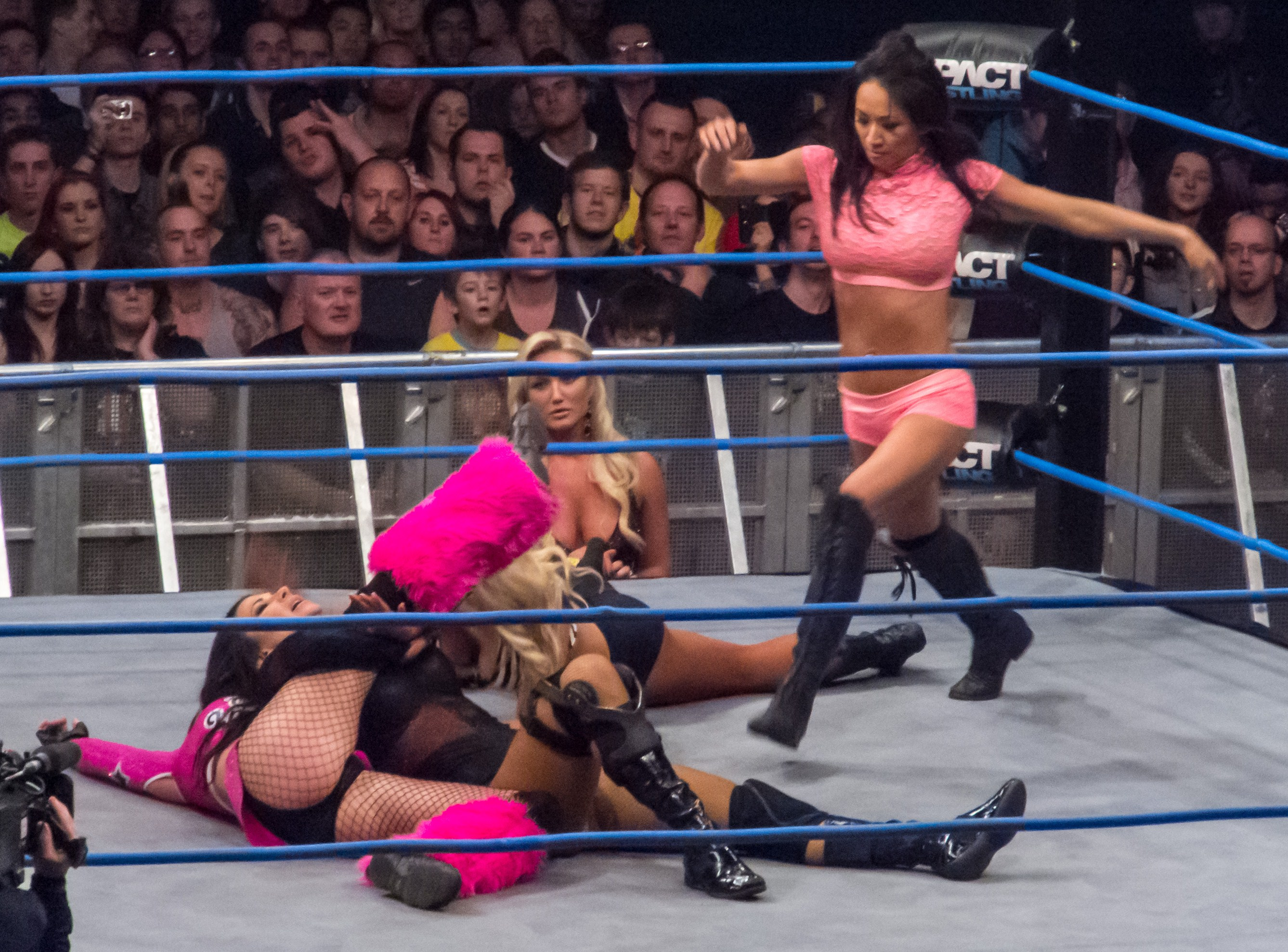
Tara pins Velvet Sky with a cover while Gail Kim attempts to break up the pin.

In professional wrestling, a pin is a move where a wrestler holds an opponent's shoulders to the mat in an attempt to score a fall. A pinfall is a common victory condition, where the attacker pins an opponent and the referee makes a three count before the opponent gets released from the pin.

== Background ==
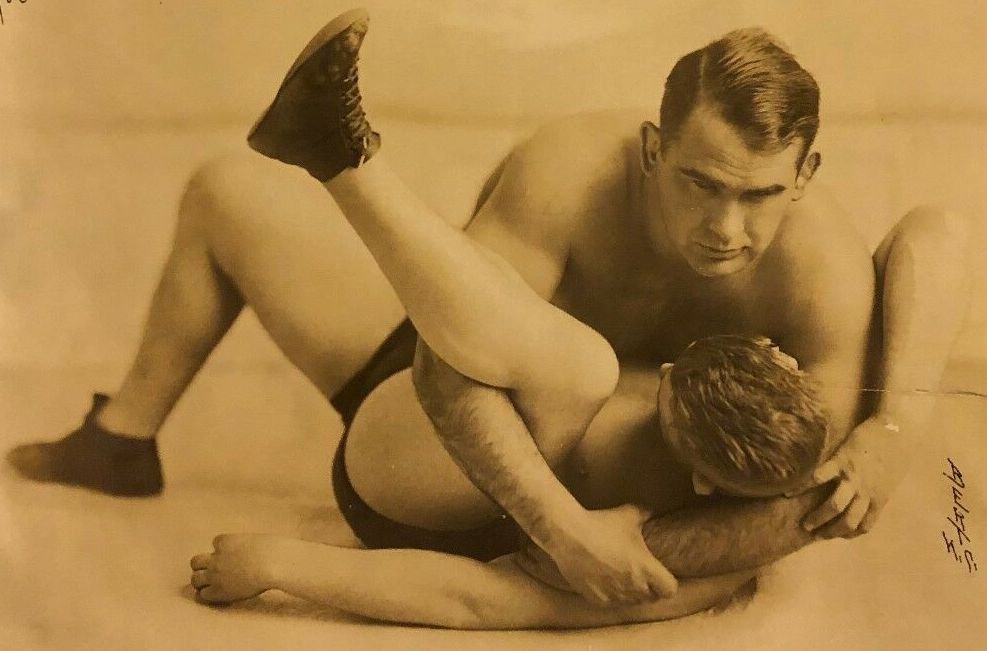
Ed "Strangler" Lewis pins an opponent in 1929

The origin of the pinfall is the pin from amateur wrestling, whereby pinning an opponent to the mat will result in an automatic victory despite any points scored. However, while an amateur wrestling pin need be only one or two seconds, the count in professional wrestling is based on the referee's arm gestures, regardless of how much actual time elapses, and is to three slaps of the mat.

The count is broken (usually by a near-fall) if the opponent manages to raise one or both of their shoulders off the mat, commonly by kicking out (throwing their legs up to cause their shoulders to rise from the mat). In some positions, a wrestler may bridge (arching their back so that only their feet and the top of their head are touching the ground) to put more of their weight on the pinned opponent or to prop themselves up from being pinned.

Sometimes, an attacking wrestler may hook the opponent's tights for extra leverage. Another popular illegal tactic of heel wrestlers is to attempt a pin close to the ring ropes so they can prop their legs (or on rare occasions, arms) up on the ropes to gain additional leverage, putting more weight on the opponent. On the other hand, a pinfall attempt cannot occur in the first place when one rolls out of the ring if falls do not count anywhere, or if the opponent lies on their stomach upon impact, so it would take extra effort to roll the opponent over, even when they are knocked out cold, due to the body being effectively a dead weight.

If a wrestler's shoulders are flat on the mat, even while locked in a submission hold like a figure-four leglock, it can legally be counted as a pinfall. This rule exists solely because pinfalls and submissions are separate win conditions, and the referee must call a pin whenever both shoulders are down for a three-count, regardless of the situation. Even if a wrestler is applying or enduring a submission hold, the referee's job is to check shoulders first. If they're down, the match can end by pinfall before a tap-out occurs. Wrestlers applying submissions on the mat (like triangle chokes or armbars) sometimes unintentionally put their own shoulders down, risking being pinned while trying to force a tap. Some promotions use this rule to add drama—forcing wrestlers to balance between maintaining a painful hold and protecting themselves from being pinned.

== Pinning techniques ==
=== Backslide ===
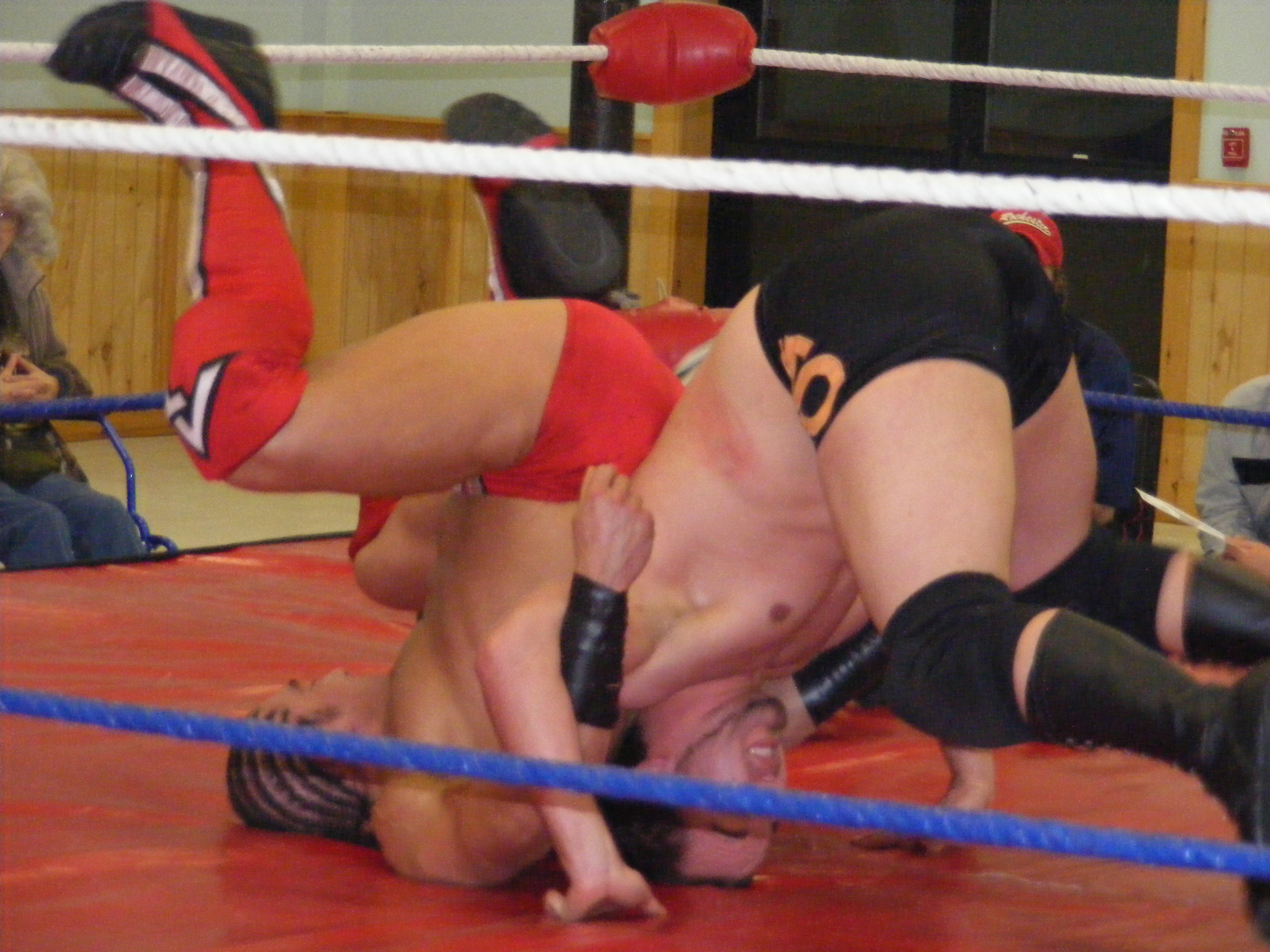
A backslide pin

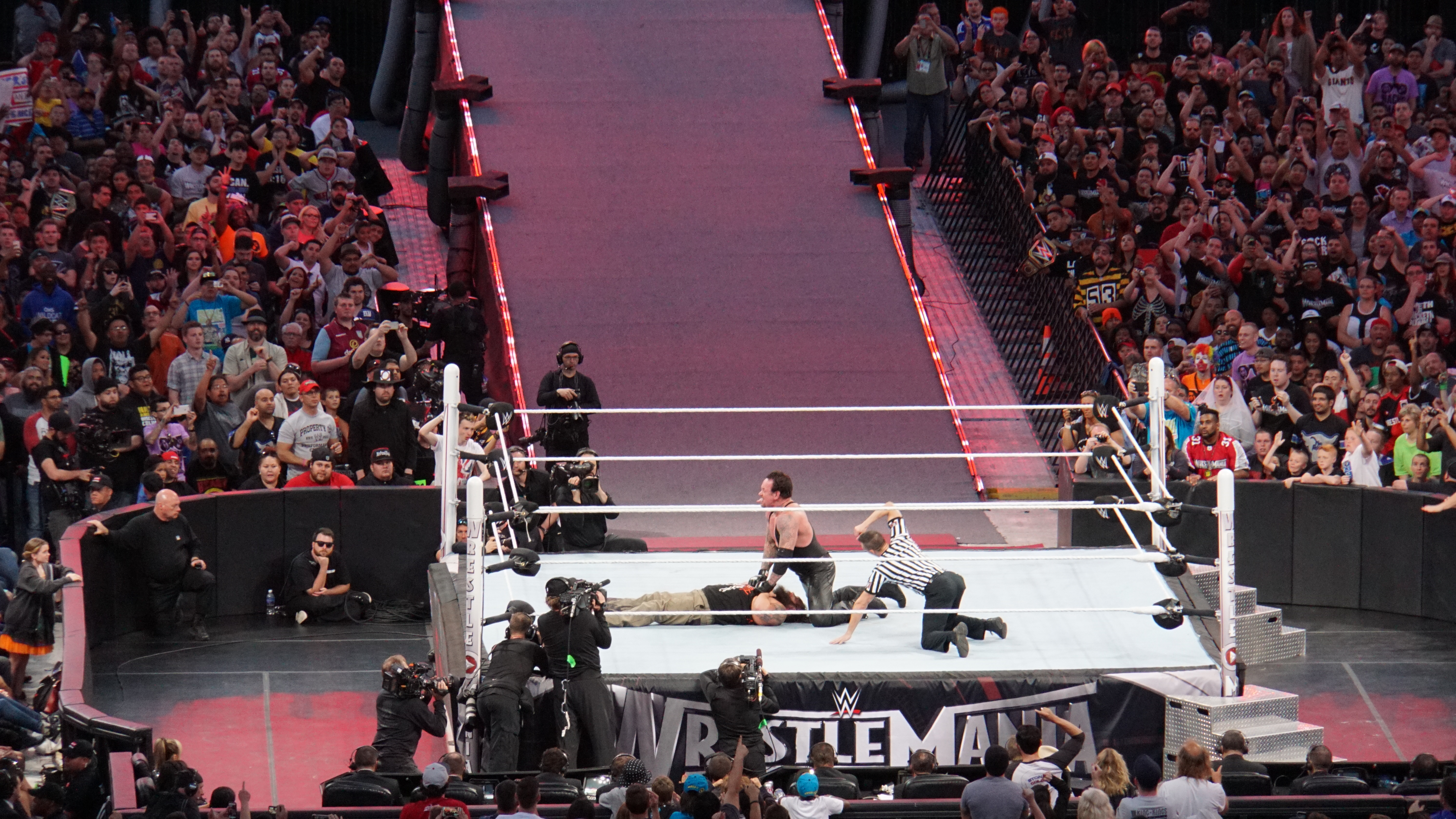
The Undertaker pinning Bray Wyatt with his signature variation pinfall crossing the opponent's arms across their chest after his finishing move, the Tombstone Piledriver, also called the "Rest In Peace" pin.

The attacking wrestler stands back-to-back with their opponent and hooks both of the opponent's arms. They then lean forward and drop to their knees, sliding the opponent down their back so that their shoulders are against the mat and their chin is against their chest. The attacker holds the opponent's arms down with their own arms for the pin. Jack Evans uses a bridging variation of this pin as one of his finishers called the Kamikaze Damashi.

=== Cover ===
Also known as a lateral press, cross press, or simply as the basic pin. With an opponent lying face-up on the mat, the attacking wrestler lies face-down across the opponent's chest to hold them down. Sometimes, when both wrestlers are exhausted or badly hurt the attacking wrestler will cover with just an arm or lie down face up rather than face down. The term floatover (when in reference to a pin) refers to an attacking wrestler using the momentum of a throw or slam they are performing to propel themselves over the opponent into the lateral press position. A variation commonly used by The Undertaker sees the wrestler get on their knees behind the opponent's head and cross the opponent's arms across their chest, similar to a corpse. This is sometimes called a "Rest In Peace" pin, though there is no official name. Another variation that was used by Kane includes the wrestler also getting on their knees behind the opponent's head and bringing the opponent's arms out and usually holding them down by the wrists, forming the opponent's body in a cross shape. This pin does not have an official name either. If multiple people are stacked, the wrestler who is on top secures the cover for all wrestlers beneath them.

=== Cradle ===
The attacking wrestler lies across the opponent's chest and hooks a leg with the arm on the opposite side (left leg with right arm or right leg with left arm). Holding the leg gives the attacker greater leverage and thus makes it harder for the opponent to kick out. Not to be confused with the inside cradle.

=== Crucifix ===
An attacking wrestler hooks the arms of an opponent by grapevining their legs around one arm and their arms around the other. This positions the attacking wrestler horizontally across the back of the opponent and forces the opponent's arms out like a crucifixion. The attacking wrestler then lowers their bodyweight so that the opponent is brought down to the mat backwards and is forced onto their own shoulders in a pinning position, with their legs in the air.

A variation on the standard crucifix, the crucifix bomb or crucifix driver, sees an attacking wrestler violently force their bodyweight downwards to throw the opponent into the mat with greater impact. Leon Ruff uses a rolling version of this move called "Ruff landing".

=== Delfin Clutch ===
The Delfin Clutch has an attacking wrestler crossing the arms of the opponent across their own chest while they're lying on their back on the mat. The attacking wrestler then kneels down on one knee on the opponent's arms, pinning the opponent's shoulders down to the mat. The attacking wrestler then grabs the opponent's legs, crosses them, and places them under one of their armpits, bending the opponent to a pinning predicament. Innovated by Super Delfin.

=== Gannosuke Clutch ===
The Gannosuke Clutch has an attacking wrestler facing the opponent, grabbing their arm, twisting it into a modified hammerlock and then performing a front somersault while holding the trapped arm in place as well as legsweeping the opponent's near leg, rolling the opponent backwards while the attacking wrestler keeps the hammerlock applied while also holding the opponent's near leg down with their own leg. This move is also known as an arm trap somersault cradle. This was innovated and popularized by Mr. Gannosuke, who named it after himself.

=== Gedo Clutch ===
The Gedo Clutch has an attacking wrestler sit kneeling on the back of an opponent who is lying face down and facing the same way. The attacking wrestler then grabs the opponent's arms and lifts them over their thighs, similar to a camel clutch. The attacker then grabs hold of the opponent's head and pushes it down and forward between their legs, while the wrestler leans forward onto their stomach, flipping the opponent over onto their shoulders, with the attacker's legs pinning the opponent down to the mat. This hold is technically known as a double leg nelson. It was innovated by Gedo and used by Taichi as Taichi-shiki Gedo Clutch.

=== Jackknife hold ===
The hold has the opponent wrestler lying on their back. Standing at the feet of the opponent, the attacking wrestler then lifts the opponent's legs from behind the knees. Still gripping the opponent's legs, the attacking wrestler then flips forward, over the opponent, and plants their feet on the mat while bridging the back to add leverage.

A variation of the jackknife hold, known as the figure four pin, has the attacker placing the opponent's legs in a figure four position before executing the bridge.

European Clutch

The hold is an Inverted Jacknife Pin that is used with a double pumphandle arm wringer. It is a pinning variation that is usually used after an iconoclasm. Zack Sabre Jr. uses it as his finisher.

=== La magistral ===
Also referred to as La Casita or a bandito, this move's technical name is arm-wrench inside cradle pin, and it is performed with the opponent on their hands and knees. From this position, the attacking wrestler stands next to the opponent's hip, grabs one arm, and applies an armbar. The attacking wrestler then steps over the arm with their inside leg so that they facing away from the opponent. The attacking wrestler continues the turning motion and dives forward over the opponent, rolling onto their side. The barred arm acts as a lever, flipping the opponent over the attacker and onto their back. The attacker hooks one or both legs as the opponent goes over and holds for the pin.

=== Mousetrap ===
A modified version of La Magistral, the attacking wrestler wrenches the opponent's arm to get behind the opponent. While holding the arm, the attacker steps through the opponent's inside leg and puts the wrenched arm between the attacker's and opponent's legs. The attacker falls forward, making the opponent flip onto their back and neck in a crucifix. This leaves the opponent's inside leg and both arm hooked in the pin. Orange Cassidy uses this as one of his finishers.

=== Oklahoma roll ===
Not to be confused with the O'Connor roll, which is a roll-up. The attacking wrestler stands to the side of the opponent, who is on their hands and knees. The attacker hooks one arm around the opponent's neck and one between the legs, and rolls over the opponent. The attacker lands on their back or side, and the opponent is flipped so that their shoulders are pressed against the mat.

=== Prawn hold ===
This pin is typically the result of a powerbomb. Similar to a rana, except that the attacking wrestler is standing, bent over the opponent with both legs hooked, pressing their weight down. The attacking wrestler can also either flip themselves into a bridging Jackknife hold, or perform a technique innovated by Toshiaki Kawada; sliding forward off their feet and balancing on the opponent's thighs with their full body weight.

The name was popularized by localisations of the Japanese video game series Fire Pro Wrestling, and is a literal translation of the Japanese term for the technique: ebi-gatame. So-called because the opponent's curled-up head-over-heels position resembles a deep-fried shrimp. Any other kind of pin that puts the opponent in that position can likewise technically be called a modified "prawn hold". Especially those that involve "rolling" through with the target, such as the hurricanrana, victory roll & O'Connor roll. In the original Japanese, kata (partial) ebi-gatame can also refer to the basic single-leg-hook pin, and gyaku (reverse) ebi-gatame refers to the Boston crab submission.

=== Rana ===
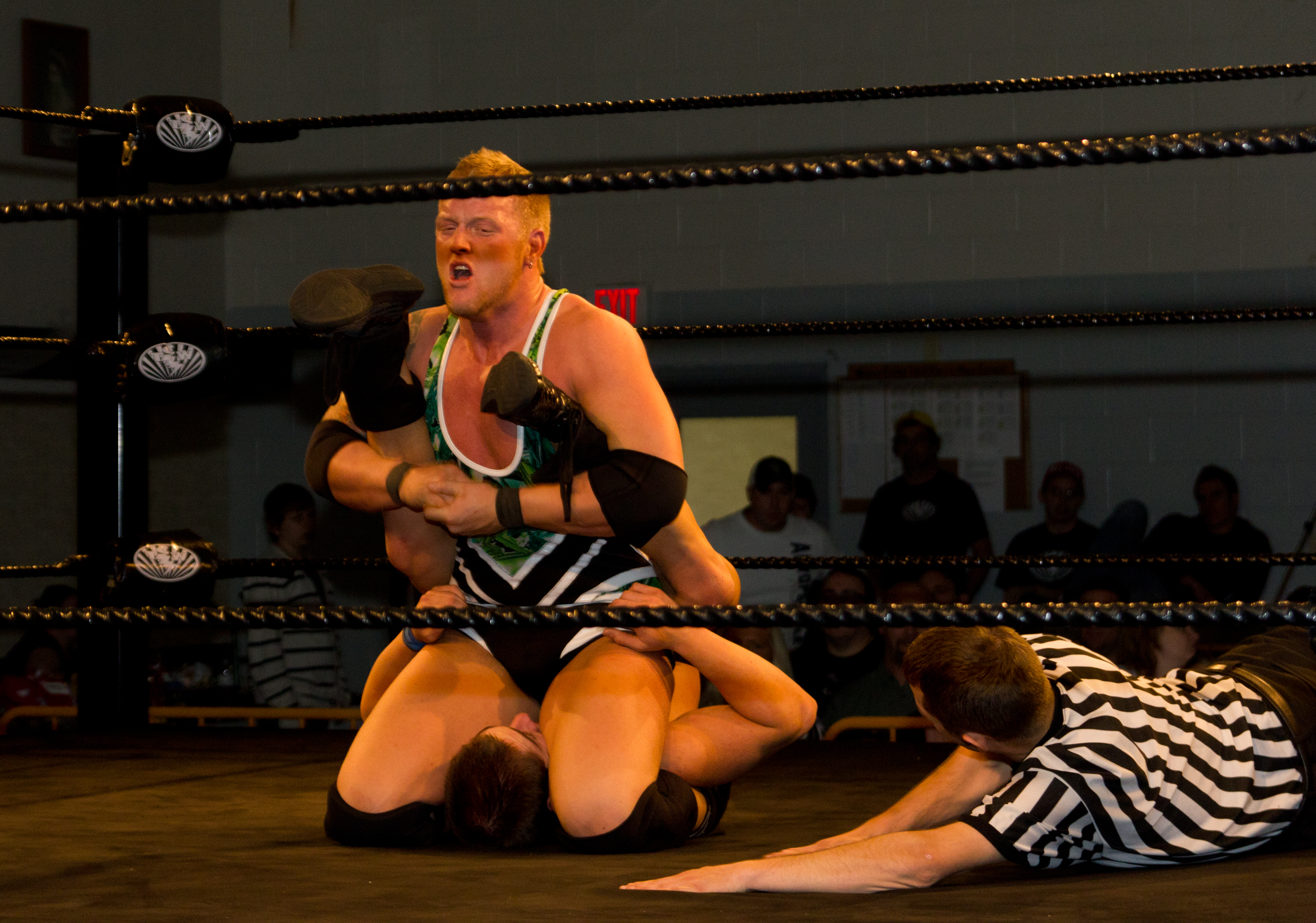
Implementation of a rana pin.

Also known as the double leg cradle (from the original Spanish rana, meaning "frog"), is the technical term for the pinning position which results from a sunset flip or a hurricanrana.

In the sunset flip version, the opponent is lying shoulders down on the mat, almost completely flat on their back, while the wrestler applying the pin sits below the legs of the opponent and uses their own legs to cover the opponent's shoulders or arms, then hooks both legs around the opponent's thighs to force their weight down to the mat.

The other variation, which usually results from a hurricanrana, sees the one performing the hurricanrana sit on the opponent's chest and hook the opponent's legs behind them while hooking the opponent's arms with their legs. This variation is the same hold, just with the attacking wrestler on top. This interchangeability often sees a spot where the wrestlers change their weight distribution to move from one pinning hold to the other for a succession of near falls. It is the pin after the West Coast Pop, used by Rey Mysterio.

=== Roll-up ===
Jordynne Grace performs a standing switch and then an O'Connor roll on her opponent, leading to a 2 count

Not to be confused with a schoolboy pin or a backslide pin. The attacking wrestler holds their opponent from behind in a waistlock. The attacking wrestler then performs a backward roll while holding the waistlock. The opponent ends up on their shoulders with the attacking wrestler sitting on top of their legs holding the opponent down. This move is often done when the opponent is leaning on the ropes facing out of the ring and the attacking wrestler would first push forward into the ropes with the waistlock in order to generate faster backward motion. A common heel tactic is to grab the back of the opponents clothing or tights while sitting on top of them or to use the ropes for leverage, thus making the pin illegal.

It is sometimes called the O'Connor roll, after Pat O'Connor's usage of the move; but O'Connor himself dubbed the move a "reverse rolling cradle". Bob Backlund also performed this move and additionally bridged over the opponent at the end of the move.

=== Schoolboy ===
Not to be confused with a roll-up. The schoolboy sweep sees the attacking wrestler drop down behind the opponent and put one arm up between the opponent's legs to pull the opponent over the attacking wrestler so that they fall flat on their back. At this point, the attacking wrestler would stack the fallen opponent on their shoulders for the pin. When female wrestlers use this move, commentators may refer to it as a schoolgirl. An inverted version like the regular version instead lays sideways on the butt/thigh area in a form of a bridge.

=== Sitout pin ===
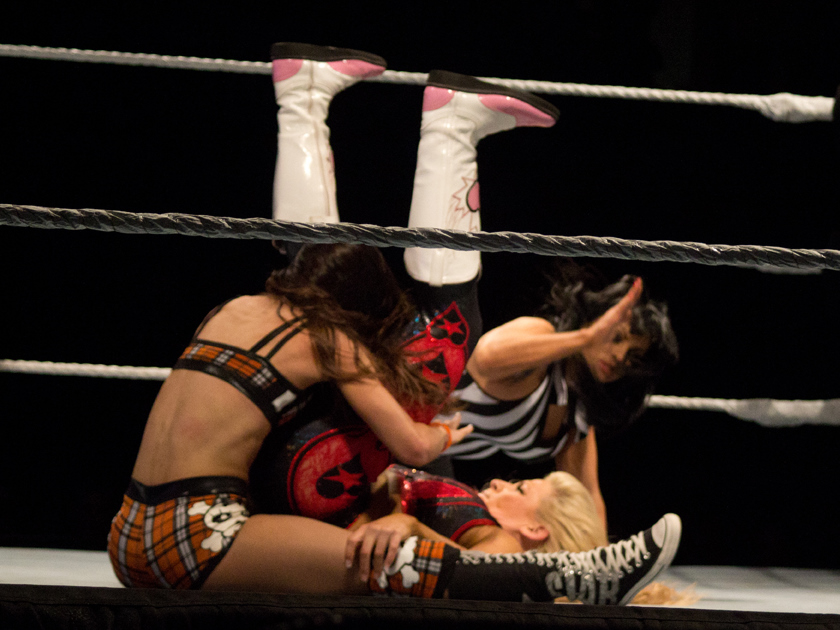
AJ Lee performs a sitout pin on Natalya.

The attacking wrestler sits down with the legs of the opponent hooked over their shoulders so that the legs and lower body of the opponent are elevated while their shoulders and upper back are in contact with the mat. The arms of the opponent are sometimes pinned beneath the legs of the attacker. This hold results from numerous throws, including the sitout powerbomb, the spin-out powerbomb, and the sunset flip. Japanese wrestler, Manami Toyota, popularized a modified pin that usually ended on a sitout position; She called it the Manami Roll.

=== Small package ===
The small package—or inside cradle—is a pinning maneuver where the attacking wrestler puts the opponent into a front face lock and pulls the opponent's near arm over their head, like a suplex. Then, the attacking wrestler hooks their opponent's far leg with the opposite leg and the opponent's other leg with their hand. The attacker will then fall back, pinning the opponent. Used by Toru Yano as finishing move. A variation preceded by an arm wrench, before delivering the small package is used by Hirooki Goto as Goto Ni Shiki.

=== Split leg ===
In this pinning maneuver, the attacking wrestler has the opponent on their back and grabs both the opponent's legs, puts them above the opponent's head, jumps up in the air, opens their legs, and falls on the opponent's legs, trapping them into a pinning situation.

=== Straddle ===
In this pinning technique, the attacking wrestler stands with their feet on either side of an opponent who is lying face-up on the mat. Then the attacker kneels across the opponent's chest facing their head, with each knee beside the chest. Sometimes the attacker sits on the opponent's chest for greater pressure. There is also a reverse variation in which the attacker is facing the opponent's feet.

The shoulder straddle pin is typical variation of the straddle pin. It sees the attacker kneeling on the opponent's shoulders facing the head, pinning them on the mat. In another variation, the attacker sits on the neck or face of the opponent with or without the knee on the shoulder. Primarily called a facesit, it is used mostly by heels or in mixed professional wrestling to demonstrate dominance and entertain the crowd.

=== Sunset flip ===
This pin commonly sees an attacking wrestler dive over an opponent who is facing them, usually bent over forwards, catching the opponent in a waistlock from behind and landing back-first behind the opponent. From that position the wrestler rolls forward into a sitting position, pulling the opponent over backwards and down to the mat so that they land on their back into a sitout pin position. While being held on the shoulders of an attacking wrestler in a position where this second wrestler is straddling the head of the attacking wrestler while facing in the other direction. One variation is the split-legged (used by some known wrestlers like Alicia Fox and the retired Christy Hemme), in which a cornered wrestler, as a counter to an oncoming opponent, jumps and splits their legs, sits on the top turnbuckle in a straddle position, then rolls forward to catch the opponent in a waistlock to roll into a usual sunset flip.

=== Victory roll ===
The attacking wrestler jumps onto the opponent's shoulders from behind and rolls forward. As the attacker flips over, they hook the opponent's shoulders with their legs, flipping the opponent over onto their shoulders. The attacker hooks both of the opponent's legs to hold them in place for the pin. This can be utilized to counter an opponent's electric chair or powerbomb attempt. Hirooki Goto innovated a variation where he rolls his opponent into a cross armbreaker.

==== Wheelbarrow victory roll ====
A slight variation of the victory roll, which sees the wrestler being wheelbarrowed by the opponent. The wrestler then "counters" the wheelbarrow by the opponent, flipping forward into a pin, with both of the opponent's legs hooked to complete the pin. The slight difference between the two variations is that the wrestler in the normal victory roll is over the opponent's shoulders, while in the wheelbarrow variation the wrestler is scissoring the opponent's body under the shoulders. The latter is more effective.

== See also ==
- Near-fall
- Pin (amateur wrestling)
