= Thigh (disambiguation) =

In anatomy, the thigh is the area of the lower extremity between the knee and the pelvis.

Thigh may also refer to:

- Thigh (poultry), a cut of poultry
- Thigh bone, also known as the femur
- Thigh kick, a move in Muay Thai
- Thigh strap (disambiguation), various meanings
- Thigh lock, a type of compression lock
- Thigh-high boots, a type of boots
