= Heel hook =

Heel hook may refer to:

- Heel hook, in grappling
- A climbing technique
