= Spinal lock =

Multiple joint lock applied to the spinal column

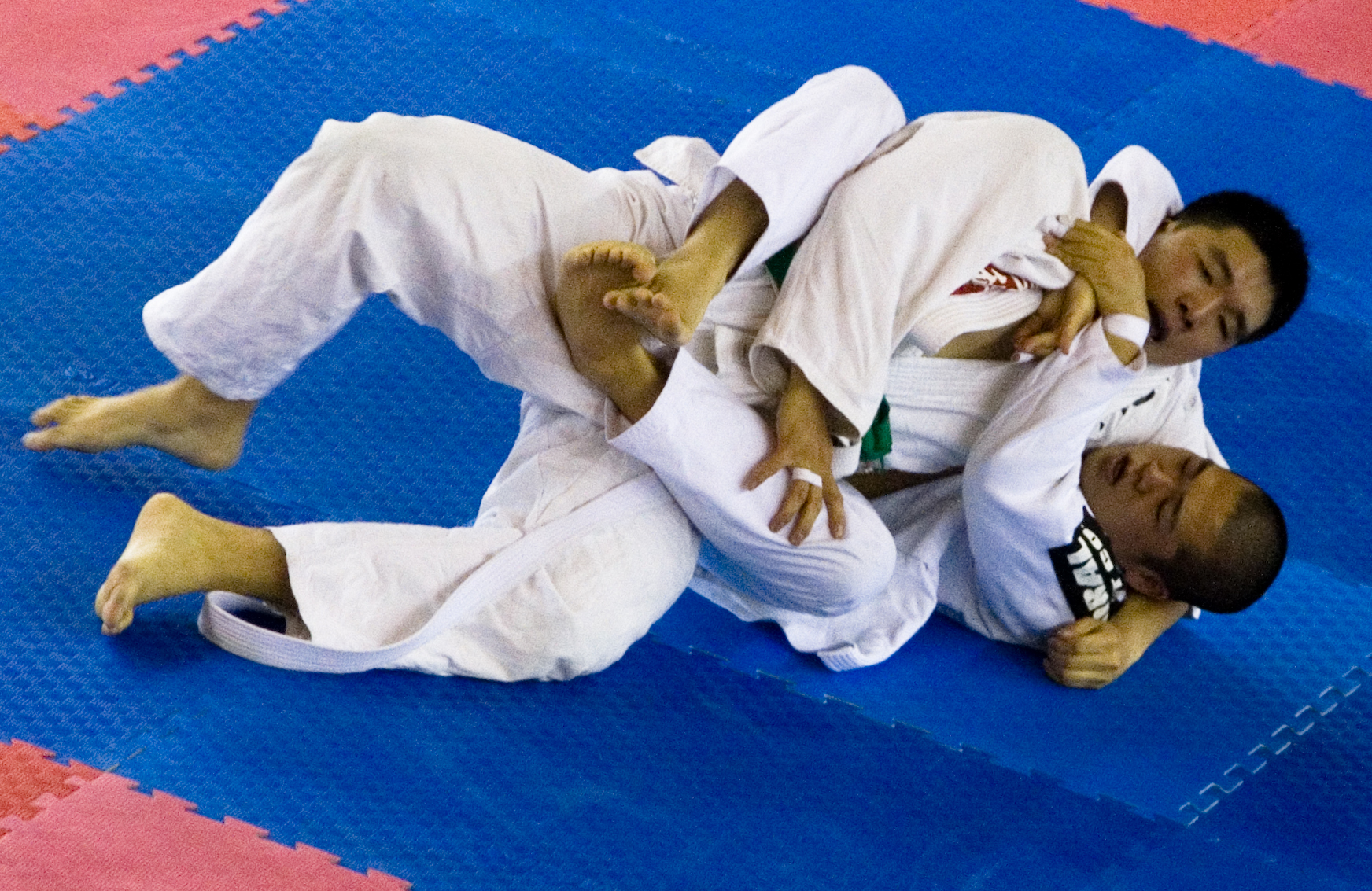
- A grappler applies a lock to his opponent's neck
- Classification: Joint-lock
- Style: Grappling
- AKA: Neck crank

In combat sports, a spinal lock is a multiple joint lock applied to the spinal column, which is performed by forcing the spine beyond its normal ranges of motion. This is typically done by bending or twisting the head or upper body into abnormal positions. Commonly, spinal locks might strain the spinal musculature or result in a mild spinal sprain, while a forcefully and/or suddenly applied spinal lock may cause severe ligament damage or damage to the vertebrae, and possibly result in serious spinal cord injury, stroke, or death. Spinal locks and cervical locks are forbidden in all gi competitions, IBJJF Brazilian jiu-jitsu competitions, amateur mixed martial arts (MMA), multiple forms of no Gi jiu-jitsu, judo, and other martial arts. However, professional MMA, some no gi Brazilian jiu-jitsu competitions and one gi & no gi promotion (grappling industries) does permit spinal locks.

Spinal locks can be separated into two categories based on their primary area of effect on the spinal column: spinal locks on the neck are called neck cranks, and locks on the lower parts of the spine are called spine cranks.

== Neck crank ==
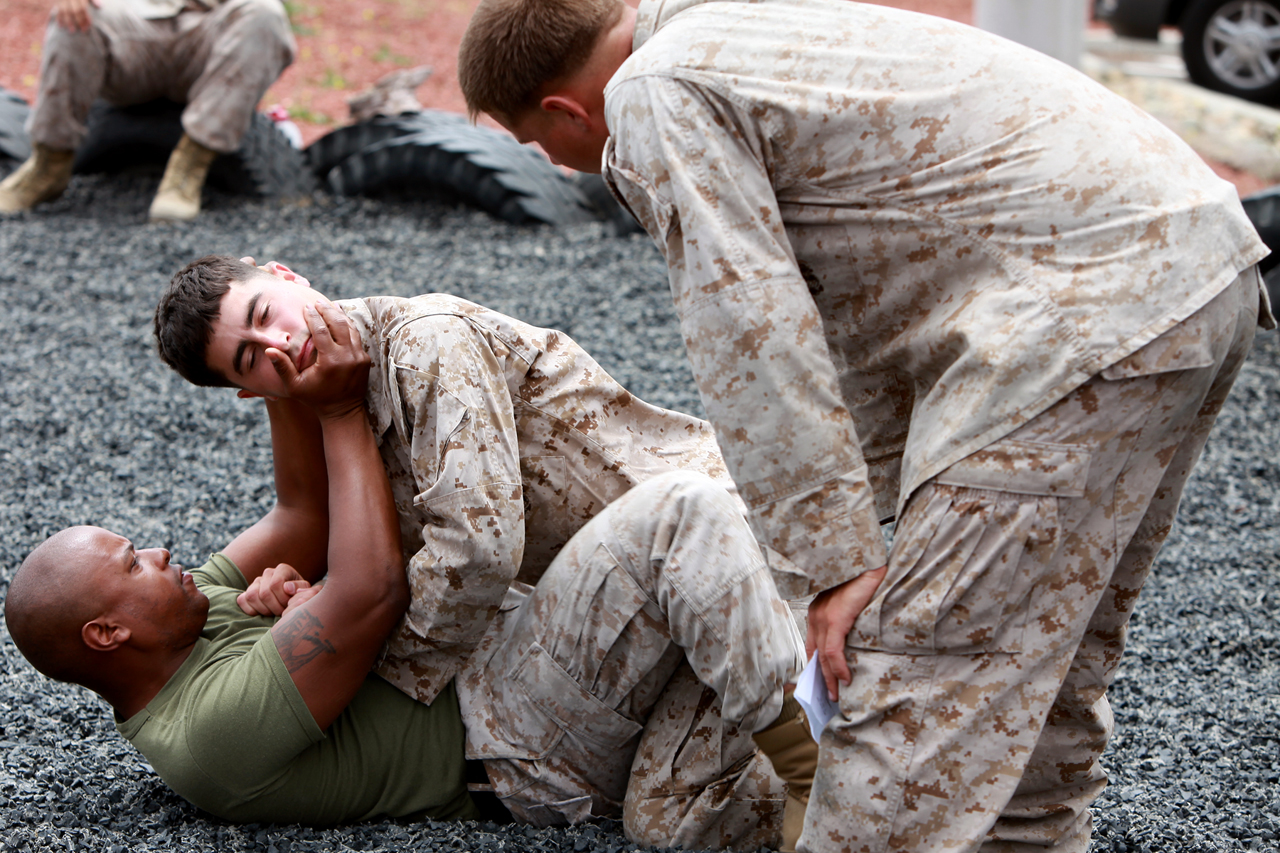
Neck crank techniques from the supine position

A neck crank (sometimes also referred to as a neck lock, and technically known as a cervical lock) is a spinal lock applied to the cervical spine causing hyperextension, hyperflexion, lateral hyperflexion, hyperrotation or extension-distraction. This happens through bending, twisting or elongating. A neck crank is typically applied by pulling or twisting the head beyond its normal ranges of rotation. Neck cranks are usually banned from sports competitions, with notable exceptions in combat sports such as submission wrestling and MMA, where they are used as submission holds or as a guard passing technique.

=== Can opener ===
The can opener (in Judo referred to as kubi-hishigi) is a hyperflexing neck crank that can be applied from the opponent's guard or from a mounted position, by grabbing the opponent's head using the hands, and forcing it towards the chest of the opponent. If applied effectively in a competition it may force the opponent to submit.

This may also refer to a type of neck compression employed from a rear mount position in which the back of the thumbs are used to drive into the neck starting from the high trapezius muscle toward the sternocleidomastoid muscles, causing severe discomfort and even submission. As of 2006, this is permitted in shiai (competition) as long as the combatant's thumbs remain straight and not bent. Its most common uses are to open up an opponent's chin for shime-waza or as a diversionary tactic.

=== Cattle catch ===
The cattle catch (also referred to as reverse crucifix, iron cross or stocks) is a hyperflexing neck crank involving trapping the opponent's hands and forcing the head towards their chest. The technique is performed with the opponent lying on their back, and the combatant performing the neck crank perpendicularly face-down in a side mount position above the head of the opponent, with the opponent's head resting towards their armpit. The combatant traps one arm using the legs, and the other using the arms. By using the pinned arms and legs as a point of leverage, the combatant can forcefully crank the head towards the opponent's chest.

=== Crucifix neck crank ===
The crucifix neck crank is similar to the cattle catch, but involves the combatant performing the neck crank being mounted on the opponent. Both of the opponent's arms are controlled, and the opponent's head is held in the armpit. By cranking the body upwards while keeping a tight hold on the opponent's arms, the opponent's head is forced towards their chest.

Both the cattle catch and the crucifix neck crank are colloquially referred to simply as the crucifix, which often leads to confusion with the traditional crucifix position.

=== Twister ===
The twister (a similar move in wrestling is known as a guillotine) is a sideways body bend and neck crank, which involves forcing the head towards the shoulder while controlling the body, hence causing lateral hyperflexion of the cervical spine. The technique involves tension in several body parts, and depending on the flexibility of the recipient, can also involve pain in the knees, abdomen and torso. The twister is often confused with the spine crank since it involves a degree of lateral non-cervical spinal flexion. The main pressure is, however, on the cervical spine, making it a neck crank. It is performed from a back mount single vine ride position, where the top combatant has one "hook" threaded through the bottom opponent's legs and secured behind the ankle. The combatant then pulls the opponent's opposite arm behind their own head and grabs hold of the opponent's head, pulling it down to the shoulder. The move was popularized by Eddie Bravo and the 10th Planet Jiu-Jitsu system. On March 26, 2011 Chan Sung Jung finished Leonard Garcia at UFC Fight Night: Seattle in round 2 of their fight using a twister. This was the first and only twister finish in UFC history until Bryce Mitchell defeated Matt Sayles with the maneuver in December 2019. The third instance was during UFC Vegas 78, when Da'Mon Blackshear finished Jose Johnson with a twister.

Prior to this, Shuichiro Katsumura defeated Hiroyuki Yamashiro with a twister in ZST 20 on May 24, 2009. Shayna Baszler also submitted Megumi Yabushita with a twister on January 30, 2010. On December 31, 2014, Shinya Aoki scored a first-round twister win over Yuki Yamamoto at Inoki Genome Federation's Inoki Bom-Ba-Ye 2014. At the 2015 ADCC tournament in São Paulo, Vinny Magalhaes submitted Rodrigo Artilheiro in the quarterfinals using a twister. Angela Lee defeated Natalie Gonzalez Hills by twister at One FC: Pride of Lions.

This move is also used in professional wrestling by various performers such as JD McDonagh, Tama Tonga, and Matt Riddle.

=== Standing frontal facelock ===
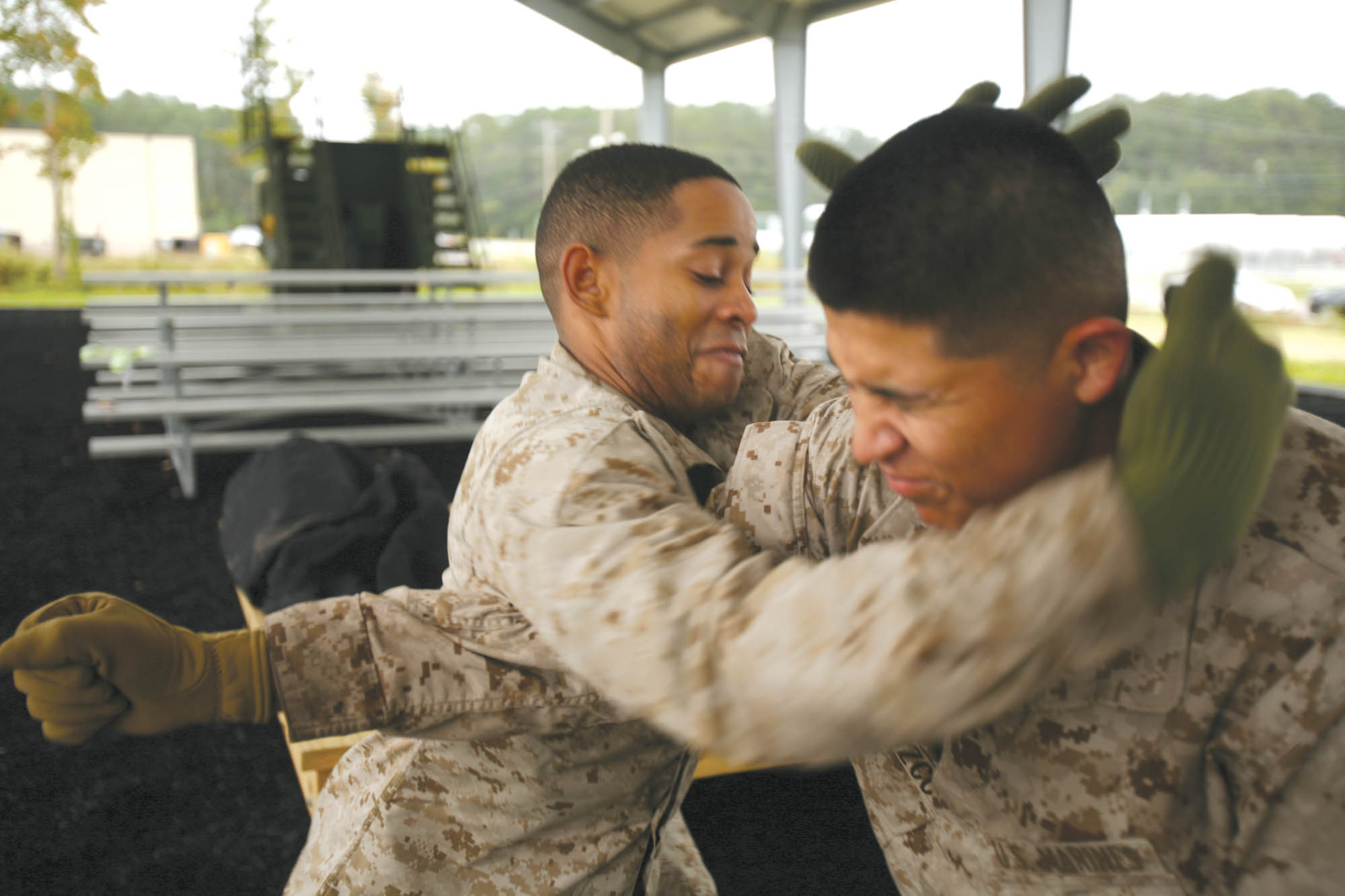
Standing neck crank set-up

This technique involves facing the opponent as though leveraging a guillotine, but cross facing the individual and rotating their head laterally, creating an incredibly dangerous hyperflexion of the neck sideways when hips are leveraged and the cross face is pulled up, attempting to apply extreme pressure and damage to the cervical vertebrae.

== Spine crank ==
A spine crank (the term spine lock is also often used to refer exclusively to this type) is a spinal lock that affects the thoracic and/or lumbar regions of the spinal column. A spine crank is applied by twisting or bending the upper body beyond its normal ranges of motion, causing hyperextension, hyperflexion, or hyperrotation of the spine. In martial arts, spine cranks are generally rarer techniques than neck cranks because they are more difficult to apply. Twisting or bending the upper body to apply pressure to the spinal column requires large amounts of leverage compared to twisting or bending the head.

One of the most well known spine cranks is the Boston crab, which is usually seen in pro-wrestling. Similarly to neck cranks, spine cranks are illegal techniques in most combat sports, excluding some submission wrestling and mixed martial arts competitions, where they are used as submission holds. Even if allowed, spine cranks are very rarely featured because of the difficulty of applying them. Jonno Mears is the only combatant to have ever won a mixed martial arts bout with a Boston crab, which he achieved in 2017.

== See also ==
- Armlock
- Leglock
- Small joint manipulation
- Wristlock
