= Toehold =

- In climbing, a support for the toe of the foot, to aid in ascent
- In grappling, a type of ankle lock.
