= Figure-four (grappling hold) =

Catch wrestling term

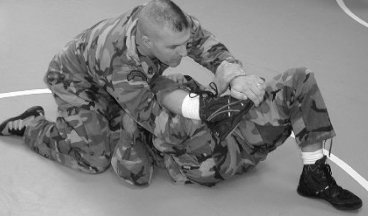
- Figure-four formation in a toe hold
- Classification: Joint-lock
- Style: Wrestling
- AKA: Figure-four leglock, nyfigure-four hold

A figure-four is a catch wrestling term for a joint-lock that resembles the number "4". A keylock or toe hold can be referred to as a figure-four hold, when it involves a figure-four formation with the legs or arms. If the figure-four involves grabbing the wrists with both hands, it is called a double wrist lock; known as kimura in MMA circles. A figure-four hold done with the legs around the neck and (usually) arm of an opponent is called figure-four (leg-)choke, better known as a triangle choke, and is a common submission in modern mixed martial arts, Submission wrestling and Brazilian jiu jitsu, and Catch wrestling. In addition to Lancashire, or catch-as-catch-can wrestling, the move was also found in jujutsu, and was thereafter incorporated into Judo. The leg figure-four choke is also part of Japanese martial arts, where it is known as Sankaku-Jime.
