= Small joint manipulation =

Grappling method

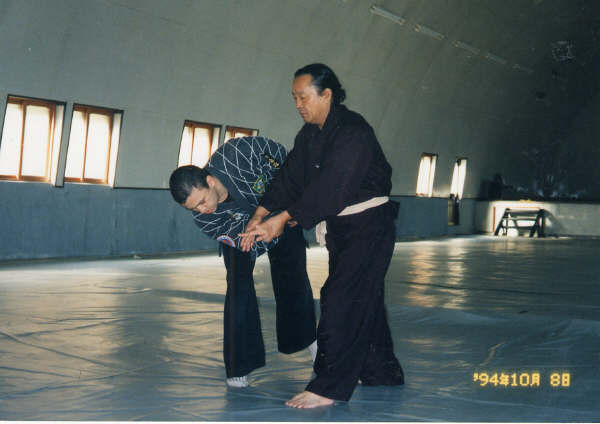
- Classification: Joint-lock

Small joint manipulation, in grappling, refers to twisting, pulling or bending fingers, toes, wrists and ankles to cause joint locks in the various joints in those appendages.

== Technique ==
Most small joint manipulation is done on the hands or feet to hyperextend joints as part of a pain compliance strategy. The basic techniques of small-joint manipulation involve grabbing and bending back one or more fingers/toes and by applying pressure to the wrist/ankle joints that disrupt the interconnectivity of the system of smaller joints within. If pain compliance does not work, such hyperextension can tear tendons in the wrist or break the smaller bones in the hands and feet. The leverage needed for such joint manipulation is comparatively small and creates a distinct advantage over techniques in martial arts that require the exertion of large amounts of force, thus small joint manipulation can allow a weaker person, with the right training, to control a stronger one.

Small joint manipulation is an illegal technique in most combat sports that feature joint locking such as Brazilian Jiu-Jitsu, judo, mixed martial arts and Sambo, since unlike standard joint locks, there is less of an opportunity to submit before the small joint breaks. Most combat sports post-2015 have identified and limited definitions of small joint locks to finger and toe locks. Although, wrist locks are also severely limited in most of these sports because of rules forbidding grabbing handguards or hands, forbidding the use of pressure points, and the protections provided from the handguards and taping of the wrists. Small Joint Locks are, however, taught as a self-defense and pain compliance technique, for instance in hapkido, Chin Na, jujutsu, Krav Maga, and aikido.

== See also ==
- Armlock
- Leglock
- Spinal lock
- Wristlock
