= Wristlock =

Martial arts technique

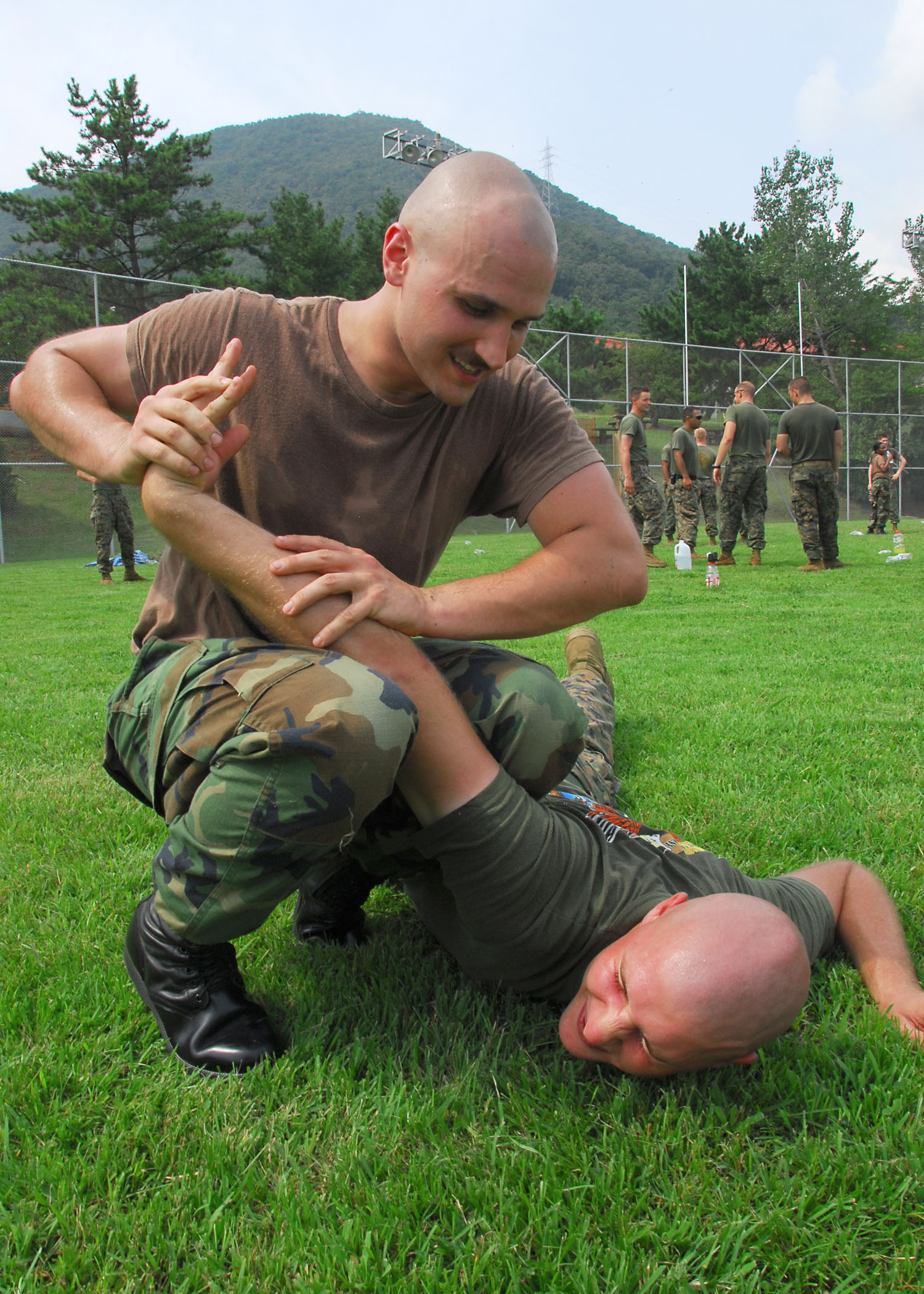
- A pronating wristlock used to hold a man's head down
- Classification: Joint-lock
- Style: Jujutsu

A wristlock is a joint lock primarily affecting the wrist-joint and, in some cases, the radioulnar joints through rotation of the hand. A wristlock is typically applied by grabbing the opponent's hand, and bending and/or twisting it. Wristlocks are very common in martial arts such as chin-na, aikido, hapkido and jujutsu where they are featured as self-defense techniques. They are also used as submission holds in martial arts such as Brazilian jiu-jitsu (where the most common name is mão de vaca, "the cow's hand") and catch wrestling. While being an illegal technique in modern sambo and judo competitions, it is still practiced in judo forms of self-defense kata kōdōkan goshinjutsu. Wristlocks are also widely used as pain compliance holds, often in police, military, and residential treatment centers.

The wristlock is a technique that can be applied from a stand-up position, simply by grabbing the opponent's hand and twisting and/or bending it in a non-natural direction. It is considered to be a relatively safe technique to practice with a willing opponent, but if applied suddenly and/or forcefully, a wristlock can cause ligament tears or possibly even dislocation or bone fractures.

Mixed martial arts (MMA) organizations usually allow wrist locks, but they are rarely performed as a result of the grappling gloves and wrist wraps typically worn by MMA fighters, which both restrict the movement of the wrist. Wrist locks are seen as being easy to defend against, and often leave the attacker vulnerable to punches and elbow strikes.

== Types ==
=== Rotational ===
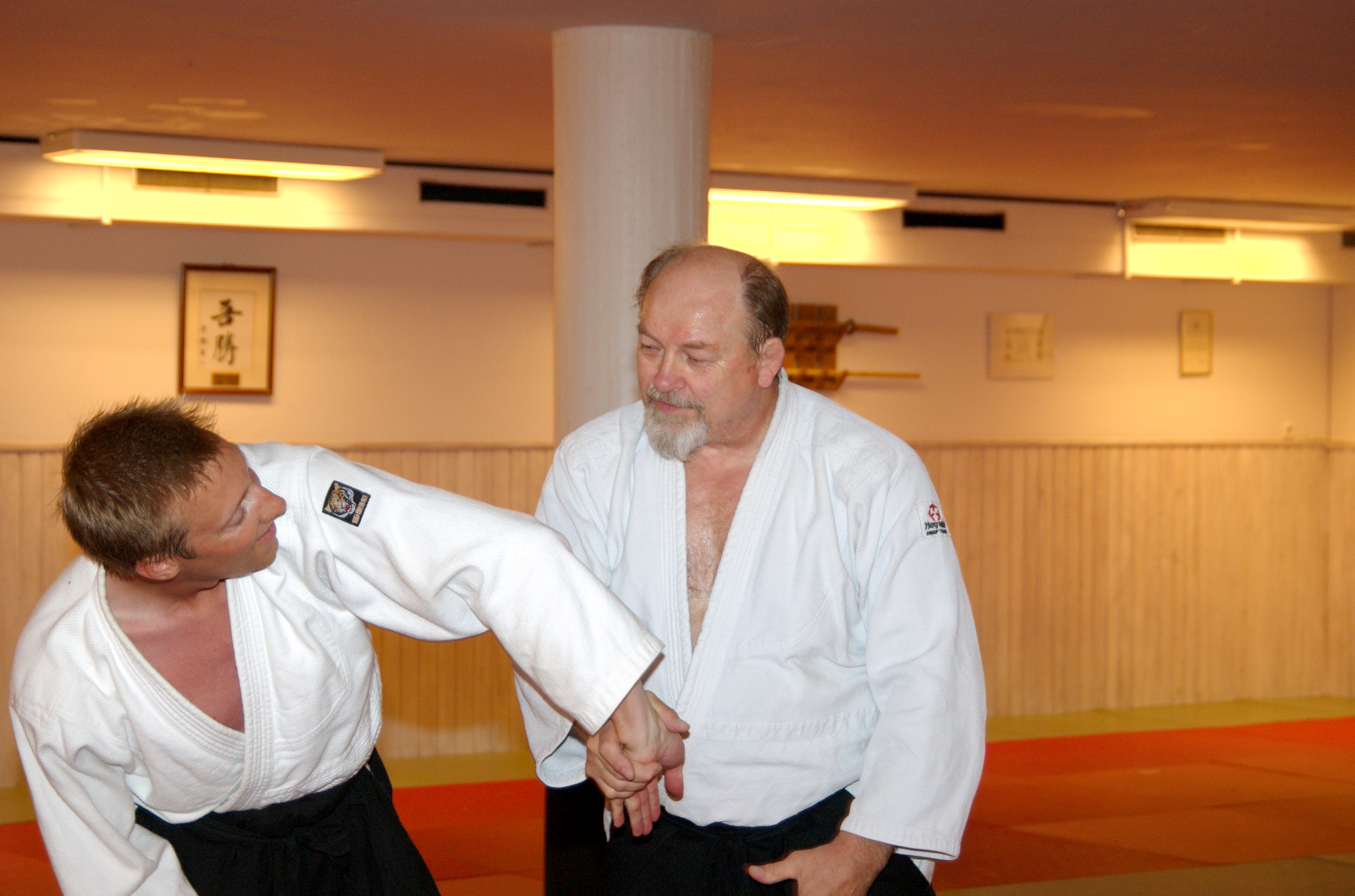
Rotational wristlock by an Aikido instructor

A rotational wristlock (in budo referred to as kote hineri, and in Aikido referred to as a type of sankyō, 三教, "third teaching") is a very common type of wristlock, and involves forced supination or pronation of the wrist, and is typically applied by grabbing and twisting the hand. The wrist joint does not allow rotating motion, and the force is transferred to the forearm causing radioulnar rotation, eventually resulting in a joint lock on the radioulnar joint. Once the radius and ulna have been brought to their extreme positions, further twisting motion will put severe torque on the wrist. In martial arts, standing rotational wristlocks are often accompanied by the opponent instinctively throwing him or herself to escape or alleviate the lock.

=== Supinating ===
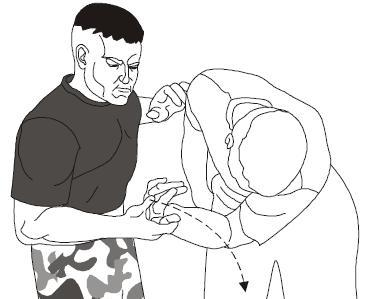
A supinating wristlock demonstrated.

The supinating wristlock (in budō referred to as kote gaeshi, 小手返, "forearm return") is a rotational wristlock, and arguably the most common wristlock. It involves rotating the hand so that it becomes maximally supinated, often referred to as 'externally rotating' the wrist, and hence putting a joint lock on the wrist and radioulnar joint. This can be done by grabbing the opponent's hand with one or both hands, and twisting the hand so that the opponent's thumb points away from the opponent. A supinating wristlock performed from a stand-up position can be used to force the opponent to the ground on his or her back. Straightening the arm does not alleviate the pressure, since the shoulder joint does not allow further supination of the hand.

A properly executed lock of this type does not apply torque to the wrist itself. In practice, the bones of the forearm and, eventually, the shoulder are the focus of the lock. If performed correctly, this technique will break the opponent's wrist, elbow and dislocate the shoulder. In practice, uke will turn over his own arm in order to prevent his wrist from breaking. The goal of almost all throws executed via joint/bone manipulation, at least from the perspective of some classical (koryu) martial arts, is to break or dislocate one or more limbs.

=== Pronating ===
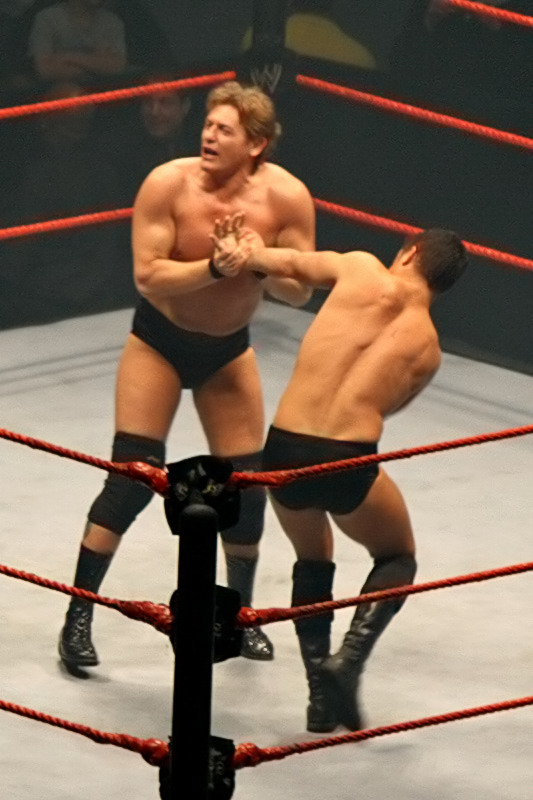
Pronating wristlock in a professional wrestling match. Here, William Regal is applying the hold to Cody Rhodes.

The pronating wristlock (in budō referred to as kote mawashi, 小手回し, "forearm turn", and in Aikido referred to as nikyō, 二教, "second teaching") is similar to the supinating wristlock except that it is reversed in direction, known as 'internally rotating' the wrist. The hand becomes maximally pronated, resulting in a joint lock on the wrist and radioulnar joint. The degree of possible pronation depends on the degree of flexion at the elbow, as a bent elbow inhibits rotation of the humerus. Hence, straightening the arm allows rotation of the whole arm and alleviates the pressure on the joints. The arm has to be additionally twisted until the shoulder joint reaches maximal rotation to preserve the joint lock. This typically results in the arm moving posteriorly, and allows for the complementary technique of pushing the arm at the elbow or shoulder to force the opponent to the ground.

=== Hyperflexing ===
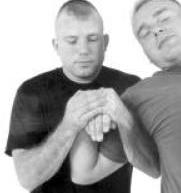
A hyperflexing wristlock used as a pain compliance technique.

A hyperflexing wristlock (commonly referred to as a "gooseneck" and in budō referred to as tekubi gatame, 手首固め, "wrist lock") involves forcing the wrist into hyperflexion by pushing or pulling the hand towards the inside of the forearm. A hyperflexing wristlock is often performed in combination with rotational wristlocks, since the hyperflexed hand provides a good lever for twisting, and in addition it increases the overall effectiveness of the wristlock. Hyperflexing wristlocks are often featured as pain compliance techniques, since they allow for good control, and a gradual pain increase if more leverage is added. Hyperflexing wristlocks are also a typical wristlock used as a submission hold. Hyperflexing wrist locks, often applied after an escape from a rotational wrist lock, is a signature technique in Chen-style tai chi.

=== Hyperextending ===
The "hyperextending wristlock" is often combined with a fingerlock as the wristlock itself is not very strong. It involves bending the wrist so that the knuckles travel back toward the forearm.

=== Adductive ===
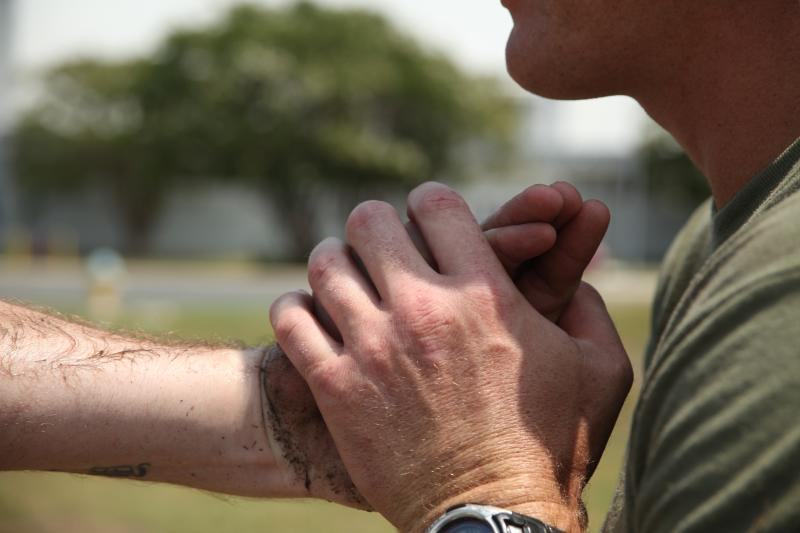
By pressing the opponent's wrist downwards, the hand is forced into extreme ulnar deviation.

An adductive wristlock (in budō referred to as kote hono gaeshi, "partial forearm return", part of aikido's nikyō, or second teaching, in its ura form) involves forced ulnar deviation of the hand. It is typically applied by twisting the opponent's arm so that the opponent's palm points laterally and the elbow is slightly bent. The hand is then grabbed using one or both hands, and the wrist is forced downwards, hence reaching the limit of possible ulnar deviation, and creating a potent joint lock on the wrist joint. To avoid damage, it is possible for the opponent to drop down to the ground, and alleviate the pressure. The adductive wristlock is often taught as a self-defense technique against grabbing. It is also commonly referred to as a "Z-Lock" because the bend of the arm forms a Z. In some parts of America this is also called the "Goose Neck" because the bend of the arm forms a S.

== See also ==
- Armlock
- Leglock
- Small joint manipulation
- Spinal lock
- Chin na
