= Guillotine (wrestling) =

Amateur wrestling move

The Guillotine is an amateur wrestling move named after the decapitation device. It was developed in the 1920s by Cornell 1928 NCAA champion Ralph Leander Lupton. It is mostly taught in high schools. It is a pinning move that is deployed from upper referee position. It uses pain to force an opponent to go to their back. It is a combination of leg riding and an open side hook. In mixed martial arts and submission grappling, it is sometimes referred to as the Twister and has been taught extensively by Eddie Bravo in his 10th planet jiu-jitsu system. It is not to be confused with the guillotine choke, a move from the front headlock position that is used in submission grappling.

== Description ==
Initially a leg ride is secured. From the top, the same side leg must hook opponent's inside thigh, gripping the ankle with the attacker's foot. Next the attacker reaches across to grab the arm opposite to the side that the leg ride is on. This arm is pulled back and up to allow the attacker to slip his head under it, at or just above the elbow. (The guillotine is most easily applied if the opponent is reaching back during the leg ride.)

Once the attacker's head is situated under the opponent's arm, the head is used to lift and turn the arm and opponent. The attacker's other arm is applied under the opponent's arm and behind his head in a similar fashion to a half nelson. As the attacker rolls backward and the opponent is on his back, one of the attacker's arms will be under his body. This arm then releases the wrist of the trapped arm. Next the attacker must reach across his opponent and lock his arms, straightening them as much as possible.

This final position is the guillotine, and the attacker applies it by squeezing as softly as possible (to avoid spinal injury) while maintaining the leg hook to prevent the opponent from escaping.

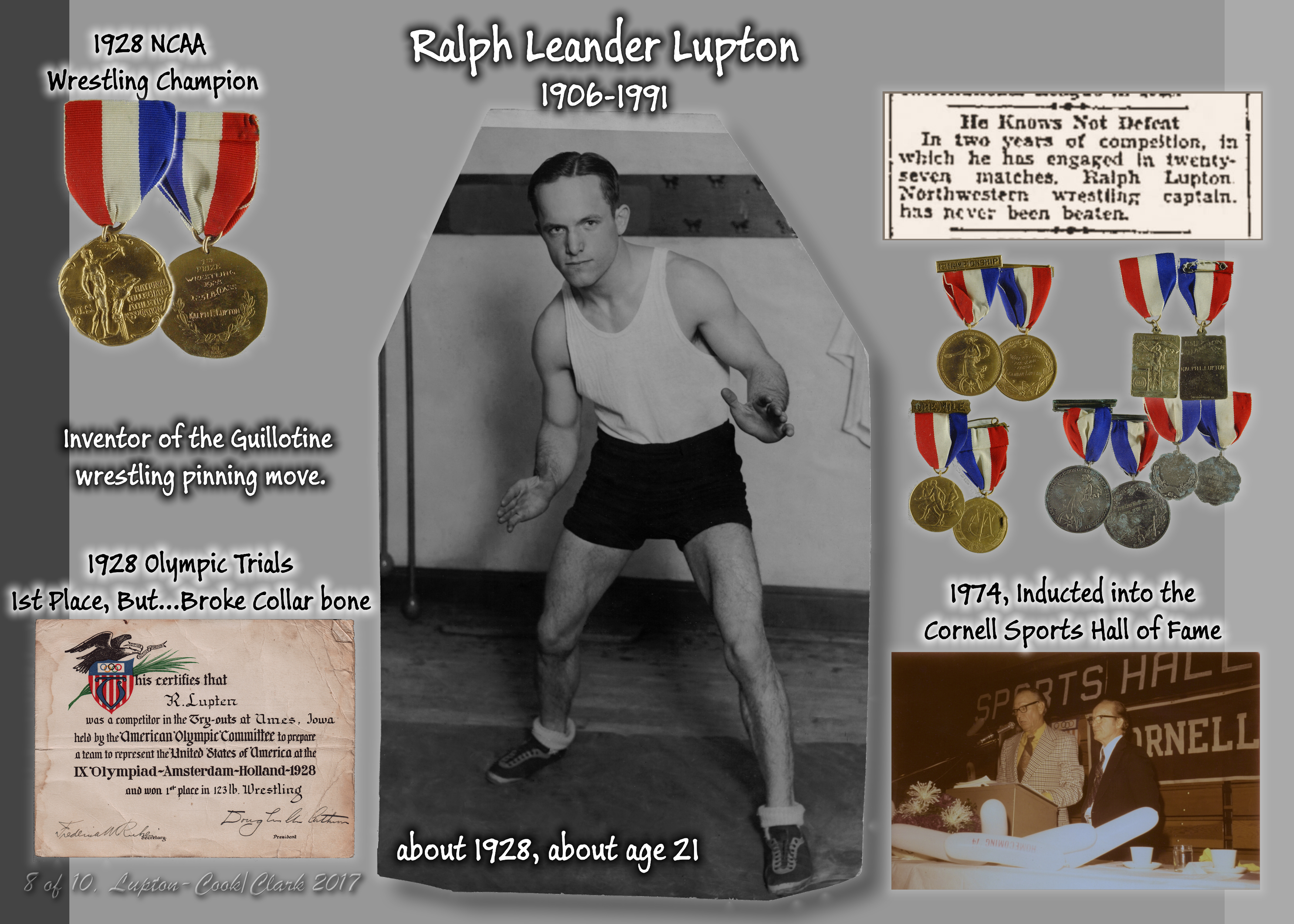
Ralph Leander Lupton, circa 1928
