= Pin (sport wrestling) =

Victory condition in amateur wrestling

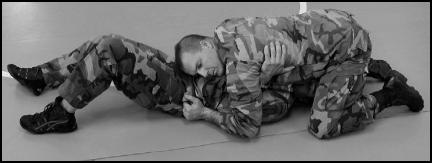
- Classification: Grappling hold
- Style: Wrestling, Judo, Aikido
- AKA: Fall

A pin, or fall, is a victory condition in various forms of wrestling that is met by holding an opponent's shoulders or scapulae (shoulder blades) on the wrestling mat for a prescribed period of time.This article deals with the pin as it is defined in amateur wrestling.

A pin ends a match regardless of when it occurs. Situations which are almost pins but for whatever reason do not meet the criteria—for example, have only one shoulder down or have the defending wrestler blocked in a neck bridge—are rewarded with exposure points (in collegiate wrestling, known as near fall points or back points) in order to encourage wrestlers to take risks to try to pin their opponents.

== Conditions ==
=== Greco-Roman and freestyle ===
In Greco-Roman and freestyle wrestling, the two shoulders of the defensive wrestler must be held long enough for the referee to "observe the total control of the fall" (usually ranging from one half-second to about one or two seconds). Then either the judge or the mat chairman concurs with the referee that a fall is made. (If the referee does not indicate a fall, and the fall is valid, the judge and the mat chairman can concur together and announce the fall.) In the United States, for the Kids' Freestyle and Greco-Roman wrestling division, which includes wrestlers ages 8 to 14 in competitions sponsored by USA Wrestling, a fall must be held for two seconds.

=== High school and collegiate wrestling ===
In American collegiate wrestling, a pin must be held for one second. In American scholastic (or folkstyle) wrestling, a pin must be held for two seconds.

== Techniques ==
=== Half nelson ===
In the half nelson, the attacking wrestler is on top of the opponent on the ground with both wrestlers face down; a half nelson can be used to turn the opponent over. The attacker's arm is pushed below the opponent's shoulder from the outside, and across and behind the opponent's neck. The attacker's arm lifts the opponent's shoulder while the attacker's hand presses his neck down; simultaneously the attacker drives forward perpendicularly to the opponent's body to roll him over onto his back. With the opponent on his back and the attacker perpendicular to him chest-on-chest, the attacker tightens his arm around the opponent's neck, often also controlling the opponent's lower body by hooking the free arm in the opponent's crotch or around the near or far thigh.

=== Three-quarter nelson ===
In a three-quarter nelson, one arm again goes under the opponent's shoulder and behind his neck to press it down, but in addition the attacker's other arm goes under the opponent's body from the same side, across the body to the other side of the neck, and up the other side of the neck to lock with the first hand behind the neck and press down. Again the attacker drives forward to roll the opponent over; once that is accomplished, the attacker can convert to a half nelson or, if the attacker's leg has hooked behind the opponent's knee, the three-quarter nelson can be maintained to accomplish the pin.

=== Cradle ===
A cradle is a move where the attacker performs the cradle by grabbing the neck of his opponent with one arm, and wrapping the elbow of the other arm behind the knee of the opponent. The wrestler then locks both hands together, forcing the opponent's knee toward his face, and rolls the opponent over onto his back. The hooked leg can be either the near leg (a "near-side cradle") or the far leg (a "far-side cradle").

=== Armbar or chicken wing ===
In an armbar, the top wrestler, just to his opponent's left, grasps the opponent's left elbow with his left hand, putting his right arm on his waist in front of his right hip. He quickly pull his left arm out while still holding onto it. He pushes him down with his body, using his right knee to push him forward and off-balance. He then grabs his right wrist with the right hand and pulls it outward. His belly is now down on the mat, legs flat. The aggressor is above the opponent with his chest several inches above his back. The aggressor's left knee holds up most of his own body weight. The aggressor's right leg is extended between his legs with the ball of the foot on the floor. The aggressor curls his wrist, then encloses the opponent's left arm inside the aggressor's left elbow joint. With the aggressor's chest is resting on the opponent's left elbow, he uses his body to push his left shoulder into his ear, using both legs for leverage. He slowly moves his feet into a walking position while crouched, walking in a circle and rolling the opponent over onto his back without releasing his arms. The pin is finished by the aggressor leaning on his knees with his chest toward the floor.

=== Guillotine ===
A guillotine is initiated when both wrestlers are face down on the mat, the attacker on top of the opponent. The attacker hooks one leg around the opponent's same-side leg, also hooking the ankle with the foot. The attacker reaches across to grab the arm opposite to the side that the leg ride is on. This arm is pulled back and up to allow the attacker to slip his head under it, at or just above the elbow. (The guillotine is most easily applied if the opponent is reaching back during the leg ride.) The attacker uses his head to lift and turn the arm and opponent. The attacker's leg-hook-side arm is applied under the opponent's arm and behind his head in a similar fashion to a half nelson. The attacker rolls backward to roll the opponent is onto his back, and the attacker locks his hands around the opponent's neck.
