= Joint lock =

Grappling technique for submission

Joint Lock
- Style: Brazilian Jiu-Jitsu, Judo, Sambo, Mixed martial arts, Shuai Jiao, Kūdō, Submission wrestling, different traditional martial arts

A joint lock is a grappling technique involving manipulation of an opponent's joints in such a way that the joints reach their maximal degree of motion and hyperextension.

In judō these are referred to as kansetsu-waza (関節技, "joint locking technique") and in Chinese martial arts as qin na, which literally means "catching and locking". In Korea these are referred to as gwan-jeol-gi (관절기, joint skill) or gwan-jeol-kkeok-gi (관절꺾기, joint breaking).

Joint locks typically involve isolating a particular joint, levering it in an attempt to force the joint to move past its normal range of motion. Joint locks generate varying degrees of pain in the joints and, if applied forcefully and/or suddenly, may cause injury, such as muscle, tendon and ligament damage and even dislocation or bone fracture.

In judo, the combining of standing locks with throws is forbidden due to the risk of physical harm to the falling opponent, while Brazilian jiu-jitsu competitions allow their use.

== Types ==
Joint locks can be divided into five general types according to which section of the body they affect:

- Armlocks
- Leglocks
- Small joint manipulation
- Spinal locks
- Wristlocks

These general types can be further divided into subtypes according to which specific joint(s) they affect, or the type of motion they involve.

== Usage ==
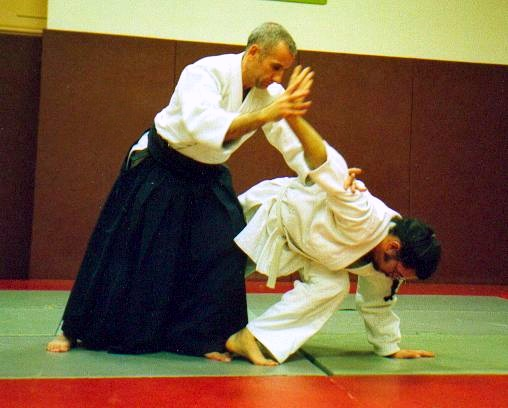
An aikidoka applying a wristlock and armlock combination as a pain compliance hold

Joint locks are commonly featured in all forms of grappling, whether it be in martial arts, self-defense, combat sport or hand to hand combat application. The variants involving lesser levering on a smaller joint (such as wristlocks) are often featured in law-enforcement or self-defense application, where they are used as pain compliance holds. Joint locks that involve full body leverage can on the other hand be used in hand to hand combat to partially or fully disable an opponent, by tearing major joints such as knees or elbows.

Common martial arts featuring joint locks include Aikido, Brazilian Jiu-Jitsu, Catch Wrestling, Eskrima, Eagle Claw, Fu Jow Pai, Hapkido, Hung Gar, Jujutsu, Judo, Sambo, Ninjutsu, Shoot wrestling, and mixed martial arts. They are usually practiced in a maximally safe manner, with controlled movements, and releasing the joint lock once it is apparent that it has been effectively applied. In combat sports, joint locks are used as submission holds, and are intended to force the opponent to submit; the lock will be controlled and held until an opponent submits or a referee recognizes the threat of injury and intervenes. The types of joint locks allowed in competitions featuring them varies according to the perceived danger in their application. Armlocks are generally considered safer, while small joint manipulation and spinal locks are banned in nearly all combat sports.

== See also ==
- Chokehold
- Compression lock
- Grappling hold
