= Compression lock =

Grappling hold that presses muscle into bone

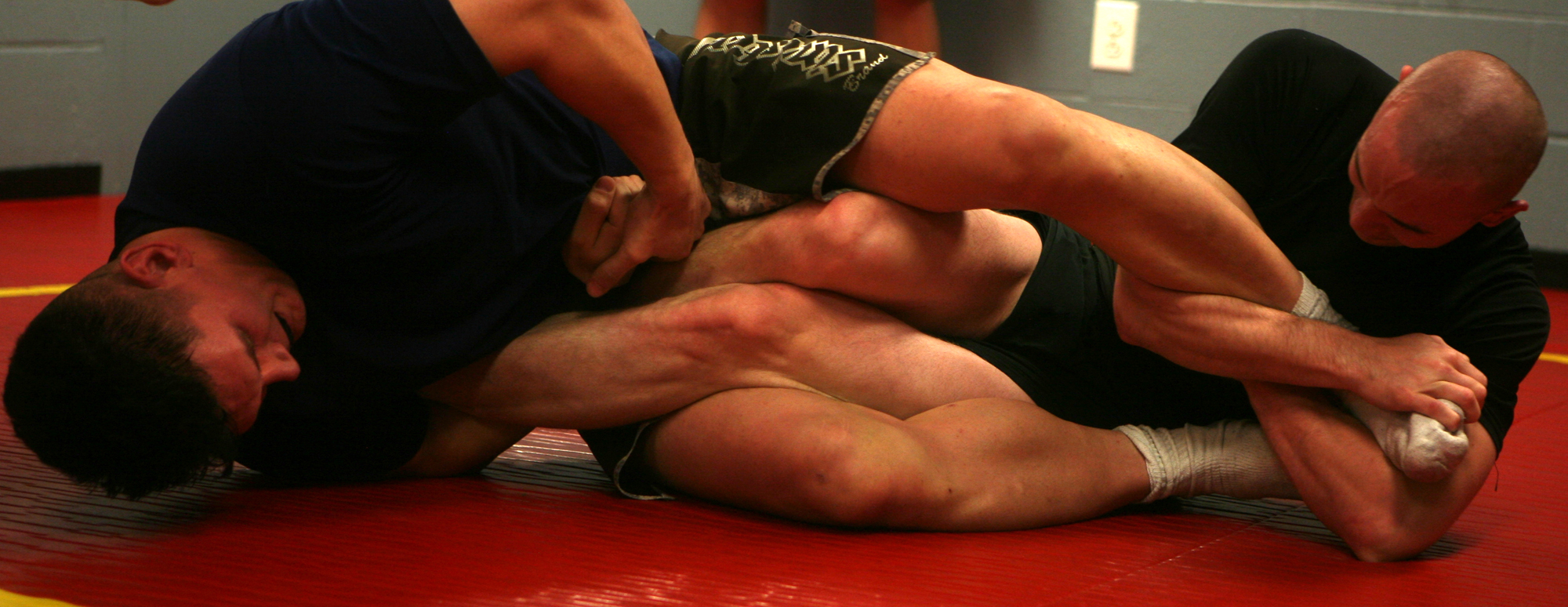
- mutual Achilles
- Style: Various Grappling Styles
- Child hold(s): Achilles lock

A compression lock, muscle lock, muscle slicer or muscle crusher, is a grappling hold that causes severe pain by pressing a muscle into a bone. A compression lock can cause a joint lock in a nearby joint when it is applied by squeezing a limb over a fulcrum. A forceful compression lock may damage muscles and tendons, and if accompanied by a joint lock, may also result in torn ligaments, dislocation or bone fractures. Compression locks can be used as pain compliance holds, and are sometimes featured in combat sports as submission holds.

== Achilles lock ==
An Achilles lock (also called an Achilles hold or Achilles squeeze or Ashi-Hishigi in judo) is a compression lock that involves pressing the Achilles tendon into the back of the ankle or lower leg. It is typically performed by wedging a forearm, especially a bony part of it, into the Achilles tendon, while leveraging the foot and the leg over the forearm serving as a fulcrum. This causes severe pressure on the Achilles tendon, and often also results in an ankle lock, since the ankle is being used as a point of leverage. Similarly, some ankle locks also cause a compression lock on the Achilles tendon, and hence the term "Achilles lock" is often also used to describe such ankle locks.

== Biceps slicer ==
A biceps slicer (also called a biceps lock or biceps crusher) is a compression lock that involves pushing the biceps into the humerus. An effective biceps slicer can be applied by putting an arm or leg as a fulcrum on the opponent's arm at the inside of the arm by the elbow, and flexing the opponent's arm over the fulcrum. This will result in the biceps and forearm being pressed into the fulcrum. The biceps slicer becomes most effective as a compression lock when the bony parts of the limb such as the shin or any of the bones in the forearm are forced into the biceps of the opponent. The biceps slicer can also become a potent armlock when it is applied in this manner, because the leverage causes an elongating and separating tension in the elbow joint, making this a legal technique in judo competition. In Brazilian jiu-jitsu competitions however, the biceps slicer is an illegal technique in lower level divisions of some major tournaments. In catch wrestling biceps slicer variation is called short-arm scissors.

== Leg slicer ==
A leg slicer (depending on the affected muscle also called for instance calf slicer or thigh crusher) is a compression lock that involves pressing the calf and/or thigh muscle into one of the bones in the leg. Similarly to the biceps slicer, a leg slicer can be applied by inserting an arm or leg in the backside of the knee, and flexing the opponent's leg to apply pressure to the muscles surrounding the fulcrum. Generally, the direction of the shin in the leg acting as a fulcrum will determine where the larger part of the pressure will go. Such leg slicers can be used as effective leglocks to the knee through a separating and elongating motion. Similarly to the biceps slicer, the calf slicer is listed as a banned technique in the lower levels of some major Brazilian jiu-jitsu competitions.

In professional wrestling, wrestlers AJ Styles uses this as a submission finisher move, calling it the Calf Killer in NJPW and TNA and the Calf Crusher in WWE while Zack Sabre Jr. mostly uses it as a move to transition into a Banana split.

== See also ==
- Chokehold
- Joint lock
