= Leglock =

Grappling technique in martial arts

- Classification: Joint-lock
- Style: Shoot wrestling, Sambo, Jiu-Jitsu, Catch wrestling, Judo

A leglock is a joint lock that is directed at joints of the leg such as the ankle, knee or hip joint. A leglock which is directed at joints in the foot is sometimes referred to as a foot lock and a lock at the hip as a hip lock. Leglocks are featured, with various levels of restrictions, in combat sports and martial arts such as Sambo, Brazilian Jiu-Jitsu, catch wrestling, mixed martial arts, Shootwrestling and submission wrestling, but are banned in some sports featuring joint locks such as judo. The technique has been seen across a wide range of different combat sports and is reportedly over 2,500 years old, having been seen in the lost art of Pankration in the original Olympic Games.

As with other jointlocks, leglocks are more effective with full body leverage. Some attack the large joints of the knee or hip and involve utilizing leverage to counteract the larger muscle groups, while others directly attack ligaments in the knee or the smaller joint of the ankle. Leglocks can involve control positions such as the inside leg triangle or leg knot to maintain control while applying the attack or transitioning between two attacks, though they and some other control positions are banned in Brazilian Jiu-jitsu competition. Some other leglock control positions have been adopted into modern BJJ and submission grappling competitions as "guards" such as the snake guard, one-legged X-guard, and 50/50 Guard, where they are used for both leglocks and to reverse into dominant positions from the bottom.

In training or sparring, leglocks are applied in a slow and controlled manner, and are often not hyperextended such as in the case of the comparatively dangerous heel hook. Instead, submission is signalled before the lock is fully applied. In self-defense application, or when applied improperly or with excessive force, leglocks can cause muscle, tendon and ligament damage, even dislocation or bone fractures.

Some examples of the many types of leglocks are found below.

== Kneebar ==
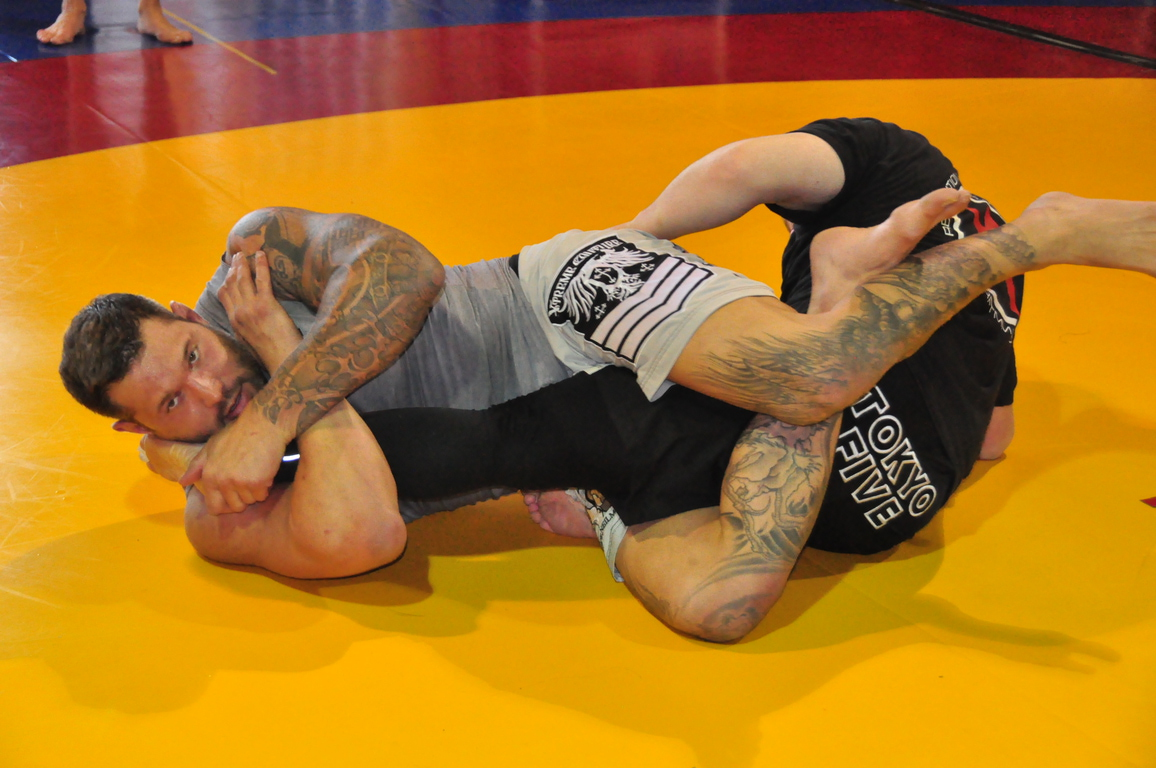
A kneebar is performed on the leg similarly to how the armbar is performed on the arm.

A kneebar (also known as legbar, kneelock or hiza-juji-gatame) is a leglock that can hyperextend the knee. The basic kneebar technique is similar to that of an armbar. The practitioner will trap the opponent's leg in between their legs and secure the leg with their arms so the opponent's kneecap points towards the body. The practitioner then applies pressure with their hips, forcing the opponent's leg to straighten, hyperextending the knee joint. A variation of the kneebar is similarly accomplished, but instead of holding the leg with the hands, the practitioner will trap the opponent's foot behind one armpit. The practitioner will then apply pressure using their upper body as well and their hips, yielding a greater amount of force applied to the knee, therefore rendering the lock much more difficult to escape before tissue or ligament damage occurs. Alternatively, if the practitioner is gripping low enough with both hands on the ankle and calf/shin of the opponent, the practitioner can cross one leg over and use it to press down as a leg triangle around the opponent's knee/thigh/patella/femur, making the hold more secure and allowing the practitioner to strike the opponent's groin or pin down/push away the opponent's other leg with the practitioner's non-crossed leg.

A variation of the kneebar known as the Suloev Stretch arises from the back control position, often as the opponent stands with one or both hands on the mat, thus placing their ankle within reach. The opponent's ankle is pulled toward his own shoulder, effecting a tearing pressure on the hamstring of the isolated leg, hyper-extending the knee, and applying rotational pressure to the hip joint.

== Ankle lock ==
An ankle lock (occasionally referred to as a shin lock) is a leglock that is applied to any of the joints in the ankle, typically by hyperextending the talocrural joint through plantar hyperflexion. Ankle locks are often applied in a manner which simultaneously causes a compression lock to the achilles tendon, and sometimes also to the calf muscle.

=== Straight ankle lock ===
The straight ankle lock (depending on how it is performed is known in judo as an akiresuken-gatame or ashi-hishigi) is what is usually thought of as an ankle lock. It is typically performed using the legs to isolate one of the opponent's legs, and placing the opponent's foot in the armpit, while holding the foot with the forearm at the lower part of the opponent's calf, usually at the achilles tendon. By leveraging the hips forward, the foot becomes forcefully plantar flexed, hence creating a potent joint lock on the ankle. The forearm serves as a fulcrum in the leveraging, and may cause severe pressure on the achilles tendon, especially when the bony parts of the forearm are used. Such a straight ankle lock is sometimes referred to as an "achilles lock".

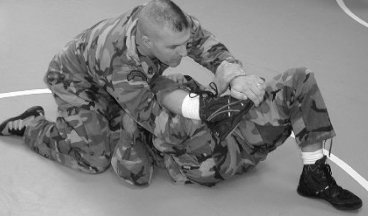
A figure-four toe hold.

=== Toe hold ===
A toe hold (also known as ashi-dori-garami in judo) involves using the hands to hyperextend and/or hyperrotate the ankle, typically by grabbing the foot near the toes, and twisting or pushing the foot while controlling the opponent's leg. A common type of toe hold is the figure-four toe hold, where a figure-four hold is used to hold the opponent's foot. This type of toe hold is performed by holding the foot by the toes with one hand, and putting the other hand under the opponent's achilles tendon, and grabbing the wrist. By controlling the opponent's body, and using the hands to plantar flex the foot either straight or slightly sideways, hence putting considerable torque on the ankle. The toe hold can also be applied in a similar position as an ankle lock.

== Heel hook ==
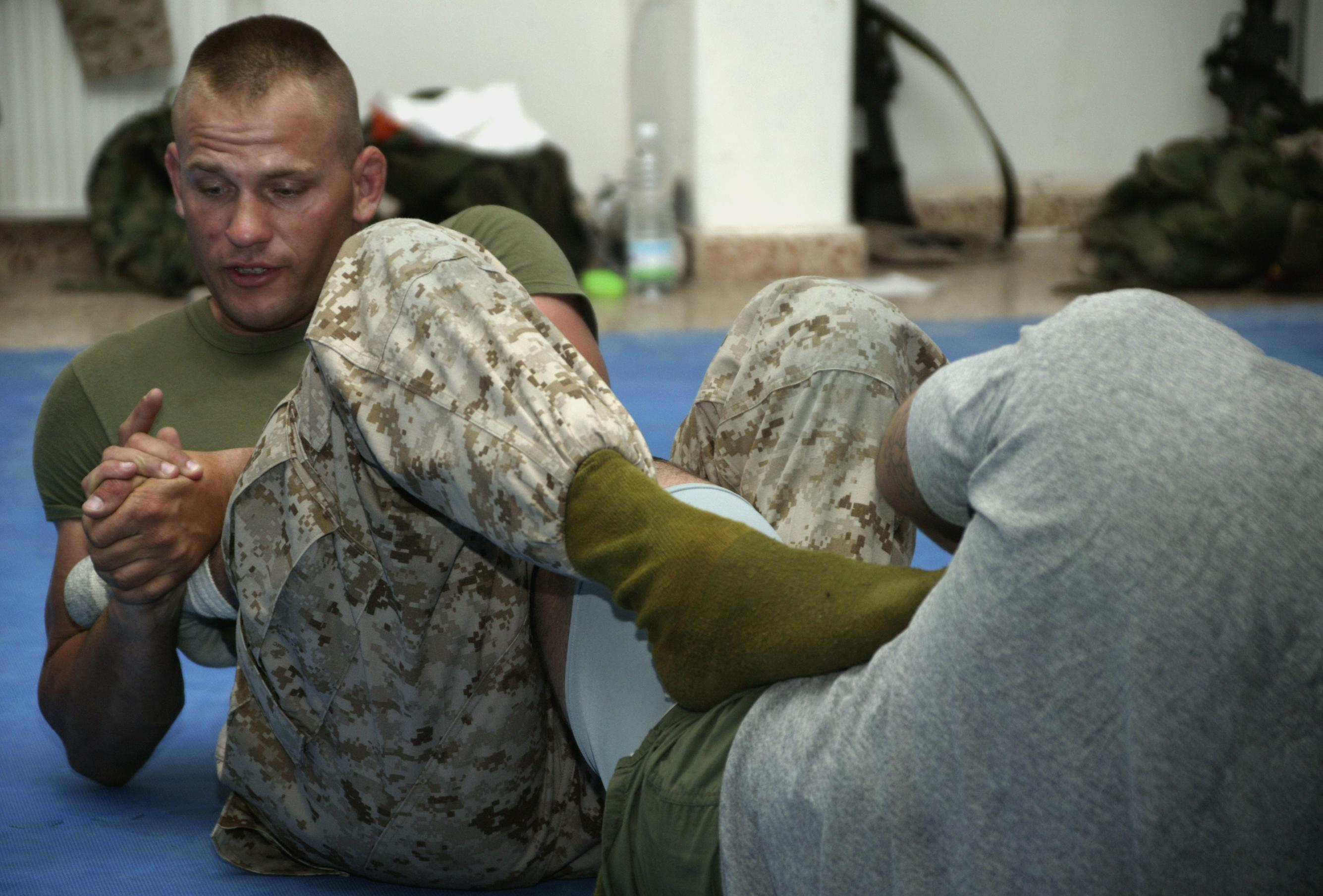
The regular heel hook twists the ankle medially. The opponent's leg is entangled to prevent him from escaping the hold.

A heel hook is a leg lock affecting multiple joints, and is applied by transversely twisting the foot either medially or laterally. The torsional force puts severe torque on the ankle, which in turn transfers torque to the knee.

There are several variations of heel hooks, with the most typical being performed by placing the legs around a leg of an opponent, and holding the opponent's foot in the armpit on the same side. The legs are used to control the movement of the opponent's body while the opponent's foot is twisted by holding the heel with the forearm, and using the whole body to generate a twisting motion, hence creating severe medial torque on the ankle. A similar heel hook can be performed by holding the opponent's foot in the opposite armpit, and twisting it laterally; a move which is referred to as an inverted, reverse or inside heel hook.

Many practitioners considered the heel hook to be a dangerous leg lock, with a high rate of injury, especially to ligaments in the knee. As a result, many popular figures in the grappling world do not believe that heel hooks should be taught to beginners. Despite being a very old technique, the heel hook is illegal in many forms of competitive grappling and was at one point completely banned in Brazilian jiu-jitsu under IBJJF rules, but this was changed for advanced competitors as of 2021. Today there are several exceptions to this, most notably the advanced categories of competition Brazilian jiu-jitsu and Sambo.

== Calf crush ==
A calf crush or calf slicer (also known as calf cutter, knee slicer, or knee separator), known in judo as hiza-hishigi, is a technique wherein one compresses their opponent's leg (heel to butt) while placing one's forearm or shin behind the knee to crush the calf muscle while potentially separating the knee joint. As with biceps slicers, there is a common misconception that this technique causes only pain. Calf locks can cause very serious injuries to the knee as well as damaging the calf muscle, and caution should be a priority when finishing the lock.

== See also ==
- For leglocks involving a separating motion of the knee, see Leg slicer.
- Armlock
- Small joint manipulation
- Spinal lock
- Wristlock
- Compression lock
