= Thigh strap =

A thigh strap or thigh band may refer to:

- any kind of strap that is worn around the thigh, either as a single item or as part of another piece of clothing, such as a thigh holster
- a garter, a clothing item used to keep stockings up
