= Armlock =

Martial arts technique

- Classification: Joint-lock
- Parent hold: Various grappling positions
- Child hold(s): Wristlock

An armlock in grappling is a single or double joint lock that hyperextends, hyperflexes or hyperrotates the elbow joint or shoulder joint. An armpit lock can be useful; it will immobilize an opponent and pin them on the ground. An armlock that hyperextends the elbow is known as an armbar, and it includes the traditional armbar (pressing the elbow against the thigh or hips), the shoulder triangle armbar (where a figure-four is locked with the legs), and the shotgun armbar (where the opponent's wrist is placed in the armpit, using the forearm as a fulcrum). An armlock that hyper-rotates the arm is known as an armcoil, and includes the Americana, kimura, and omoplata. Depending on the joint flexibility of a person, armcoils can either hyperrotate only the shoulder joint, only the elbow joint, or both the elbow joint and shoulder joint.

Obtaining an armlock requires effective use of full-body leverage in order to initiate and secure a lock on the targeted arm, while preventing the opponent from escaping the lock. Therefore, performing an armlock is less problematic on the ground, from positions such as the mount, side control, or guard. Armlocks are more difficult to perform when both combatants are standing up, though the stand-up variants are a focus in certain systems such as Chin Na.

Armlocks, considered less dangerous techniques in combat sports allowing joint locks, are the most common joint locks used as submission holds. In training, the method of executing an armlock is generally slow and controlled to give the opponent time to submit prior to any infliction of injury. However, in self-defense applications, or when applied improperly or with excessive force, armlocks can cause muscle, tendon and ligament damage, even dislocation, or bone fractures.

== Armbar ==
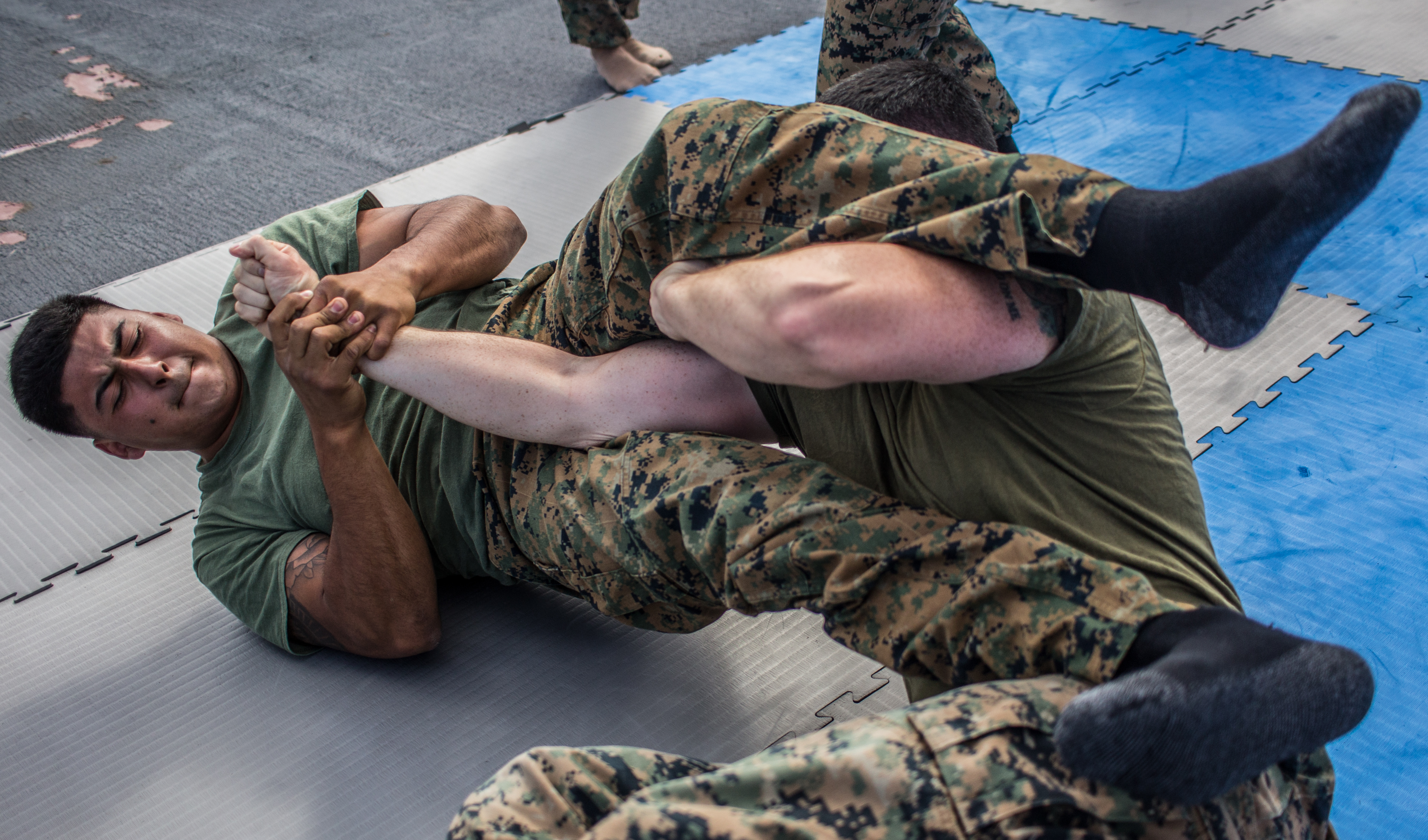
Armbar counter on the ground normally is a body roll towards the opponent in order to prevent overextension of the captured elbow bend

The jūji-gatame (十字固め, rendered as "ude-hishigi-juji-gatame"), which translates to "cross pin" or "cross hold down" also sometimes used interchangeably with the terms armbar, cross armbar or straight armbar, is a Jujutsu, and thus a Judo, technique also widely used in other grappling martial arts such as Brazilian jiu-jitsu (BJJ). The English word "bar" is used here to signify the opponent's extended arm, while the Japanese term "jūji" (十字) describes the crossed arms by referencing kanji character shape, similar to how "jūjika" (十字架) describes crucifixion. In general, the practitioner secures an arm at the wrist of the opponent, trapping it by squeezing the knees together. To initiate the submission one of the legs will be across the chest of the opponent, the second leg's calf will cross face the opponent, with the hips tight into the armpit, with the arm held between the thighs, with the elbow pointing against the thigh or hips. By holding the opponent's wrist to the attacker's chest with the pinky finger on the sternum and the thumb facing up (arm semi-supinated or semi-pronated), the practitioner can easily extend the opponent's arm and hyperextend the opponent's elbow. The attacker can further increase the pressure on the elbow joint by arching his hips against the elbow. Alternatively, gripping the opponent's wrist and forearm, while pushing the hips closer to the opponent's elbow and crossing one leg to make a leg triangle around and press down the opponent's humerus/scapula/biceps and triceps/shoulder, could make the hold more secure while additionally allowing the practitioner to deliver strikes to the opponent's head and neck with the non-crossed leg. This technique is used in various grappling martial arts, including but not limited to Brazilian jiu-jitsu, catch wrestling, judo, jujutsu, Sambo, and shoot wrestling, and is reportedly at least 200 years old.

=== Flying armbar ===
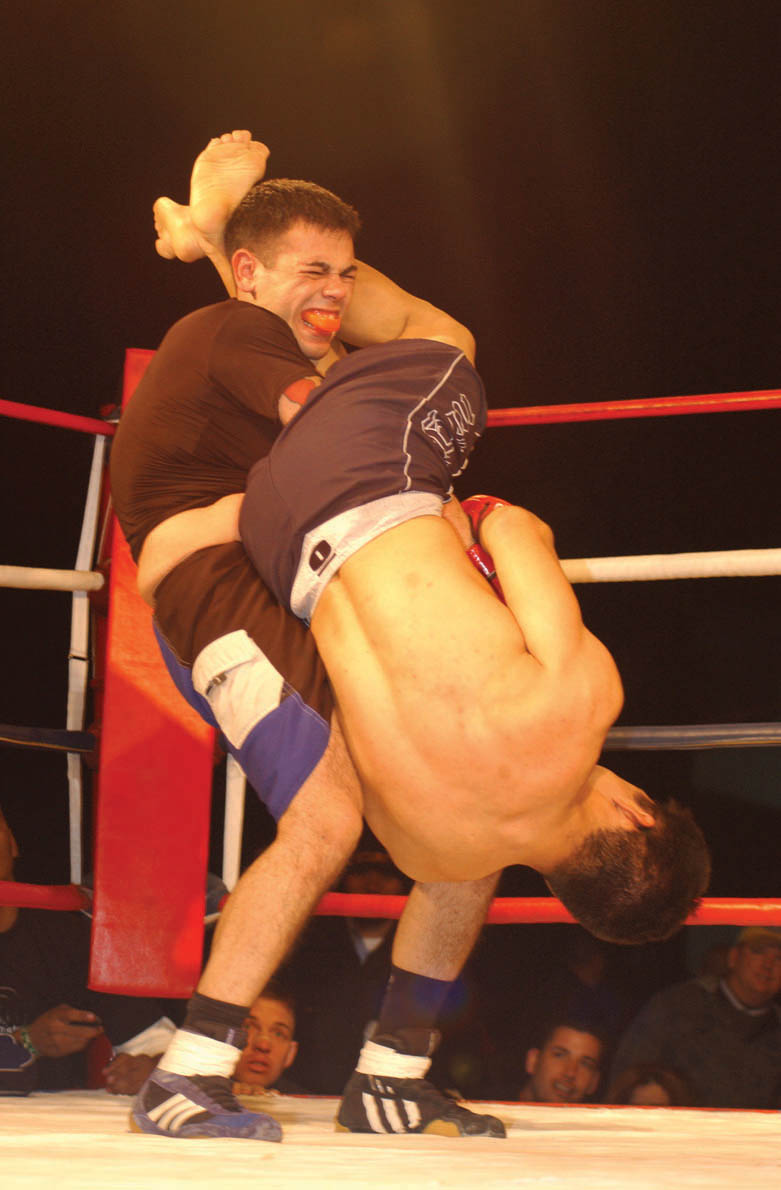
A fighter attempts to escape from an armbar by slamming the opponent to the ground.

The flying armbar or tobi-jūji-gatame (飛び十字固め) is a version of the jūji-gatame that is performed from a stand-up position. Without a gi, it is typically applied when the opponent has a collar tie and arm control. By tightly holding the opponent's neck and arm, the practitioner places one of his shins against the opponent's midsection, and leans up on the opponent; at the same time, the attacker swings the leg on the same side as the opponent's collar tie over the opponent's head, into the typical jūji-gatame position. A slight modification of this maneuver can also be made. Instead of initiating the move by placing the shin against the opponent's midsection, the lower leg can be directed through the space between the arm and trunk of the opponent with the knee generally placed close to the opponent's armpit. The advantage of this modification is that the attacking practitioner's hips more closely engage with the defender's shoulders, making the forthcoming armbar submission easier to accomplish. However, the disadvantage of this modification is that the associated risk of injury is increased due to the attacker's increased height above the ground and near-vertical upside-down angle to the ground. (With a gi, it can be performed without needing to hold the neck.) If improperly performed, this technique can allow the opponent to escape, and gain an advantageous position. The flying armbar is considered to be one of the most visually spectacular joint locks, but it is uncommon because of the associated risk of falling into a poor position.

=== Helicopter armbar ===
The helicopter armbar is a slightly different version of the armbar, a combination of an armbar and tomoe nage, which is also used by wrestling, Judo and BJJ. When the attacker stands in front of the opponent, he grabs both of his arms and falls backwards, causing the opponent to lean forward. Then the attacker puts his feet on the opponent's stomach or hips and lifts him up with his feet. While securing one of the opponents arms, the attacker will drop one foot (Same side as the secured arm). This will cause the opponent to twist and fall, landing with the secured arm extended by the attacker.

=== Sankaku-gatame ===
The sankaku-gatame (三角固め) or triangle armlock is a jūji-gatame performed from the sankaku position. It is normally used when the shime (strangle) is not working. It is an effective competition technique because the opponent's arm became exposed while defending the sankaku-jime and their attention is focused in stopping the strangle.

== Shoulder locks ==
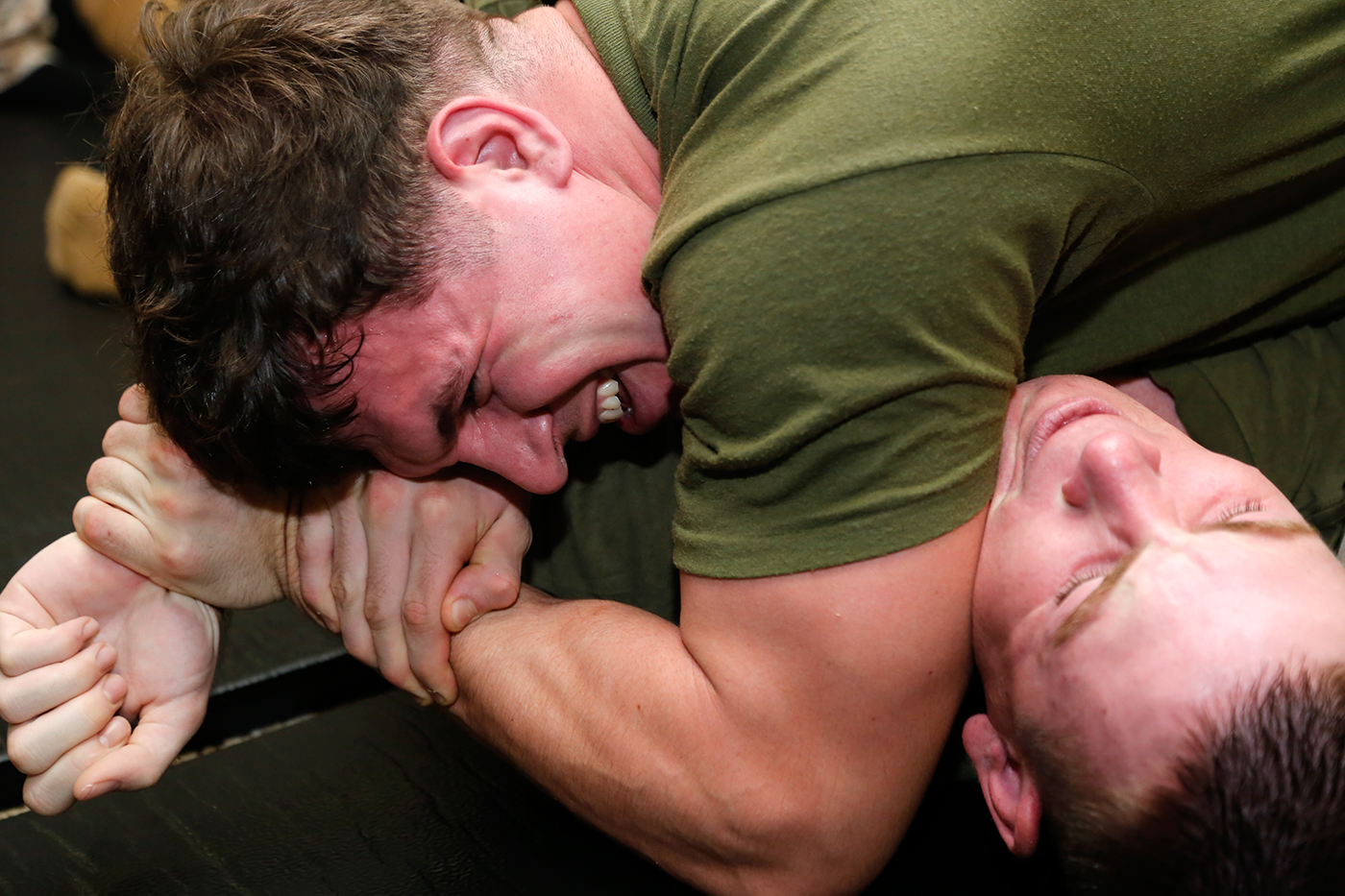
Standard americana execution

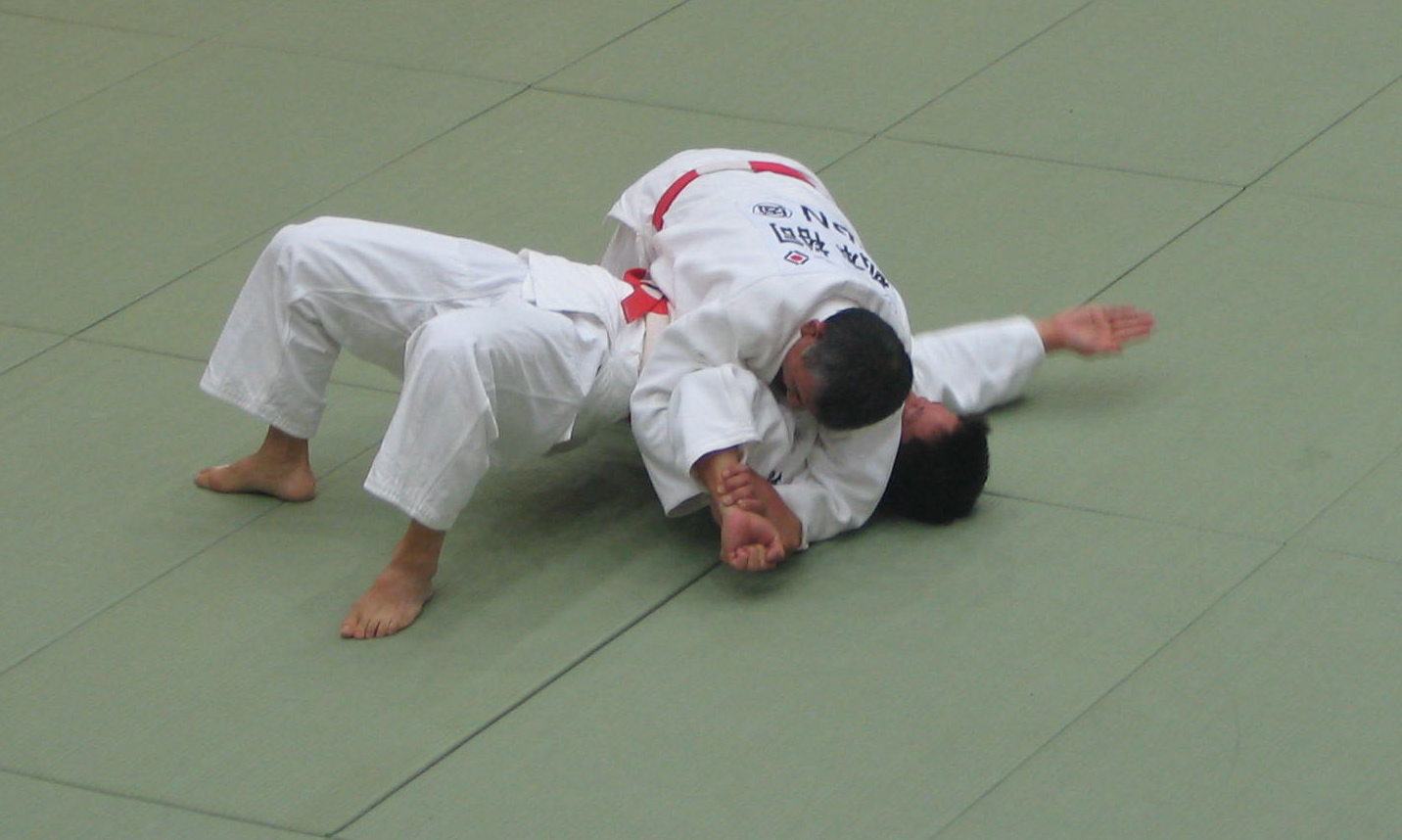
Ude-garami (Americana) being attempted in Judo kata

The "shoulder lock" is a technique used as a method of upper body restraint. It should not be confused with a choke because the lock does not block or interfere with the flow of air or oxygen to the brain. The application is executed by applying pressure between the radial bone and shoulder.

=== Top shoulder lock ===
The top shoulder lock, (Also known as the figure-four armlock, bent armlock, Americana, keylock, V1 armlock, paintbrush, or ude-garami) is a grappling keylock technique in which both of the practitioner's arms isolate and cause flexion to the shoulder, elbow, and to a lesser extent the wrist of the opponent. The technique is generally set in motion by the practitioner, using their opposite side hand (i.e. to target the opponents' right hand he uses his own left hand), pinning the opponent's arm to the ground at the wrist, so that the elbow falls at a right angle with the palm facing upwards. Subsequently, the practitioner will thread his opposite hand under the opponent's biceps, reach through and grasp his own wrist. Doing so creates the signature "figure four", from which one name for this technique was derived. This also gives the practitioner a mechanical advantage over the opponent. To finish the submission the practitioner slides the wrist of the opponent toward the lower body, while simultaneously elevating the elbow and forearm, in a motion resembling using a paintbrush, creating opposition to the joints and causing the necessary flexion in the shoulder and elbow to cause significant pain, and damage if the opponent fails to submit. While it is feasible to execute this technique from several different positions, the most commonly utilized is the side mount position. This technique also has numerous variations with their own nomenclature, for instance depending on the rotational direction the arm, the addition of the word "reverse" signifying medial rotation as in reverse keylock or reverse ude-garami, in which case the usage of "keylock" indicates lateral rotation only.

An illustration of Standing Ude-garami (Americana)

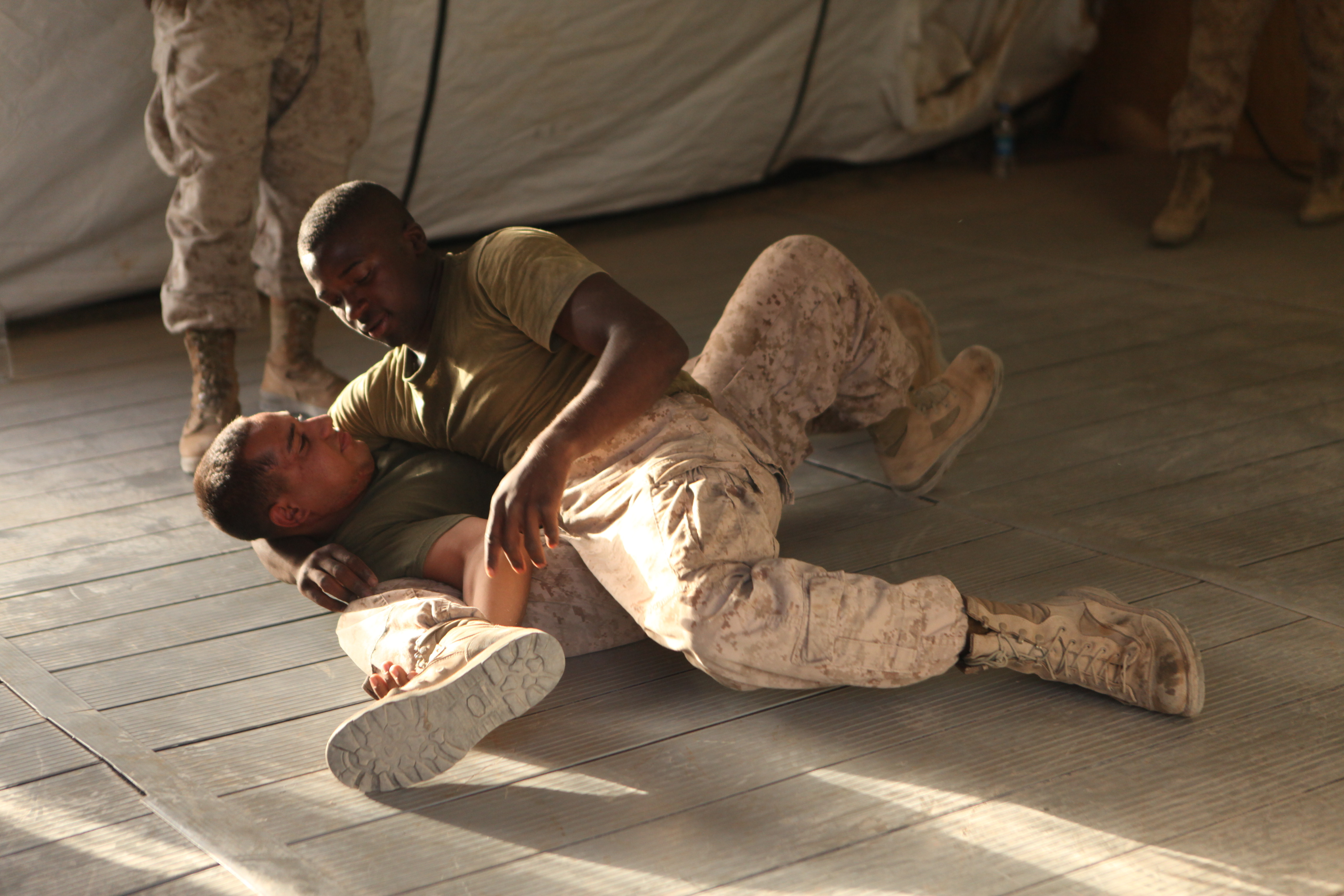
Unorthodox Americana shoulder lock applied using a leg (ude hishigi hiza gatame)

=== Double wristlock ===
Double wristlock/chicken wing (catch wrestling), kimura (Brazilian Jiu-Jitsu), or reverse keylock are terms used to specify a medial keylock known in judo as gyaku ude-garami (reverse arm entanglement) or simply as ude-garami. The application is similar to the top wristlock, except that it is reversed. It needs some space behind the opponent to be effective, and can be applied from the side control or guard. Contrary to the top wristlock, the opponent's wrist is grabbed with the hand on the same side, and the opposite arm is put behind the opponent's arm, again grabbing the attacker's wrist and forming a figure-four. By controlling the opponent's body and cranking the arm away from the attacker, pressure is put on the shoulder joint, and depending on the angle, also the elbow joint (in some variations the opponent's arm is brought behind their back, resulting in a finishing position resembling that of the hammerlock outlined below).

The name "kimura" started circulating in Brazil after a judoka and a professional wrestler, Masahiko Kimura, used it to defeat one of the founders of Brazilian Jiu-Jitsu, Hélio Gracie. This variation of the name gained more prominence in MMA after the introduction of UFC, and the role Gracie had in its early history. Although a top wristlock is technically a reverse double wristlock, UFC announcer Bruce Buffer still announces fights won by top wristlock as "by tap-out due to a kimura".

The double wristlock is considered in catch wrestling to be the bread-and-butter part of their style. Professional wrestler Terry Funk credits Lorigo "Tony" Morelli with introducing the hold to wrestling "in the '20s", and expressed light frustration with the term "kimura" gradually replacing "double wristlock". He says Morelli set it up by giving opponents (either in fixed matches or legitimate challenges) his back, while standing, throughout his thirty-year career. A reporter for The Spokesman-Review used the term in June 1925 to describe a submission by Jim "Cyclone Thompson" Corrigan over the deputy sheriff of Worley, Idaho, without elaborating on the mechanics. The Wichita Eagle did likewise that April, for Dick Daviscourt's first fall on strongman Henry "Milo" Steinborn.

The 1928 National Collegiate Athletic Association rulebook noted, "Attention is called to the fact that if the double wristlock is brought up to a twisting hammerlock, it becomes an illegal hold and must be stopped by the Referee...". Elsewhere, it prohibits preventing an opponent from escaping with a bodylock, with low-quality photographic illustration. It also noted concern for the danger of a legally applied double wristlock. Robin Reed had used the move to force pins on his way to an Olympic gold medal in 1924.

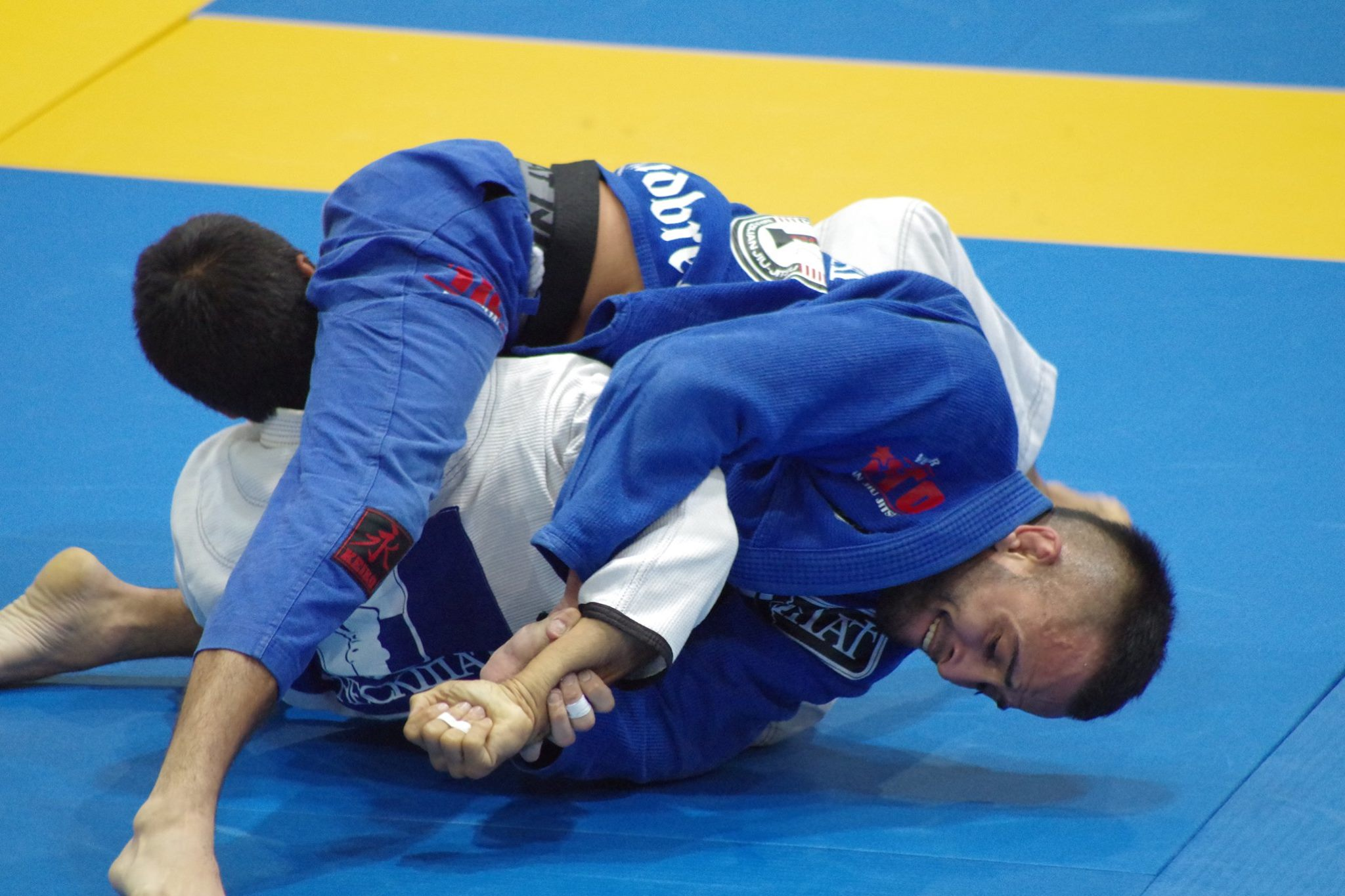
Double wristlock (Kimura lock)

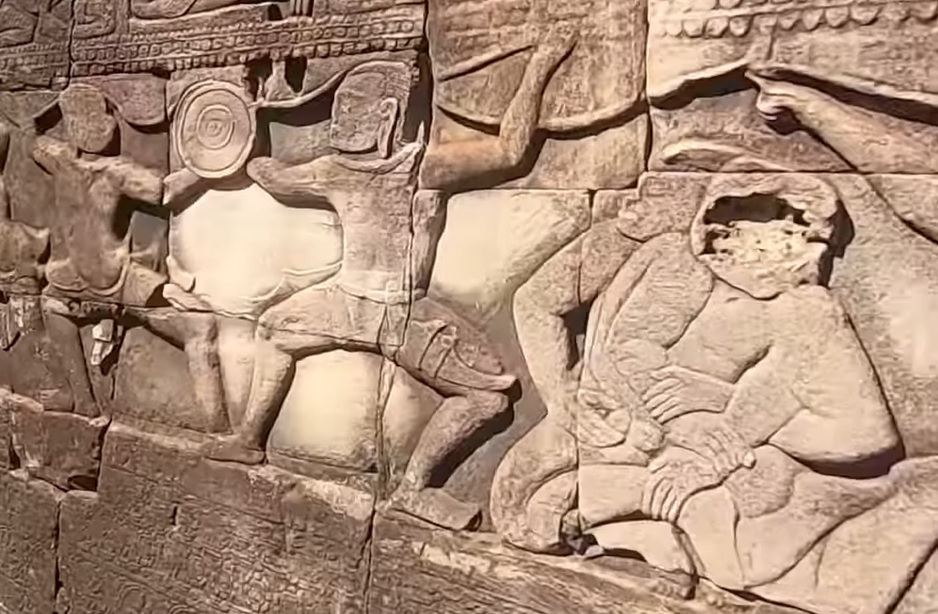
Double wristlock bas-relief depicted on the right from the Khmer Empire's 800-year-old Bayon temple

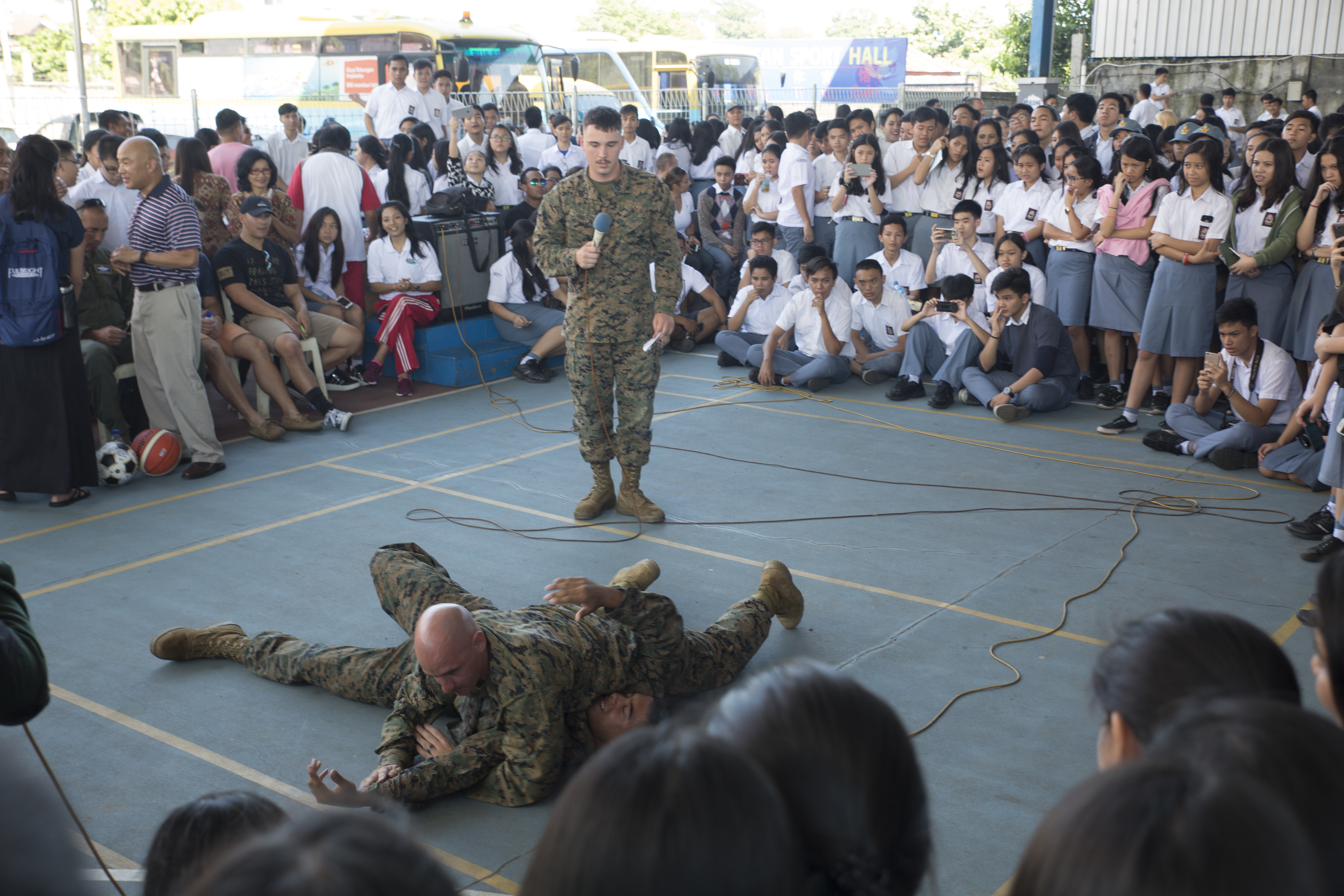
Double wristlock armbar version on the ground

=== Omoplata ===
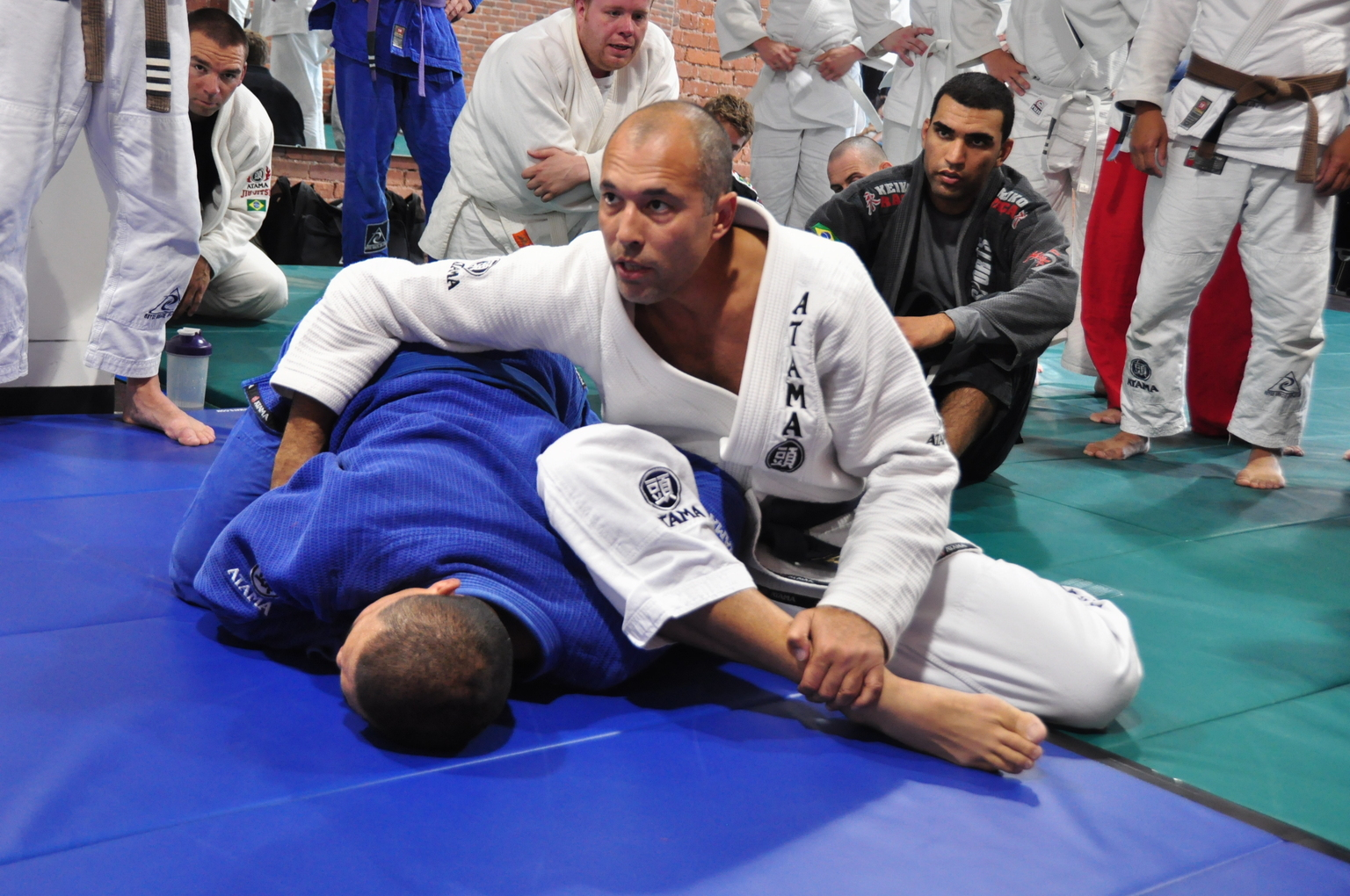
Royce Gracie demonstrating the Omoplata.

The omoplata (referred to in judo as ashi-sankaku-garami, 脚三角緘, "triangular entanglement" and in catch wrestling as coil lock) is another bent arm shoulder lock. The locking mechanism is similar to the kimura bent arm lock, but instead of using a figure-four, it is applied using a leg. The omoplata can be applied from the guard, by placing one leg under the opponent's armpit and turning 180 degrees in the direction of that leg, so that the leg moves over the back of the opponent and entangles the opponent's arm. By controlling the opponent's body and pushing the arm perpendicularly away from the opponent's back, pressure can be put on the opponent's shoulder. It is also possible to put pressure on the elbow joint by bending the leg entangling the arm, and twisting it in a specific manner. In order to secure the opponent and prevent him from rolling out of the lock, the inner arm can be thrown over the opponent's waist as a "seatbelt" securing the opponent. Though an effective lock, it is more difficult than other armlocks to successfully apply. The technique called a monoplata is a similar armlock that resembles jūji-gatame or spiderweb position yet has a mechanism like an omoplata.

Tsunetane Oda, a judo groundwork specialist who died in 1955, was shown on video to have demonstrated the technique.

=== Hammerlock ===
A hammerlock is a shoulder lock similar to the double wristlock where the opponent's arm is held bent against their back, and their hand forced upwards towards the neck, thereby applying pressure to the shoulder joint. This version of the rotational armlock has been present in wrestling circles for centuries and its earliest appearance is in a 16th-century German book detailing techniques for European wrestling.

== See also ==
- For armlocks involving a separating motion of the elbow joint, see Biceps slicer
- Leglock
- Small joint manipulation
- Spinal lock
- Wristlock
