= Submission (combat sports) =

Type of grappling hold

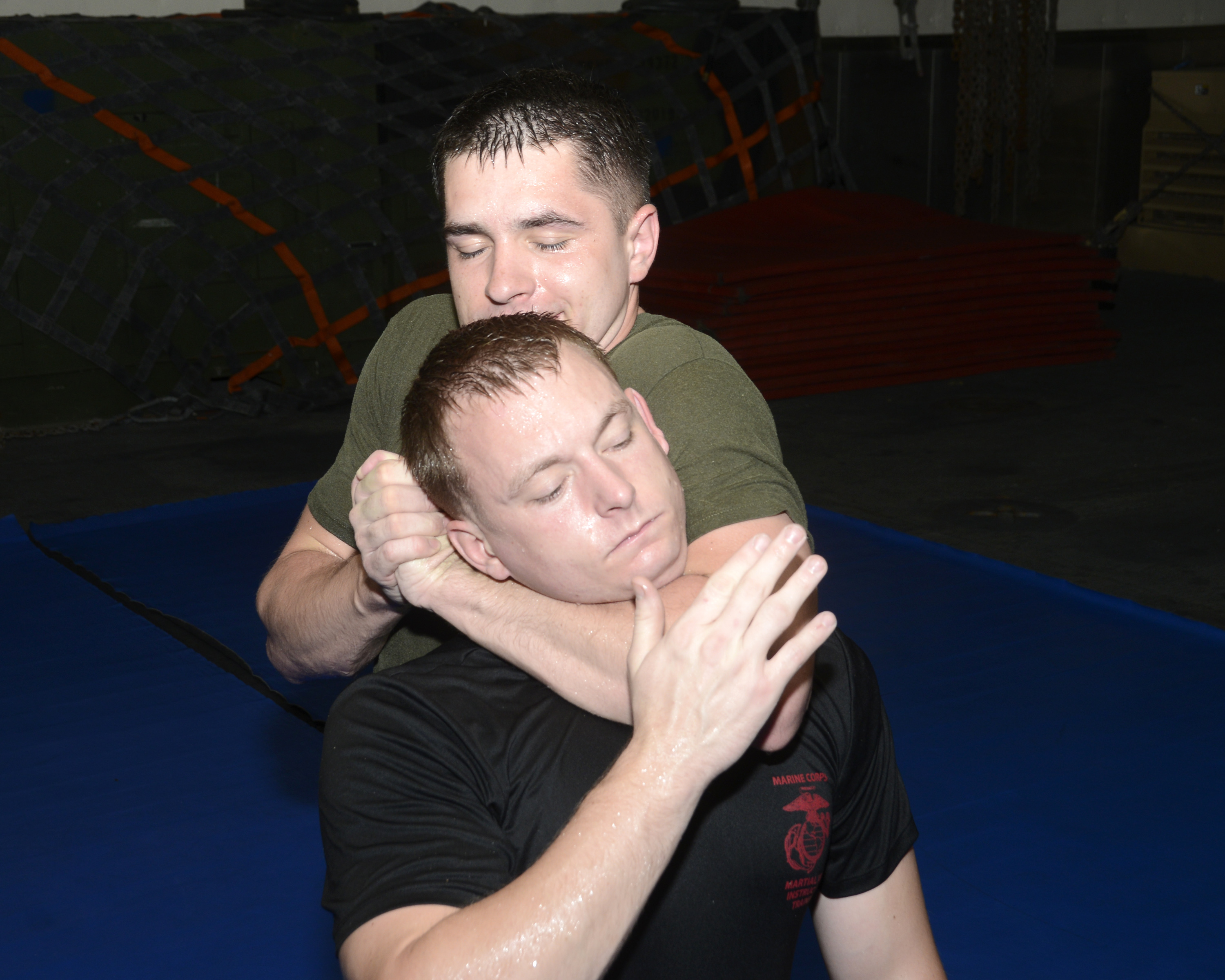
Submissions are often indicated in grappling by tapping the opponent with the hand, or verbally submitting to the opponent or official.

A submission, also called a "tap out" is a combat sports term for yielding to the opponent, resulting in an immediate defeat. A submission is often performed by visibly tapping the floor or opponent with the hand or foot, or by verbalizing to the opponent or referee of the competition. In combative sports where the fighter has cornermen, the cornerman can also stop the fight by "throwing in the towel" (either by literally throwing in a towel or by verbalizing to the official), which may count as a submission.

To force a submission a fighter must do a submission hold, of which there are two categories. The first is a joint lock, which can include armlocks, americanas, anklelocks, kneebars, etc. These submissions damage the joints by hyperextending and threatening to break them. Secondly there are chokeholds. These include the rear naked choke, guillotine choke, triangle choke, etc. These prevent air flow to the lungs or blood flow to the brain, risking the fighter to go unconscious.

== Technical submission ==
A technical submission or "stoppage" may occur when the referee stops the fight for any reason, including because a fighter has sustained a serious injury like a broken limb or is rendered unconscious. An example would be a fighter's arm breaking in an armbar, or a fighter going unconscious in a rear naked choke. In both cases the fighter is unable to tap out, and safely continue the fight. Such a match outcome may be called a technical submission or a technical knockout (TKO) depending on the rules of the match. In the UFC, a submission to strikes also counts as a technical knockout.

== In professional wrestling ==
In professional wrestling, a submission can be used to gain a fall and/or win the match (depending on the match's ruleset/stipulation). A submission is either earned when a wrestler taps the mat or their opponent three or more times with their hand, or verbalizes to the referee (often using the phrase "I quit"). Due to pro wrestling's choreographed nature, limbs are not broken as to protect the wrestler in the hold. To force the breaking of the hold (unless in a match with a no disqualification/no rope-break rule) a wrestler can touch the ring ropes or place part of their body directly under them, the referee will then count to 5, and if the wrestler executing the submission hold does not let go they will be disqualified. Many wrestlers create their own (or use pre-existing) submissions as their "finishing move", often with a unique name to fit the wrestler's gimmick. Examples include Ric Flair's figure four leglock, Chris Jericho's Walls of Jericho (a variation of the Boston crab), Bret Hart's sharpshooter, and Roman Reigns' guillotine choke.

== See also ==
- Submission hold
- Submission wrestling
