= Criss Angel Believe (TV series) =

- Promotional poster
- Created by: Criss Angel
- Directed by: Criss Angel
- Starring: Criss Angel
- Country of origin: United States
- No. of episodes: 10 + 1 unaired

Production
- Editors: Ben Le Vine, Chip Brown, David Milhous
- Running time: 41 minutes (without commercials)

Original release
- Network: Spike
- Release: October 8 – December 10, 2013

Criss Angel BeLIEve is an American reality docusoap starring illusionist Criss Angel. Premiering October 8, 2013 on Spike as a successor to his previous A&E series Criss Angel Mindfreak, it followed Criss performing large-scale illusion stunts and street magic acts, including behind-the-scenes footage showing the development and execution of his illusions.

== Production ==
In January 2013, Spike announced that it had ordered a new 11-episode Criss Angel docuseries to premiere later in the year; Spike's EVP of original programming Sharon Levy stated that the series would offer "never-before-granted access into the inner-workings of [Angel's] secret world and his mind."

The series—later announced as Criss Angel BeLIEve—was scheduled to premiere in October 2013, coinciding with the fifth anniversary of Criss Angel's Luxor Las Vegas stage show Criss Angel Believe. Having been three years since the conclusion of his previous show Mindfreak, Criss remarked that "I missed being on television, I had something new creatively to say, and Spike became the perfect home to do it." Unlike Mindfreak, each episode was produced as a standalone story with a different theme, which Criss said would allow the show to be more "diverse" and unpredictable.

BeLIEve was primarily filmed in Las Vegas, including at a "think tank" where Angel's team develops his tricks and illusions. One episode—in which Criss would escape from two straitjackets while hanging upside-down with a weight hanging from his neck—was filmed in his hometown of New York City. Criss stated that he wanted to see if it were possible "to take the historical references of what Houdini had done and kind of catapult it into today", and that part of his preparations for the stunt included being choked out by MMA fighter Randy Couture to understand the feeling of choking.

In May 2013, Las Vegas magician Jan Rouven accused Criss of plagiarizing an illusion from his Riviera show for one of the episodes; the illusion was billed by Criss as being inspired by a scene from Clive Barker's film Lord of Illusions, but Rouven found that beyond this premise, the performance was nearly identical to his "Bed of Death" illusion. Criss subsequently accused Rouven of performing other magicians' tricks without permission (an accusation denied by Rouven's manager), explaining that "I go out of my way to get people’s permission. I deal with this on a much larger level than any of these people. Do you think I would really need to do something like that?"

== Broadcast ==
BeLIEve premiered October 8, 2013 on Spike, following the Ink Master season 3 finale. It moved to its regular Tuesday-night timeslot beginning October 15.

The series was originally scheduled to air a live finale from Las Vegas entitled "Trinity", where Angel would have attempted to perform a three-part illusion under a time limit before something "detonate[s] inches away from me." However, after tearing his shoulder tendons during the double straitjacket stunt, Angel suspended his Las Vegas performances for several months while preparing for a surgery in January 2014.

== Episodes ==
No.	Title	Original release date
1	"Cement Grave"	October 8, 2013
Criss attempts a performance in which he would be buried alive in a cement grave.
2	"Blind"	October 15, 2013
Criss attempts to walk across a swinging I-beam blindfolded above a crowd.
3	"Bullet Catch"	October 22, 2013
Criss attempts the well-known bullet catch trick.
4	"Raise the Dead"	October 29, 2013
Criss attempts to raise someone back from the dead.
5	"Levitate Shaq"	November 5, 2013
Criss hangs out with Shaquille O'Neal, and prepares a performance in which he attempts to levitate him.
6	"Alligator Torture Escape"	November 12, 2013
In Miami, Criss attempts a never-before-completed "trapeze alligator escape", freeing himself from a stockade and shackles suspended over a pool of alligators.
7	"Lord Of Illusions"	November 19, 2013
Criss attempts a demonstration inspired by the film Lord of Illusions in which he must predict the order that audience members will release five swords suspended over him, in order to escape before a sixth sword impales his chest.
8	"Double Straight Jacket"	November 25, 2013
In an homage to Houdini, Criss attempts to escape from two straitjackets before he is choked out by a 45-pound weight tied around his neck.
9	"Elephant Herd Vanish"	December 3, 2013
Criss attempts to make an entire herd of elephants disappear; Criss conducts illusions at a toy store.
10	"Ship Appearance"	December 10, 2013
While on a working vacation to Cabo San Lucas, Criss attempts the largest-scale appearance act he had ever attempted.
11	"Trinity"	unaired

== See also ==
- List of Criss Angel Mindfreak episodes
