= Body triangle (grappling) =

Grappling technique

Body Triangle
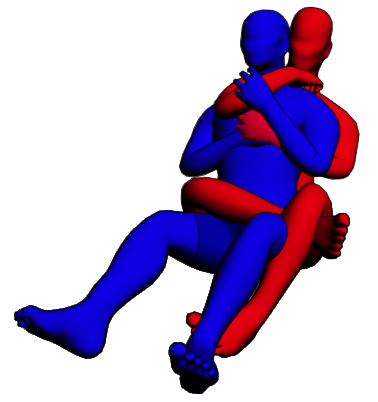
- this diagram shows the red figure executing a body triangle against the blue figure
- Classification: Grappling
- Style: Judo, Brazilian jiu-jitsu
- AKA: Figure-four body lock
- Parent hold: Back mount, hooks

A body triangle (also known as a figure-four body lock) is a technique in grappling that is employed from the back, back mount, or less frequently from the closed guard, whose purpose is to securely lock the practitioner's opponent in position. This technique is very similar to one of the four forbidden techniques in judo, the do-jime or trunk hold. The main characteristic of the body triangle that distinguishes it from hooks is the commitment to the position, i.e. once executed the position is difficult to escape. However, it also severely limits the offensive options of the practitioner employing it.

== Technique ==
Execution is achieved by first crossing the ankles, grasping the heel of one foot and pulling that foot into the opposite knee, this creates the signature “4” shape for which the figure-four gets its name. As a secondary effect, it creates a significant amount of pressure against the ribs of the practitioner's opponent, hindering normal breathing and perpetuating swift fatigue. If executed with enough force, the resulting trauma to the ribcage can be substantial, in some cases even causing compressive asphyxia.

== Offensive options ==
=== Submission options ===
The most predominant submission attack associated with the body triangle is the rear naked choke. The resultant limited ability of the opponent to gain breath during the body lock compounds the effectiveness of the chokehold significantly, making this the ideal attack. Other attacks include variations on the neck crank, wrist locks and shoulder locks, but have a considerably lower percentage of success. The Body Triangle itself will sometimes cause an opponent to submit, however this tends to be less frequent due to the relatively high level of conditioning most practitioners of grappling arts possess.

=== Striking options ===
Due to the somewhat secure nature of the position, striking from the body triangle position has the potential to be advantageous; it gives the practitioner a stable platform from which to mount offensive strikes, especially to the head, and leaves little opportunity for escape. However, from a combat sport standpoint some of these striking techniques, especially attacks to the back of the head, are unallowable due to the considerable risk they pose to the practitioners.

== Defensive options ==
In order to escape or reverse the body triangle the first priority is to unlock the figure-four; this can be quite difficult depending on the skill of the practitioner performing the technique, and consequently often leaves a practitioner vulnerable to attack, either by striking or submission. Striking options are also severely limited when a practitioner is subject to a body-lock, the most common being a rear elbow strike to the head of the opponent.

== See also ==
- Back mount
- Figure-four
- Hooks
- Triangle choke
