= Criss Angel =

American magician, illusionist and musician (born 1967)

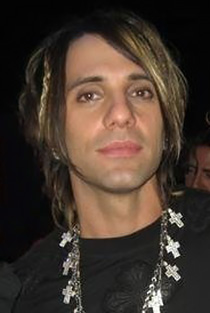
- Angel in 2010
- Born: Christopher Nicholas Sarantakos; December 19, 1967 (age 58); Hempstead, New York, US
- Occupations: Magician, entertainer, musician, TV personality
- Years active: 1994–present
- Spouse: JoAnn Winkhart (m. 2002–2005)
- Partner: Shaunyl Benson (2012–present)
- Children: 3
- Website: crissangel.com

Christopher Nicholas Sarantakos (born December 19, 1967), known professionally as Criss Angel, is an American magician, illusionist and musician.

Angel began his career in New York City, before moving his base of operations to the Las Vegas Valley. He is known for starring in the hit television show Criss Angel Mindfreak and the stage show Criss Angel MINDFREAK LIVE! (previously Criss Angel Believe) at the Luxor casino in Las Vegas. Following his departure from The Luxor after a decade-long run, Angel opened the new MINDFREAK show in the Criss Angel Theater at Planet Hollywood in Las Vegas. He also produced and starred in the TV series Criss Angel's Magic with the Stars on CW, Criss Angel BeLIEve on Spike TV, a one-hour special Trick'd on A&E, and the reality competition show Phenomenon on NBC.

He also holds multiple world records made during his magic performances, and was named Magician of the Decade in 2009, Magician of the Century in 2010 by the International Magicians Society. In 2017, he received a star on the Hollywood Walk of Fame. Vanish magazine awarded him the "Greatest of All Time" award in 2019. In addition to his career as an illusionist, Angel was the lead singer for his industrial band Angeldust, which released five albums. He also authored the book Mindfreak: Secret Revelations.

== Early life ==
Criss Angel was born on December 19, 1967, at Hempstead General Hospital in Hempstead, on Long Island, New York. He is of Greek descent. Angel was raised in Elmont until fourth grade, when his family moved to East Meadow, New York. His father, John Sarantakos, owned a restaurant and doughnut shop. He developed an interest in magic at age seven and took inspiration from the great illusionist Harry Houdini. Angel performed for an audience after five years of practising his craft at age 12, for which he was paid $10. By age 14, Angel was performing throughout high school at restaurants in East Meadow, including the Wine Gallery. Angel's first major illusion was making his mother float in their family den. Early in his career he was helped by animal breeder and reality-television host Marc Morrone, who helped Angel find and train a set of doves for his act.

By the time he graduated from East Meadow High School, he had decided to pursue a career as a professional magician instead of attending college as his parents wanted. According to the Biography Channel, "Angel hit the road and began touring with other traveling performance acts. Between traveling and performing, he attempted to further his education on his own by studying the history of magic in public libraries. He also studied the art of mysticism, music, martial arts and even dance."

== Early career ==
Angel once said, "I stayed away from magicians when I was younger because I didn't want to think like them and wanted to create my own style." His first television appearance was in 1994, where he performed as a part of Secrets, a one-hour ABC primetime special. One of the early supporters of Angel was horror director Clive Barker. In 1995, Barker asked Angel to work with him on his film Lord of Illusions. He also later recorded the intro to Angel's album World of Illusion: System One. Barker stated in the mid-1990s, "Criss Angel is extraordinary, a spectacular mix of visionary magic. This is the future, and it can't come quickly enough." During that year, he collaborated with musician Klayton to form Angeldust, a show that combined magic with music. They released their first album, Musical Conjurings from the World of Illusions, in 1998. Also that year, Angel performed a 10-minute show over the course of the "World of Illusion" conference in Madison Square Garden, performing 60 shows per day. However, by 2000, Klayton's name was removed from Angel's website.

Angel also starred in the 1997 television movie The Science of Magic and its 2003 sequel The Science of Magic II. Criss Angel Mindfreak, which would later become Angel's first television series, was originally an off-Broadway show by Angel, which in 2001 was picked up by the World Underground Theatre. When not performing the show, Angel worked the streets promoting the show to pedestrians. Criss Angel Mindfreak ran for more than 600 performances between 2001 and 2003 at the World Underground Theater in Times Square. His 24 hours in a tank of water set a world record for the longest amount of time for a human to be completely submerged under water. This performance would also become a part of his first television special.

Angel has also been known to actively discourage a belief in mediumship, stating that there is no way for mediums to speak with people beyond the dead. He has said, "If somebody's doing that for entertainment purposes, that's one thing. But if they claim to be communicating with the dead, I don't care if they're from my hometown, I don't care if they're my family members: I'll expose them and tell them what they really are."

=== Water torture cell in Times Square (2002) ===
In August 2002, Angel spent 24 hours shackled underwater in a phone booth-sized water torture cell in New York's Times Square. The act was said to be inspired by the great escape artist, Harry Houdini. WWE corporation being the owners of the World Underground Theatre where Angel had been performing his stage show. To prepare for the trick, he practiced in a neighbor's backyard swimming pool next to his mother's house in East Meadow, New York. Prior to the performance he had only managed to spend 12 consecutive hours in the water. He fasted for 24 hours before the performance to make it through the period without need to exit and use the bathroom. During the trick, he went through 16 oxygen tanks. After the trick, he was required to remove his own shackles and chains before exiting the water. Within an hour, his skin began to react substantially to the water.

At the end of the performance, according to Ted Shaffrey, "Before he emerged from the phone-booth sized contraption of clear plastic and steel, Angel yanked out the air hose that allowed him to breathe. Then assistants pulled a black curtain over the 220-gallon (832-liter) chamber to block the view of television cameras and about 100 people gathered outside the window in which he was displayed. Under cover, Angel apparently escaped from the shackles that bound his arms, legs and neck, before pulling himself from the watery chamber with a celebratory scream." Upon successfully completing the trick, he was described as having "skin crinkled and his eyes bloodshot", and upon emerging from the tank he was taken to St. Clare's Hospital and treated for severe dehydration. He reported afterwards that he had suffered from overheating, jaw fatigue, and semi-consciousness while in the tank.

== Television specials and promotional appearances (2002–2005) ==
On October 20, 2002, Angel performed in the ABC Family television special named Criss Angel Mindfreak: Postmodern illusionist, an hour-long performance and tribute to Harry Houdini. The special aired again on December 24, 2002, on Channel 4 in the U.K. The Birmingham Evening Mail reviewed the show, writing, "Criss Angel is currently making a name for himself as a more provocative, darker alternative to [other illusionists]. He walks the streets of New York, hypnotising passers-by, turning cups of take-away coffee into cockroaches and suspending himself from the ceiling by inserting hooks into his back. The piece de resistance of all these mind games is an update of the Houdini underwater trick - an attempt to stay in a (cell) tank of water for 24 hours, padlocked and restrained. All seems to be going well, until the filter system breaks down and the water begins to heat up."

On October 31, 2003, the Sci-Fi Channel aired the one-hour special Supernatural starring Angel. Kate O'Hare said of the special that, "Filmed in part at Universal Theme Park in Orlando, Fla., "Supernatural" finds Angel crawling up buildings, passing a quarter through his skin, spontaneously combusting and having otherworldly creatures burst from his chest." When asked about his process in creating television specials, Angel said that, "I like to have my hand in everything on my TV specials. I'm the executive producer; I direct it; I create it. I write all the music for my TV specials and my live performances. It's on my label. I write it; I produce it." During the special Angel performed stunts, including lighting himself on fire and making a tarantula emerge from a pedestrian's soda can. In 2003, Angel was also featured in the two-hour TBS special Made in Japan.

In early 2003, Angel performed at the release of the new branding for Miller Lite beer in Milwaukee, Wisconsin, on the 80th anniversary of Houdini's last performance in that city. For the performance, he was suspended ten stories in the air and bound in a straitjacket, from which he escaped. He also performed an illusion at Ozzfest in 2005. During this period Angel also earned money selling signed merchandise, making up to $50,000 a day.

== Criss Angel Mindfreak television series ==
In 2005, Angel became the creator, director, and executive producer of the A&E Network show Criss Angel Mindfreak, and had entered production in January. Seasons 1 and 2 were filmed at The Aladdin in Las Vegas, with Season 3 at the Luxor Las Vegas. Premiering on July 20, 2005, the show's illusions included walking on water, levitating, walking up the side of Luxor Hotel (in the light of 39 focused lamps that can be seen from space), floating between two buildings, causing a Lamborghini to disappear, surviving in an exploding C4 Crate, cutting himself in half in full view of an audience and getting run over by a steamroller while lying on a bed of broken glass.

The first season of the show was released on DVD after it completed its on-screen run. The show also released its Halloween special, along with two special episodes, on an additional one-disc DVD offering. The show returned for a second season in May 2006, and was named one of the best shows of the summer by the Tulsa World newspaper. The show was renewed for a third season in July 2006; as of that third season the show was A&E's number one rated show, with more than 1.5 million viewers. That year he promoted the show with a performance where he was suspended within a cube encased in concrete above Times Square, escaping from the block before it was set to crash to the ground. Magic effects creator Sean Field stated of Angel this year that, "Criss Angel is the biggest name in magic since Houdini ... No other magician has invaded pop culture to the degree that Criss Angel has. He has changed the image of magic and made it cool." The show became one of the most popular foreign television shows in parts of Asia, including China.

The television show was noted as a part of the mid-2000s films, television, and books that drove a resurgence of the public popularity of magic. Criss Angel Mindfreak was the first weekly magic television show to air in 40 years. Daily Variety reviewed the premiere writing, "The stunts alone are impressive. But what makes the show fascinating are the down-home touches in which we see the kid from New York, who first honed his magic skills at the age of 6. Keenly aware of the camera at all times, Angel manages to offer some personality, especially where family is involved. Viewers follow the illusionist as he contemplates new and more dangerous stunts, while his crew, including his often-fretful brothers, offer insight as to what, other than ego, drives someone in this profession."

The show ran from 2005 until 2010, at which point he had been featured for more hours on prime time television than any other magician in history. Other tricks performed in the show included the performance of séances, as well as other tricks in order to teach his audience about con men and how to avoid scams intended to manipulate money out of people.

In July 2008, Angel escaped from a beachside hotel before its demolition in front of a crowd of about 50,000 people, an illusion that also aired on the television program. After the illusion, Angel showed the audience step by step how he achieved the escape. He first picked open a set of handcuffs that had him shackled to a balcony railing. He then smashed the window of the room in order to enter the hotel, and picked padlocks on both the room's internal door and the door to the stairwell. The escape was initially supposed to occur via a ladder that dangled above the hotel's roof 30 seconds before collapse, after picking through five locks on the roof's door. Instead, Angel emerged from the rubble after the collapse, claiming that the initial plan was always to escape via the helicopter. The total time allotted for the entire illusion was four minutes, with dynamite located on the first, second, and fourth floors of the building.

== Criss Angel Believe ==
=== Stage show ===
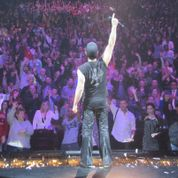
Angel performing in front of a live crowd

In 2006, Angel partnered with Cirque du Soleil to produce the stage show Criss Angel Believe (stylized as "Criss Angel BeLIEve"), premiering the show at the Luxor Las Vegas on September 26, 2008. It became the bestselling live magic show in the world. The name of the show was taken from Harry Houdini, for the mythology of Houdini choosing the word "believe" as the codeword for communicating with Houdini after his death. Luxor's parent company, MGM Mirage, financed the show with $100 million.

After several delays, the show was set for a gala opening on October 31, 2008, with preview shows in late September on the 82nd anniversary of Harry Houdini's death. The initial preview received mixed reactions and reviews. Reporters for the Las Vegas Sun, Los Angeles Times, and Las Vegas Review-Journal cited a lack of the magic Angel is known for, as well as a confusing and uninteresting theme. They also opined that neither Angel nor Cirque du Soleil were able to perform to their capabilities during these initial performances. On the positive side, the Las Vegas Sun later quoted Star Pulse, stating, "He has created a live show that is everything a perfect magic performance should be — and then some. It's not just remarkable magic — it's transcendent art that won't just blow your mind; it will quite possibly change your life."

In April 2009, Angel ended a performance of Believe by "hurling obscene insults" at blogger Perez Hilton, an audience member. Hilton reportedly had texted to his fans during the performance that the show was "unbelievably BAD" and that he'd "rather be getting a root canal", and word had gotten back to Angel by the end of the performance. Cirque du Soleil later apologized to Hilton for Angel's remarks.

In 2010, the Las Vegas Sun critic John Katsilometes, after being unimpressed by the initial show, said Believe had improved by reducing the narrative elements and focusing on the magic. In 2011, the Toronto Star wrote: "The show is easily the most exciting thing now on stage in Vegas!" That year the show attracted an estimated $150 million in ticket sales. The show ran through 2019, and was the best selling magic show in Las Vegas as of 2013.

In 2019, he began his new show "Mindfreak Live" at Planet Hollywood, where he currently performs 5 nights a week.

=== Television series ===
The stage show celebrated its fifth anniversary of appearing on stage in October 2013. That month a cable television series based upon the show entitled Criss Angel BeLIEve was broadcast on Spike TV. The first season included 11 one-hour episodes, including 118 different illusions. Guests on the show include Ludacris, Ice-T, Randy Couture and Shaquille O'Neal. When asked about the three years between the last episode of Mindfreak and his return to television, Angel stated that, "I didn't take long at all to go back to television. It was my choice to work on the live Cirque show and to get that where I wanted it to be.

"Now that that show is just humming and doing amazing business — it's the #1 bestselling magic show in the world as far as ticket sales and the perception that people are experiencing and coming back to see it multiple times — I felt it was in a great place and I could think about television again. Obviously, "Believe" will continue to evolve until its last performance because I always want to add new magic, I'm always tweaking and transforming it. I missed being on television, I had something new creatively to say, and Spike became the perfect home to do it." Endemol purchased the foreign distribution rights for the show, and was the "most-watched new original series [on Spike TV] in more than 18 months" according to The Hollywood Reporter.

In the episode "Lord of Illusions — Death Premonition", Angel paid homage to Clive Barker, the director of the horror movie of the same name. In the episode, Angel performed the closing stunt from the film, in which he laid beneath a circle of suspended swords, and predicted the correct order of six falling swords to avoid becoming stabbed through his body after their release. The swords were selected by the audience with the help of a randomly bouncing ball. According to the Las Vegas Sun, "Criss is the only, and first, magician in the world granted permission from the inventor and filmmaker to re-create the film's death-defying stunt."

For another episode for the series filmed in New York City he was asked by the NYPD not to pre-announce the performance, as crowd control for some Angel performances had become a concern for the police. This trick saw Angel hanging his feet, while bound with two straitjackets and a noose around his neck which were attached to metal weights. While he was successful in the trick, Angel tore his shoulder muscles and this required surgery in January 2014. This resulted in the temporary closing of the Believe stage show between January and April 2014, while he was recovering from the surgery and returning to performance shape. He did however host a new stage show featuring other magicians between February and March 2014 in lieu of performing in his own show. Clips from the show also became the most watched YouTube magic clips in the history of the site, with more than 15 million views.

In the show, Angel revealed the secrets behind some of his illusions to the audience. This included the "Lord of Illusions" trick, where he revealed that he had the swords in a preset order so that he could avoid them. The episode featuring this illusion also includes a meeting between Angel and his team discussing a problem with the trick and how to ensure it does not happen again.

== Phenomenon ==
Starting in October 2007, he appeared as a judge on Phenomenon with Uri Geller. In a CNN interview about the show, he told Larry King "no one has the ability, that I'm aware of, to do anything supernatural, psychic, talk to the dead. And that was what I said I was going to do with Phenomenon. If somebody goes on that show and claims to have supernatural psychic ability, I'm going to bust [him] live and on television."

On the October 31, 2007, episode of the reality show Phenomenon, paranormalist Jim Callahan performed a summoning, purportedly of deceased author Raymond Hill, to help discover the contents of a locked box. Although fellow judge Uri Geller praised the performance, Angel called it "comical" and subsequently challenged both Callahan and Geller to guess the contents of two envelopes he pulled out of his pocket, offering a million dollars of his own money to whoever could do so. This led to an argument between Callahan and Angel, during which Callahan walked toward Angel and called him an "ideological bigot", with the two pulled apart as the show promptly went to a commercial break. Angel has since revealed the contents of one envelope and at the unveiling he challenged Geller one more time. Geller responded, "Although we were born one day apart - I was born on the 20th of December and you on the 19th - a lot of years between us - 40 years, you were one year old when I came out with my spoon bending..." Criss Angel cut him off at this point, saying, "I guess this is a 'no,'" and proceeded to open the envelope. The envelope contained an index card with the numbers "911" printed on it for September 11, 2001. Angel's explanation was this: "If on 9-10 somebody could have predicted that 9-11 was going to happen, they could have saved thousands of lives". The other envelope's contents were scheduled to be revealed on the first episode of Season 4 of Criss Angel: Mindfreak.

== Stage shows ==
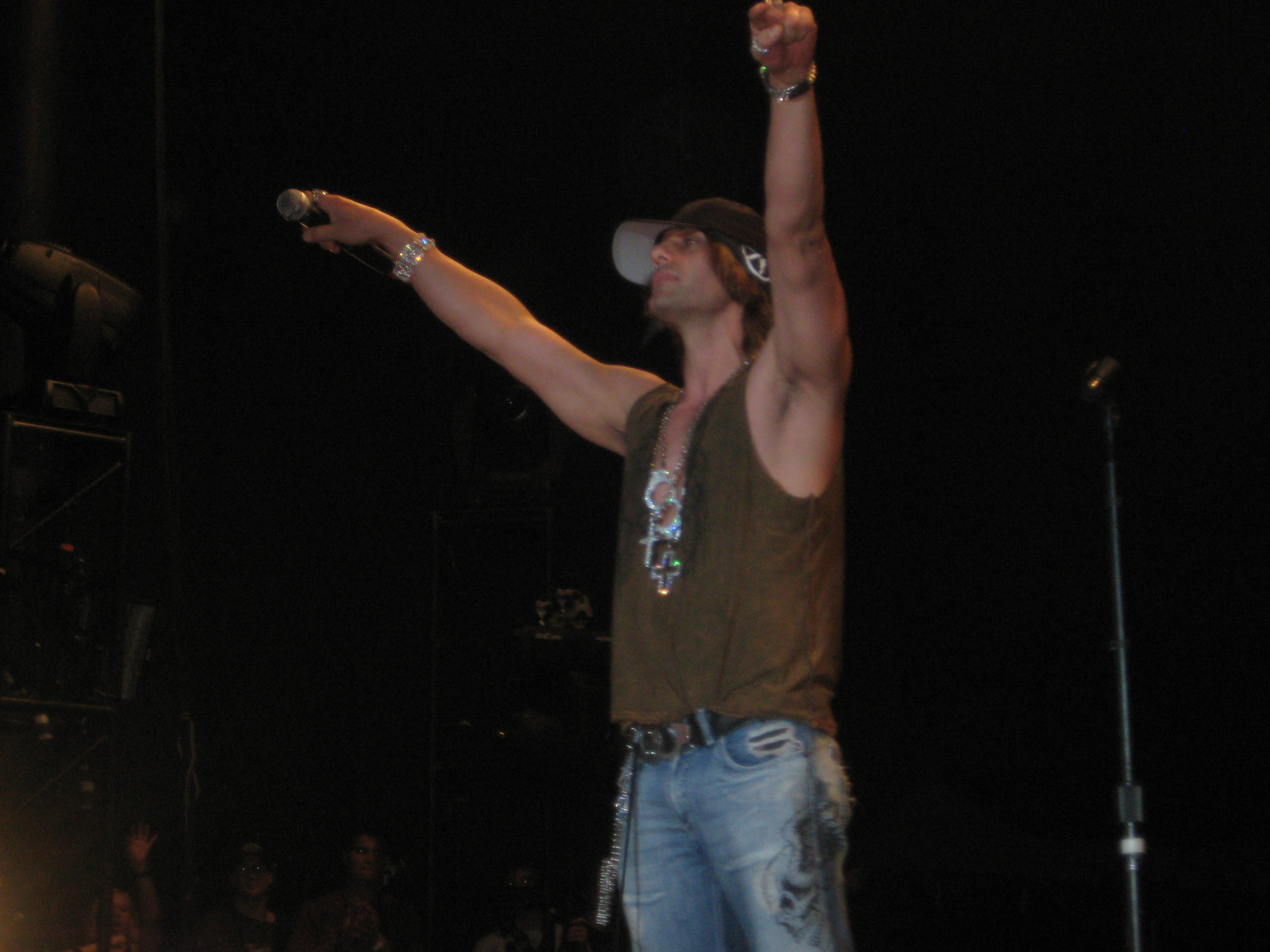
Angel in 2007

=== Criss Angel Magicjam ===
The temporary replacement show for Believe was entitled Criss Angel Magicjam, which was performed in the same Luxor theatre. According to the Las Vegas Sun, the show included, "Longtime Las Vegas comedy-illusionist Nathan Burton; Banachek, the world's premiere mentalist; and new female magician Krystyn Lambert, who has been prominently featured in the Spike series ... joined by grandmaster manipulators Jason Byrne and Tony Clarke, supreme close-up artist Armando Vera and the magic comedy of Russ Merlin." The production was written and directed by Criss Angel. In January 2014, Angel announced that he planned on taking Criss Angel Magicjam on a North American tour during the summer of 2014. The show also featured Angel's own illusions, which he performed for about 40 minutes of the show. Robin Leach said of the show that, "Magicjam is great fun and a high-energy show packed with mind-blowing magic."

=== Criss Angel Mindfreak ===
==== Touring show ====
In 2014, Angel premiered the stage show Mindfreak LIVE! The touring show features illusions from Angel himself, which received positive reviews. The demonstrations used in the show were developed in Angel's illusion laboratory in Las Vegas, located in a 60,000 square foot warehouse. His international touring with the show marked the first time that Angel had traveled with his show in about six years. The premiere show of the performance occurred at Foxwoods Resort Casino in Connecticut during November 2014.

==== Planet Hollywood residency ====
Following on from the success of his touring show, Angel announced his Mindfreak stage show would become a residency show at the Planet Hollywood Hotel in Las Vegas. The first show at Planet Hollywood ran initially from Wednesdays through Sundays in a showroom named after Angel as the Criss Angel Theater. A small number of shows took place in December 2018, before its premiere in mid-January 2019. John Katsilometes at the Las Vegas Review-Journal stated the new show "recast what a magic show is supposed to feel like," due to the extensive use of special effects, pyrotechnics and technology. The show is still running as of 2023, with the latest dates beginning on March 1, 2023.

=== The Supernaturalists ===
The Supernaturalists premiered in June 2015 at the Foxwoods Resort Casino's The Fox Theater, with Angel serving as creator, director and executive producer. Performers for the show include illusionist Landon Swank, magician Krystyn Lambert, escape artist Spencer Horsman, mentalist Banachek, dog conjuror Johnny Dominguez, magician Stefan, and close up magician Adrian Vega. Robin Leach reviewed the show as having "overwhelming positive reactions" and wrote that it contained "the most mind-blowing magic spectacle that's playing anywhere". Angel has stated that the show is a culmination of ten years of development, which he began in 2005, and is intended as a global touring show and as a premiering venue for several new illusions from each magician.

== Variety show appearances and guest spots ==
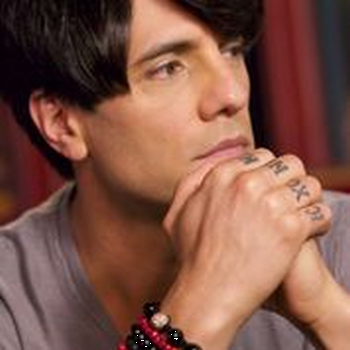
Angel in 2014

Angel has made numerous special television guest appearances on WWE Raw, including acting as guest star on March 8, 2010. He also appeared on The Oprah Winfrey Show, including the premiere episode of its 24th season. During a 2007 episode of the show, he successfully guessed the number between 1 and 100 he asked Winfrey to think of without telling him. Angel has appeared on other talk shows including The Late Late Show with Craig Ferguson, Jimmy Kimmel Live!, The Megan Mullally Show, The Ellen DeGeneres Show, AVN Awards Show 2007 and Larry King Live on CNN. He was also a guest on The Tonight Show, Late Show with David Letterman, America's Got Talent, and The Rosie O'Donnell Show. He also made a guest acting appearance on the hit television shows CSI: NY, Las Vegas and Rules of Engagement. In 2011, Angel also appeared in an Orville Redenbacher Pop-Up Bowl popcorn commercial. He made an appearance on an episode of Hells kitchen (s19e12) In 2020, Angel also voiced himself in the American Dad episode One Fish Two Fish(s15e8)

In May 2005, Angel introduced honoree Ozzy Osbourne at the VH1 Rock Honors awards, biting the head off a bat as a part of the introduction in homage to Osbourne's early career onstage antics. At the 2007 MTV Video Music Awards, Angel performed an illusion as a part of the musical performance by Britney Spears and helped to plan her stage show, which opened the television broadcast. He was also hired as the illusionist for the planned 2009 Michael Jackson O2 arena concerts before Jackson's death. In 2013, Angel had a cameo in the feature film The Incredible Burt Wonderstone, and Jim Carrey's character in the movie "Steve Gray" has been said to be modeled after Angel. There is a wax statue of Angel in the Madame Tussauds wax museum in Las Vegas.

== Other projects ==
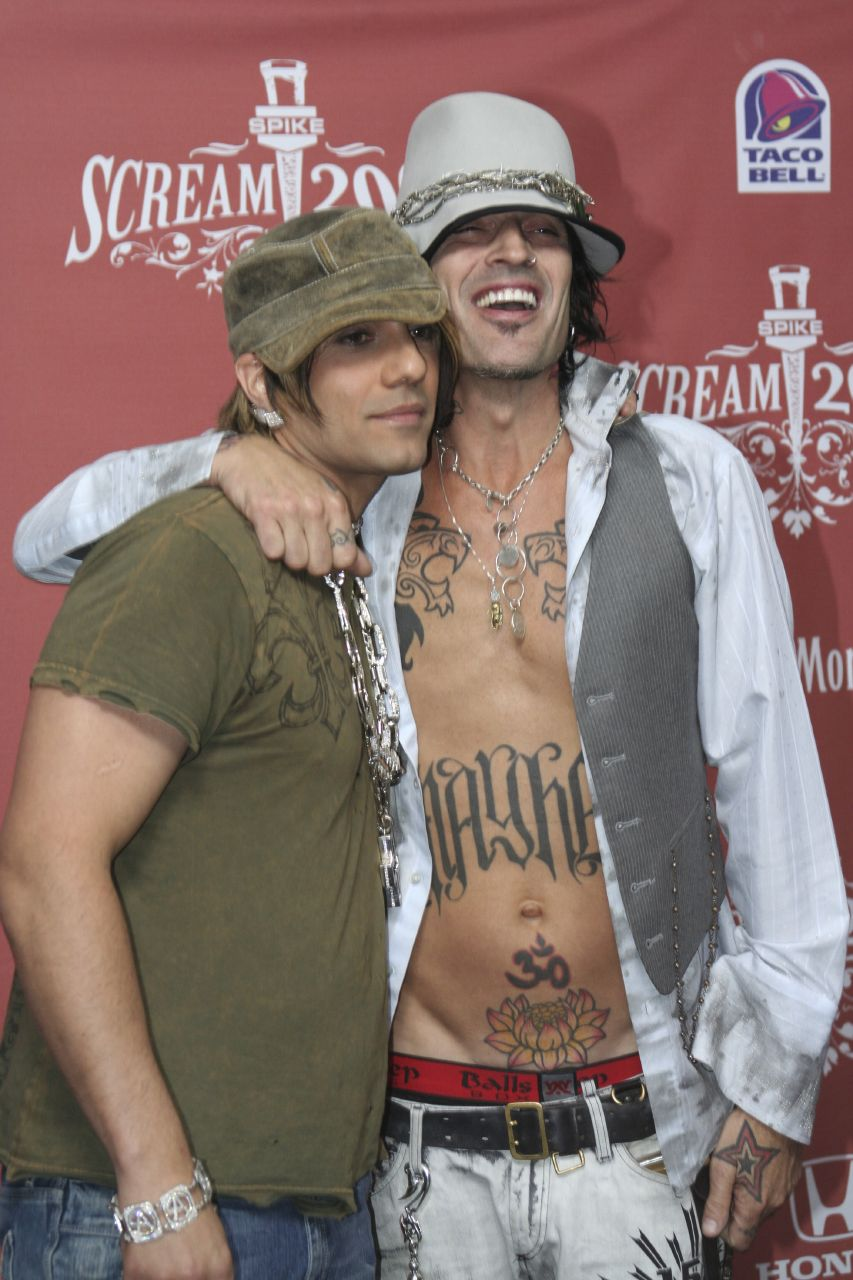
Angel (left) with Tommy Lee

=== Music ===
Angel has a passion for music and claims to have been a musician longer than a magician. In 1989, he fronted the short-lived heavy metal band Angel and produced a promotional music video for the song "Don't You Want My Love", incorporating several magic tricks. Angel later went on to collaborate with industrial rock musician Klay Scott for a new band titled Angeldust in 1995. Angeldust released its debut album Musical Conjurings from the World of Illusion in 1998. He later released the albums System 1, System 2, and System 3. In 2003, he released the album Supernatural. His musical style continues to be in the heavy metal style, though when describing his musical style he has said, "There are elements where it's more electronic, and there are orchestrated sections. I decided to take it in different places because I'm inspired by emotion and by giving people a connection, a sense of a feeling — whether it's excitement or crying or being happy." He also produced soundtracks for his television series Mindfreak, including collaborations with members of Korn and Godsmack.

=== Books ===
Angel is the author of the book Mindfreak: Secret Revelations, published by HarperEntertainment in 2007. Mindfreak: Secret Revelations appeared on the Los Angeles Times bestseller list that year. According to the Las Vegas Sun, "The 295-page book details the early beginnings of his career, memorable demonstrations from his TV show and personal reflections. "Secret Revelations" also contains several pictures and provides step-by-step instructions for 40 of his basic Mindfreaks. Laura Morton helped the magician write the book." California Bookwatch wrote that it "tells of Criss Angel's evolution as a performance artist, magician and musician, charting his rise to fame beginning at age 6 and adding details of his life and his artistic philosophy and influences ... His survey covers the 'Mindfreaks' which allow him to push for excellence in very different worlds".

=== Internet ===
Criss Angel is the most watched magician in Internet history since the late 2000s. His clip "Walk on Water" had received more than 39 million views by 2010, and more than 46 million by 2013. By early 2013, his videos had achieved more than 200 million views. Another highly watched clip is "Rip Bodies Apart", taken from the premiere episode of BeLIEve, which had more than twelve million views within a month.

=== Merchandise ===
In 2010, Angel partnered with IdeaVillage to release the Criss Angel Magic Collection, which contained six Mindfreak Magic Tricks instructions, 250 tricks, and a magic kit for children. The product was backed by $50 million in marketing.

=== Criss Angel's Magic with the Stars ===
Criss Angel's Magic with the Stars aired weekly episodes on The CW, beginning in late 2022. Numerous stars appeared in the first season including Donny Osmond, Randy Couture and Michael Ian Black.

Each week two celebrities compete against each other after they are trained by Angel. There are three categories which are performed in front of a live audience and judged by Angel, Loni Love and Lance Burton.

== Recognition ==
=== Awards ===
Angel won the International Magician Society's Magician of the Year award in 2001, 2004, 2005, 2007 and 2008, in addition to its "Magician of the Decade" title in 2009 and "Magician of the Century" title in 2010. He was the 22nd recipient of the Louie Award for outstanding achievement in the art of magic. He has also appeared on the covers of Magic and Genii magazines. In 2008, Angel was one of the inaugural nominees for the Harry Houdini Award, awarded by the Harry Houdini Museum. Angel is the youngest magician to ever be inducted into the International Magician Society's Magic Hall of Fame. He is also the only man to have won the Merlin Magician of the Year award on two occasions, in 2001 and 2004.

In 2011, he was awarded the World Magic Legacy Awards' Living Legend award. During the same year, Angel was inducted to the International Magicians Society's Hall of Fame. As a result, it made him the youngest IMS inductee to date, aged 43. On July 20, 2017, Angel was the recipient of a star on the Hollywood Walk of Fame. His star is located next to The Hollywood Roosevelt Hotel and across the street from the star of his childhood idol, Harry Houdini. The International Brotherhood of Magicians presented Angel with a Lifetime Achievement Award in July 2018, becoming only the sixth illusionist to receive the award. Vanish Magic magazine awarded Angel "The Greatest of All Time" illusionist award in 2022.

=== World records ===
==== Body suspension (held 2002-2008) ====
In February 2002, Angel broke the world record for the longest body suspension, setting a record of 5 hours 42 minutes. The record was set in Times Square, New York, where he performed the record-breaking stunt, suspended by eight fishhooks in his body. He held the world record until it was broken in 2008.

==== Others ====
He set the fastest time to perform the "Metamorphosis" illusion at less than one second. He is also the holder of the Guinness world record for "The most people to disappear in an illusion", for making 100 people disappear on May 26, 2010, during a performance of Believe at the Luxor.

== Personal life ==
In 2002, Angel married his longtime girlfriend JoAnn Winkhart. The couple filed for divorce four years later. Although Angel was seen with his wife in the buried alive illusion (season 1, episode 6, 2005) and the body suspension illusion (season 1, episode 5, 2005), she was not credited as his wife; rather, she was listed as "Criss's Girl". In November 2008, Angel began dating Holly Madison, former girlfriend of Hugh Hefner. The relationship ended in February 2009. He proposed to Sandra Gonzalez on September 7, 2011, in Cabo San Lucas during a sunset dinner. They broke up shortly after. Since 2012, Angel has been dating Australian singer Shaunyl Benson. The couple have two sons together, born in 2014 and 2019, and a daughter born in 2021. In 2015, the couple's first child was diagnosed with b-cell acute lymphoblastic leukemia (ALL).

As of 2010, Big Bear Choppers had produced seven custom-made motorcycles for Angel, who featured the motorcycle designers on his show Criss Angel Mindfreak. He also had a Harley Davidson motorcycle built by Orange County Choppers, which he rode in the intro filmed for Criss Angel Mindfreak. As a philanthropist, Angel created the Believe Foundation 'Believe Anything is Possible', and was awarded the Make-A-Wish Foundation award for most supportive celebrity on May 19, 2010. He was also awarded the foundation's Chris Greicius Celebrity Award in 2007. As of 2016, Angel's business interests made about $70 million in revenues annually.

In 2025, while attending the Kennedy Center Honors, Angel said that "what [Donald Trump is] doing in a lot of ways is fantastic… and I'm really excited to see where the country goes and how his policies are gonna affect us, hopefully in a profound, positive way."
