= List of Criss Angel Mindfreak episodes =

The following is a list of episodes from Criss Angel Mindfreak. A total of 96 episodes have aired.

== Season 1 (2005) ==
Criss Angel Mindfreak Season 1 premiered on the A&E network on Wednesday July 20, 2005. It consists of 18 episodes.

Episode name	Air Date	Description
Burned Alive	20 July 2005	Criss faces one of people's biggest fears, he will be burned alive in the streets of Las Vegas.
Levitation	20 July 2005	Criss takes a random spectator and levitates them 360 degrees on downtown Fremont Street in Las Vegas.
Wine Barrel Escape	27 July 2005	Criss will devise a plan to top Houdini's milk can escape, being handcuffed and hung eight stories above the ground before the wine barrel falls after the two-minute mark.
SUV Nail Bed	27 July 2005	Criss will lie on a bed of nails as a four-and-a half-ton SUV Hummer drives over his body.
Body Suspension	3 Aug 2005	Criss is suspended from a helicopter while hanging from four fish hooks as he is flown over the Valley of Fire.
Buried Alive	10 Aug 2005	Criss does what no one would even consider doing, being buried alive. With little oxygen, Criss must escape and slither out of solid ground.
Hellstromism	17 Aug 2005	Criss Angel is challenged by a Las Vegas desert Dodge dealership to find a hidden key for a Dodge Viper using hellstromism.
Superhuman	24 Aug 2005	With great strength, Criss sets out to lift a random taxi 2 feet (0.61 m) off the ground in the Aladdin Hotel taxi line.
Blind	7 Sep 2005	Criss will drive Mandy Moore to one of her favorite restaurants while blindfolded.
Tesla Strike	14 Sep 2005	Criss will journey out to Baraboo, Wisconsin, and test out one of the largest Tesla coils in the country.
Oasis	21 Sep 2005	For a full 33 hours, Criss will be in a chamber that is submerged in 2,000 US gallons (7,600 L) of water and will have to figure out how he will escape surrounded by thousands of spectators and news crews in New York City's Bryant Park.
Building Walk	28 Sep 2005	In this episode, Criss will lean over the side of the 55th floor of the Aladdin Hotel and will walk down the side without any safety.
C4 Crate	5 Oct 2005	Criss will be locked in an explosives filled crate and will experience the power of C4.
Prediction	12 Oct 2005	In this episode, Criss will attempt to predict a major news event, as well as the lottery.
Chicken	19 Oct 2005	Criss has the Amazing Jonathan take a car and run him over through a brick wall. He will also perform a knife test in a sushi bar.
Halloween	31 Oct 2005	Criss is handcuffed and nailed into a wood coffin. He must get out before being pulled through a woodchipper.
Uncut	2 Nov 2005	Includes footage not yet played on the series. Also, outtakes of Criss' most talked-about illusion: the trash can.
Up Close	16 Nov 2005	Get up close and get an inside look at the characters of the show, including Criss's surreal family. Also, Criss shows more never before seen footage.

== Season 2 (2006) ==
Criss Angel Mindfreak Season 2 premiered on the A&E network on Wednesday May 31, 2006. It consists of 22 episodes.

Episode name	Air Date	Description
Building Float	31 May 2006	Criss takes Criss Angel Mindfreak's Season 1 episode "Levitation" to a whole new level. He will float from one building to another in front of a random crowd in broad daylight.
Vanish	31 May 2006	In this episode, Criss will vanish a spectator 360 degrees by thousands of witnesses in the middle of Las Vegas' Fremont Street.
In Two	7 June 2006	Criss Angel will demonstrate his version of being cut in half without covers, boxes or trick clothing.
Walk on Water	7 June 2006	Criss will attempt to walk across an entire pool while people swim below and around him.
Animal Magic	14 June 2006	Criss will make a four-and-a half-ton Asian elephant vanish in the middle of the street surrounded by spectators.
Easy Rider	14 June 2006	Criss is chained and sealed inside a wooden box filled with explosives. He must escape before a stunt car rams into him in front of a large crowd.
Party	21 June 2006	Criss and crew put incredible insane illusions into Sin City's nightlife scene. He will then put his hand right through a passerby.
Bike Jump Vanish	28 June 2006	In this episode of Mindfreak, Criss will hit a 60-foot-long (18 m) ramp bike jump into the air and vanish.
Chad's Story	5 July 2006	Criss helps a young magician, Chad Juros, achieve his dream of performing as a Las Vegas headliner.
Celebrity Minds	12 July 2006	Criss will use hypnosis techniques to drop crowds and put restaurant patrons and staff under his control.
Metamorphosis	19 July 2006	In front of thousands of spectators, Criss demonstrates one of the fastest metamorphoses ever attempted.
Back to School	2 Aug 2006	In this episode, when Criss goes back to school, he freaks out the students and teachers and shows how to mindfreak your friends. It has been stated by students and staff at East Meadow High School that only one scene takes place at the school and the others at another school or studio.
Sucker	9 Aug 2006	Criss demonstrates psychic surgery and warns us of scammers that like to prey on the innocent. He will blow the lid off anyone who uses magic to take advantage of others.
Prophecy	16 Aug 2006	Criss predicts the outcome of a motor speedway race and does close up magic in his favorite hometown diner.
Motorcycle Roulette	23 Aug 2006	On Long Island, New York, Criss shares his passions for motorcycles and makes one vanish and reappear.
Military Salute	6 Sep 2006	This episode features mentalism, sleight of hand and other grand illusions. Criss visits Vandenberg Air Force Base and makes a Hummer appear from nowhere.
Straightjacket Keelhaul	13 Sep 2006	Attempting to survive, Criss is towed through the ocean and has to escape a straitjacket before being drowned alive.
Shark Cage Escape	27 Sep 2006	Pushed overboard and sunk to the bottom of the sea, Criss must escape a shark cage with but one breath.
Magician of the Year	27 Sep 2006	Included with some ultimate feat of mentalism, a pre-recorded DVD will leave the magic community floored.
Celebrity Seance	31 Oct 2006	In the Amargosa Hotel in Death Valley Junction known for ghostly spirits, Criss invites guests in and tries to connect with forces beyond our comprehension.
My Secret Cabaret	8 Nov 2006	Criss stops his pulse in five places; bloopers and outtakes.

== Season 3 (2007) ==
Criss Angel Mindfreak Season 3 premiered on the A&E network on Tuesday June 5, 2007. It consists of 25 episodes: 19 episodes that aired on television, and 6 episodes that were only released on the Collector's Edition Megaset DVD box set.

Episode name	Air Date	Description
Luxor Light	5 June 2007	In the Criss Angel Mindfreak Season 3 opener, Criss will attempt to float more than 500 feet (150 m) above the Luxor, one of two man-made objects seen from space. In addition to this, he will levitate down the largest atrium in the world and make his motorbike transform into three girls.
Steamroller	12 June 2007	Criss will lie on a bed of broken glass as a steamroller rolls over his body.
Prisoner Transport Escape	12 June 2007	After being locked in a mailbag, Criss will attempt to escape a caged truck filled with explosives before it runs off the edge of a cliff (Criss suffered a neck injury during the attempted escape, causing filming to be stopped for three weeks. He vowed never to attempt this stunt again). Also, he will make himself levitate over a tree in a golf court.
Motorhead	19 June 2007	In this episode, Criss highlights cars, trucks and bikes in his illusions. He will turn a Bentley into a Lamborghini and vanishes his Lamborghini while driving it at a high speed.
Screwed	19 June 2007	With a row of 12 18-inch screwdrivers, Criss will proceed to walk on every one of them barefoot.
Animal 2	26 June 2007	The elephant that Criss made vanish in Season 2 will amaze us with his animal illusions by making it reappear.
Quad Drag Escape	10 July 2007	Distracted by the news of his mother's heart surgery, Criss must escape while being bound and dragged by an ATV in the Excalibur Hotel and Casino arena.
Raging Bull	17 July 2007	Criss will attempt to vanish before a raging Mexican bull charges him.
Car Crash Escape	24 July 2007	A car parked with explosives and Criss chained to the side will leave him less of a chance to escape free before a speeding car plow into him.
Sucker 2	31 July 2007	In Season 2, Criss introduced us to scammers and charlatans. This time, he will show more and reveal the ultimate secret, the words that unlock the key to attaining anything you desire.
Drowned	7 Aug 2007	In this episode, Criss runs into some serious trouble attempting one of Houdini's famous water escapes.
Naked Jail Escape	14 Aug 2007	Criss has just two hours to escape from a jail cell before a mob of fans busts him in his birthday suit.
Burning Man	21 Aug 2007	Criss is led by illusionist Jeff McBride on a rite of passage and a dangerous feat involving fire and discusses Southwestern Native American rites of passage with mentalist Paul Draper.
Rollercoaster Thru Criss	28 Aug 2007	Tied to the tracks of a speeding rollercoaster, Criss must escape before the coaster hits him or passes through him. A random lady he hypnotizes also passes through Criss' body. Carrot Top is also featured in a trick.
Underwater Car Escape	4 Sep 2007	Tied and locked into the trunk of a car, Criss is lowered into a lake and must escape before he runs out of air or drowns.
The Loyal	11 Sep 2007	Criss pays tribute to the loyal and shocks some of his admirers. He makes a car appear from thin air, giving it to one of his fans.
Mentalism	25 Sep 2007	In this episode, Criss will attempt to teleport a group of people from one elevator to another in one continuous shot.
The Kid In Criss	18 Sep 2007	Criss decides to be a kid again and goes back to being young. He dresses up as Santa Claus and makes a truck full of toys appear from nowhere.
Cement Block	23 Oct 2007	Cement is poured into a Plexiglas container that holds Criss five stories high and gives him 24 hours to escape before it crashes to the ground.
Seance	30 Oct 2007	In this creepy episode, filmed at The Artisan Hotel in Las Vegas, Criss attempts to bridge the world between the living and the dead and proves he can walk on the ceiling. He asks a spectator to think of a name that appears on his skin written in blood. Criss also gets possessed in this episode, but is it real or is it fake?

=== Unaired Season 3 episodes (Collector's Edition Megaset exclusives) ===
These 6 episodes were previously unreleased and were only available in the Criss Angel Mindfreak: Collector's Edition Megaset.

Episode name	Air Date	Description
Mayhem in the Making	26 Dec 2007	This episode will chronicle a day in the life of Criss Angel as he attempts to shoot an episode of Criss Angel Mindfreak. Criss will make a room transform into the hottest party in Vegas.
Thunderbirds	26 Dec 2007	Criss will make six fighter jets appear from thin air on a runway. Criss also gets his new Mindfreak III chopper.
H2O Teleportation	26 Dec 2007	Criss will vanish from a yacht to instantly reappear on the beach in front of beachgoers.
Mexico Barrel Escape	26 Dec 2007	Criss is suspended hundreds of feet above the ocean in a barrel before being dropped. The barrel crashes to the sea leaving only one question: did Criss survive?
Most Memorable Mindfreak Moments	28 Dec 2007	Criss, along with tons of celebrity guest stars, will go back to some of the most memorable Criss Angel Mindfreak moments when Criss performed more of his most insane illusions.
Fantasy	29 Dec 2007	In this episode of Criss Angel Mindfreak, Criss will hypnotize a mass crowd of people to remove their clothes in public.

== Season 4 (2008) ==
Criss Angel Mindfreak Season 4 premiered on the A&E network on Wednesday July 23, 2008. It consists of 18 episodes.

Episode name	Air Date	Description
Walk On Lake	23 July 2008	Criss Angel Mindfreak season 4 began with an hour-long fourth season premiere where Criss walked out more than 200 feet (61 m) on the largest man-made lake, Lake Mead, in front of bystanders and boaters. In addition to this, he vanished before getting hit from a car and appeared from inside the car.
Building Implosion	30 July 2008	With a one-hour live special Mindfreak episode, the nine-story Spyglass hotel in Clearwater, FL was loaded with explosives, leaving Criss to escape before it implodes to the ground. The live stunts were presented by Welsh actor and TV host Tim Vincent.
Skeptic	6 Aug 2008	Placing several advertisements and postings seeking those who are skeptical of Criss's abilities, Criss invites these skeptics to be part of a deadly challenge.
Nail Gun	6 Aug 2008	In this episode, Criss attempts to catch a nail traveling at 1,400 feet per second and uses a jigsaw to cut through a fan's arm.
Barrel Drop	13 Aug 2008	Placed in an 85-US-gallon (320 L) drum, the handcuffed Criss will be secured and hoisted 100 feet (30 m) above spectators. Given the chance to escape before it is set to automatically release, the barrel will crash to the ground.
Cremation	13 Aug 2008	In a horrifying episode of Mindfreak, spectators will watch before their eyes as Criss is laid on a wooden slab to be cremated alive.
Spirits of New Orleans	20 Aug 2008	Criss visits New Orleans and trances bystanders utilizing the mysticism and culture of the city.
Escape Over Bourbon Street	20 Aug 2008	With thousands of spectators surrounding Bourbon Street, Criss is completely secured in two straitjackets, shackled and hung upside down above the crowd before attempting to escape.
Impenetrable	27 Aug 2008	Criss will make the impossible become reality once again when he attempts to merge through metal and pass from one oil drum to another.
Close Up	27 Aug 2008	Criss demonstrates the art of close-up magic. Experts discuss the history, the techniques, and the fun that goes with the magic genre.
Premonition	3 Sep 2008	Using his ability to connect with people, Criss attempts to transfer energy through the TV screen to millions of people at home.
In Your Face	3 Sep 2008	Criss receives a surprise visit from Playboy's The Girls Next Door. He invites them along and stuns them as he performs various unexplainable up close and in your face magic.
Mindfreaking With the Stars	10 Sep 2008	Criss runs into his good friend Gene Simmons. With a friendly 1-million-dollar bet, Criss challenges Gene to witness a feat of mentalism. If he fails the challenge, he will lose the 1 million dollars.
Tronik	10 Sep 2008	Criss still loves toys; in the spirit of this, he transforms a toy Hummer into a real Hummer and recreates the highlight of his Broadway show.
Billionaire Prediction	17 Sep 2008	With his powerful mind, Criss will describe unknown personal details and predict events before they take place. He will also read a list of items and attempt to predict what viewers at home would pick.
24-Hour Birthday Bash	17 Sep 2008	Criss is known for surprising over 1,000 people over four seasons of Criss Angel Mindfreak, this time his crew and celebrity friends will turn the tables on him and throw the biggest surprise, all behind closed doors for more than 24 hours.
Car Wreck Vanish	24 Sep 2008	On a special episode of Criss Angel Mindfreak, Criss and Sully go out on a road trip for the greatest time of their lives. In a car filled with explosives, a handcuffed Criss must escape or pull off the greatest illusion before he is pronounced roadkill. Kurt Angle appeared on this episode.
Silverton Final Attempt	1 Oct 2008	Criss reattempts a demonstration that he was not allowed to do in Season 3. This time he will make it all up to the loyals and escape from being chained and confined in a locked box underwater.

== Season 5 (2009) ==
Criss Angel Mindfreak Season 5 premiered on the A&E network Wednesday August 12, 2009. The season is known as The Five Lives of Criss Angel Mindfreak. It is only 5 episodes long.

Episode name	Air Date	Description
White Death	12 Aug 2009	Criss takes the "Buried Alive" escape attempt to an unprecedented level, adding the extra weight and freezing temperatures of snow and ice. Criss will be locked in a glass coffin with handcuffs and will be lowered six feet beneath the snow. Then he has to get out of the handcuffs and dig his way through the snow before hypothermia sets in.
Death Field	19 Aug 2009	Criss attempts to safely traverse a field of live explosives where the potential for serious injury, if not death, is extremely high.
Mass Levitation	26 Aug 2009	Criss takes levitation to new heights by levitating an entire Las Vegas crowd.
Terminal Velocity	2 Sep 2009	Criss will attempt to perform a transposition where he will drop an object from a building and catch it before it touches the ground. Then he will take his transposition skills to a whole new level by vanishing himself and his 220 lb. bike while he is inside a cage which is hanging from a crane. Then he will simultaneously reappear himself with the bike somewhere else.
Death Crash	9 Sep 2009	Criss, along with Kurt Angle, will be locked in one of five coffins while a 3-ton automobile will be employed to smash them to splinters, one at a time.

== Season 6 (2010) ==
Criss Angel Mindfreak Season 6 premiered on the A&E network Wednesday August 4, 2010. It is 6 episodes long.

Episode name	Air Date	Description
Grand Canyon Death Jump	4 Aug 2010	Criss attempts to jump the Grand Canyon on a high-performance hybrid motorcycle. He will either miraculously appear inside a locked cage dangling from a helicopter or plummet 4,200 feet (1,300 m) to his death.
Luxor Walk	11 Aug 2010	Criss attempts to defy the laws of gravity and walk up the entire side of the Luxor Hotel and Casino, which rises more than 650 feet (200 m) above the Las Vegas strip and disappear into the incinerating light atop the pyramid in front of thousands of spectators.
Cement Shoes	18 Aug 2010	An homage to Harry Houdini’s most dangerous escape, Criss is chained and shackled with more than 100 feet of chains and more than 20 locks and lowered 90 feet from the side of the London Bridge in the cold, murky water of Lake Havasu, Arizona in front of 12,000 spectators. To make the escape even more impossible and drowning an almost certainty, Criss has his feet imbedded in a barrel of cement before being lowered off the bridge and deep into the lake below.
100 Gone	1 Sep 2010	Criss will attempt to set a Guinness World Record for the largest vanish of people in history. One hundred people are chosen at random and shackled together in front of a crowd of thousands at the Luxor Convention Arena and Criss attempts to make them all disappear instantaneously.
Smash	8 Sep 2010	At the monumental Grand Canyon Sky Walk, in front of more than 1,000 onlookers, Criss is shackled and locked inside a confining solid crate except for holes to view his face and hands at all times. The crate is then hoisted over the edge of the canyon more than 4,200 feet above the Colorado River. Criss reveals his process of escape but if he does not succeed in time, he will fatally crash to the rocky depths below.
Levitation Vanish	8 Sep 2010	With Criss's chaotic schedule, including his live performance of BeLIEve 10 times each week, the taping of his hit TV series and moving into Serenity, his new home, Criss decides to escape the city for the Valley of fire deep into the Mojave Desert. In this remote and mystical place, Criss will attempt to miraculously levitate more than 100 feet (30 m) up into the sky and then vanish.
