= Criss Angel Believe (Cirque du Soleil) =

Coordinates: 36°5′43.67″N 115°10′32.94″W

Criss Angel: Believe
- Logo for Criss Angel: Believe by Cirque du Soleil
- Company: Cirque du Soleil
- Genre: Contemporary circus
- Show type: Resident show
- Date of premiere: October 31, 2008
- Final show: April 17, 2016
- Location: Luxor hotel, Las Vegas

Creative team
- Co-writer and star: Criss Angel
- Director and co-writer: Serge Denoncourt
- Director of creation: Pierre Phaneuf
- Associate director of creation: Christiane Barette
- Set designer: Ray Winkler
- Costume designer: Mérédith Caron
- Composer: Éric Serra
- Choreographer: Wade Robson
- Lighting designer: Jeanette Farmer
- Sound designer: Jonathan Deans
- Projections designer: Francis Laporte
- Acrobatic equipment/rigging: Jaque Paquin
- Acrobatic act designer: André Simard
- Props and puppets: Michael Curry
- Makeup designer: Nathalie Gagné

Other information
- Preceded by: Zed (2008)
- Succeeded by: Ovo (2009)
- Official website

Criss Angel Believe was the sixth Cirque du Soleil show in Las Vegas, which premiered at the 1,600-capacity Believe Theatre inside the Luxor hotel in Las Vegas in 2008. It is a theatrical production created in partnership of Cirque du Soleil and magician Criss Angel, who was billed as the "co-writer, illusions creator and designer, original concept creator and star" of the show. The show had its final performance on April 17, 2016, being replaced by Criss Angel Mindfreak Live on May 11 of the same year.

== History ==
=== Development ===
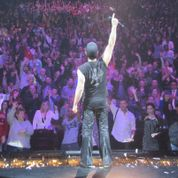
Criss Angel before live crowd

Angel claimed to have been developing aspects of the show for over 15 years. He originally tried to develop the show for a Broadway run, as well as other casinos, but nothing came to fruition. Eventually, Believe came together when he entered a partnership with Cirque du Soleil and the Luxor's parent company, MGM Mirage Resorts, which financed the show with $100 million. The partnership marked the first time Cirque built a show around an individual performer.

After the failure of the musical Hairspray at Luxor, MGM Mirage signed with Cirque to install a new show for the theater by 2008, the sixth Cirque show on The Strip. That show became the partnership with Angel, which was formally announced on March 22, 2008, in a press conference with MGM Mirage and Cirque executives, and Angel that included an awkward speech by the latter. The title was announced in a press release on April 17. During this period, Angel received bad press from incidents during the Miss USA 2008 contest. After his then-girlfriend, Miss Nevada, was eliminated, Angel was filmed on NBC giving the finger; afterward he threatened Las Vegas Review-Journal gossip columnist Norm Clarke over negative press regarding his actions earlier in the competition: Angel told Clarke, who had an eye removed and wears an eyepatch, "Don't ever write another word about me, or you'll need an eyepatch over your other eye." Angel refused to apologize and later denied the incident ever occurred, despite an assertions from several including the Review-Journal's publisher.

Angel described the show as "[A]bout my life. It's Alice in Wonderland. It's The Wizard of Oz. Mindfreak. It's about the demons in my head, the good that's out there, the angels and love and lust—all that stuff mixed up." Cirque selected Serge Denoncourt as director and co-writer, a somewhat counterintuitive selection since he explicitly disliked magic. Denoncourt stated that he was "trying to direct a show for people who love it but also for people like me who hate magic".

Originally planned for a summer 2008 opening, more than $5 million in advance tickets were sold. After several delays, the show had was set for a gala opening on October 31, 2008 with preview shows in late September.

=== Reception ===
Audience reactions to the initial preview performance were thoroughly negative. The show opened to equally harsh reviews, citing a lack of the magic Angel is known for as well as a confusing and uninteresting theme; reviewers felt neither Angel nor Cirque du Soleil were able to perform their capabilities. By December 17, two months into the show's run, the Luxor was offering a 40% discount on show tickets. In lieu of quotes from theater critics, by January 2009 the Believe website used quotes from celebrities, including Angel's then-girlfriend, Holly Madison.

==== Perez Hilton ====
After Cirque du Soleil spent some months altering the show, blogger and television personality Perez Hilton attended a performance on April 17, 2009. During the show, Hilton tweeted to his half-million Twitter followers: "We are 20 minutes in and Criss Angel's Vegas show, Believe, is unbelievably BAD!", followed by other criticism. As the show was ending, Angel singled out Hilton, asked him to stand up, and told the audience, "We have the world's biggest douchebag asshole in the house!" To which Hilton replied, "Thanks for the free tickets." Hilton, who was a fan of Cirque du Soleil's other Vegas shows, later noted that "until 'Believe', Cirque has had an incredible track record of excellence. I have seen all of their Vegas shows and loved them all."

Afterwards, Cirque du Soleil, but not Angel, apologized to Hilton and the rest of the audience. Speaking also on behalf of hotel owner MGM Mirage, Cirque du Soleil called Angel's remarks "inappropriate and disrespectful", noting that "Cirque du Soleil does not condone disrespectful behavior towards any audience member at any time. Cirque management will address such behavior privately with any of its artists to ensure it will not happen again." The Vegas media reaction was strongly against Angel, who was viewed as having broken a taboo among casino employees in the largely tourist economy by insulting a guest, notably during an economic downturn.

=== Additional illusions added ===
After many reviews cited the disappointing lack of magic in the show, officials announced in April 2010 that they would add some 30 illusions to the performance by May 2010. — twice the number of illusions in any other show then on the Las Vegas Strip. This was the second major change to the show; the first was in April 2009.

== Cast ==
- Criss Angel: Criss acts as the protagonist of his show, as a Victorian Noble who is on a quest for love and to find his existence in this surreal world.
- Crimson: The antagonist of Believe, Crimson is often dressed in reds and blacks to symbolize her evil nature. She fights desperately for both Criss' love and to destroy his life. Crimson acts as the evil force in the show.
- Kayala: A foil to Crimson, Kayala is Criss' reciprocating love. She was born out of a large poppy, and acts as the force of good in the show.
- Ushers: Maestro, Luigi, Slim and Lars are the four bumbling assistants to Criss, acting as his link between the real world and the world of Believe. Maestro acts as the leader of the four, controlling them, along with performing mediocre magic tricks.
- Lucky: Lucky is a white rabbit, appearing during the show only for a short period of time. He is the mascot of Believe, and much of the show's merchandise features him.

== Acts ==
Before the show opens, the Ushers come out and interact with the audience; most notable are Maestro's simple magic tricks and his obvious desire to be Criss.

- Opening
- Premonition: Criss comes towards the audience and throws his wristband into the crowd. Once a spectator catches it, Criss has the person tell their name, where they're from, and to pick any word out of the English language. A small, locked box (always within the view of the audience) is then lowered from the top of the stage, where Maestro opens it and brings its contents - a clear plastic jar with a piece of paper in it - to Criss and the selected audience member. Much to the amazement of the audience, the paper contains the name, location, and chosen word of the participant.
- Tesla Coil: Criss is suited up in a chainmail outfit as a very large tesla coil is presented onstage. Criss goes to enter the cage surrounding the coil, but Crimson has other plans. She turns the power to the coil all the way on, causing sparks to fly and the theatre lights to go out. A pained shout is heard from Criss, and he writhes on the ground in pain as human-sized rabbits in doctor's coats lift him onto a gurney and roll him offstage.
- Lucky and Homage to the Rabbits: A small rabbit appears on a large projection screen, desperately trying to escape. It makes its way out and hops onto a box, taking a small microphone and discussing Cirque du Soleil show rules and how it is now going to take over the show. While assuring the audience that no animals were harmed during the production of the show, a large light burns out and falls from the top of the stage, crushing Lucky and killing him instantly. The Ushers come out to find Lucky, placing him on the front of the stage as multiple rabbits come out to dance for their fallen friend. While they dance, Lucky's corpse is taken away, only to be replaced with Criss' body on a gurney. Crimson, who seems to be leading the dance, rips Criss' form off of the gurney and onto the floor, where all of the rabbits fight over it to get a piece. They then dance around with his limbs, head and torso, before being shooed away by the Ushers.
- Humbodik: The Ushers reassemble Criss, before running offstage to get "the machine". Crimson reappears, dancing for the body of Criss while the machine is brought out. Criss' body is then lifted from the ground, before being engulfed in CO_{2}. After the CO_{2} is blown away, we see Criss, whole again.
- The Dolls: Three dolls - Gigi, Taz and Charissa - appear, dancing seductively while they dress Criss.
- Doves: Criss does some sleight of hand with doves, before he disappears into a cloud of CO_{2}, reemerging with his own pair of wings. He levitates above the stage for a few moments, before disappearing into the stage.
- Poppy: Grit, a rabbit, appears on the stage and performs some contact juggling, while a large rabbit hops onstage to watch him. Two men dressed up as poppies come out and spin around, as a very large poppy is brought onstage. Suddenly, the poppy opens to reveal a beautiful woman clad in a white unitard. She performs some aerial acrobatics as Criss appears through a trapdoor in the middle of the stage. He stands on a platform made of thorns, staring up at the woman in awe, a hand clutching at his heart. The woman descends from her flower into Criss' arms. The two embrace before she gets off of the platform.
- Scarecrow: Two men in white, billowy skirts wave large white fans before Criss, hiding him from view. When he is show again, he is shouting in pain, as Crimson is crawling through his body. Kayala hides behind the Ushers, who urge her to save Criss. She goes to run offstage as Crimson exits Criss' body, but Crimson catches her and begins to strangle Kayala. Criss has escaped his thorny prison, and runs over with a large white cloth to protect Kayala. He makes Kayala vanish under the white cloth, as Crimson makes herself vanish under a red cloth. Criss rips the red cloth away to reveal a burning tree. He then runs offstage to follow Kayala.
- De Kolta Chair: The four Ushers appear on the dark stage with flashlights, looking for Criss. They come upon many rabbits, before Zangelica appears onstage with a baby carriage. The doll-sized Criss and Kayala appear from the carriage, before Lars picks up the smaller Criss and sits him on a chair. Lars and Maestro then lift a cloth over the chair, allowing Criss to reappear as normal. Maestro then begs him to perform his "favourite trick", the De Kolta chair. Kayala, a chair, and a large box are then brought onstage. Criss places a purple cape over Kayala, having her move her hands before she disappears. The box is then opened to reveal her.
- Danceoff: Multiple Moles appears onstage and begin to dance. Criss and Kayala run offstage as the Ushers begin to play Rock, Paper, Scissors to decide who will dance against the moles. Each dances in turn, the most notable being Lars breakdancing on his head.
- Tronik: Criss and Kayala return, and the Ushers begin to haggle them about their romance. Criss only smirks and replays that they "can kiss the monster", the monster being a lurking Tronik. Kayala runs offstage as Criss and Maestro run into the audience, Lars, Luigi and Slim running offstage to get whips and shields. Criss goes back onstage and defeats Tronik with magic. The creature staggers back for a moment, before regaining itself and heading toward Maestro, who cowers. The creature then removes its arms and torso, revealing Criss inside.
- Metamorphosis: Crimson appears onstage and begins to seduce Criss, along with partially undressing him. He is then thrown into a wooden crate, while Crimson and her minions writhe upon the stage, tying up the crate. Crimson then climbs atop it, hidden in a cloud of CO_{2} before a firewall goes off. Criss then appears atop the crate, and begins to open it, revealing a straight-jacketed Crimson inside.
- Wedding: Kayala is revealed, wearing a white wedding gown with a huge train following her. The Ushers come out to congratulate her as Criss is seen to appear atop the wall of the train. He then begins to walk down it, marrying Kayala after his descent. The two proceed to kiss as the Ushers pose for photographs. A large pool of blood begins to form on the gown's train, growing large with each flash of the camera. Finally, the gown is ripped from Kayala. A spotlight shines on Crimson and her paparazzi, before Criss is illuminated, Kayala lying on the ground next to him.
- Paparazzi: Criss and his Ushers fight to keep the paparazzi away from Kayala's lifeless form, the paparazzi dancing with Crimson before the wind blows them away. Criss mourns for Kayala before the Ushers take her away. A large projection of Crimson appears before Criss, knocking him to the ground.
- In Two: A large, mechanical-like table is rolled out, along with figures sharpening chainsaws on it. Criss is chased offstage by a Crowman, before one of the Dolls brings him back on and throws him upon the table. Crimson takes a chainsaw from one of her henchmen as Criss is bound and shackled to the table, before sawing him in half. Blood and gore spill out everywhere, each half of Criss' now-lifeless body pulled in separate directions offstage.
- Funeral: The Ushers come out and mourn over Criss, placing red roses on his grave. Crimson walks out with a Crowman and a wheelchair, spitting on Criss' grave before throwing her black rose on the ground. She is then covered by a blanket on the wheelchair and spun around so that she is no longer facing the audience. More mourners bestow roses upon Criss' grave as Kayala comes out in a black mourning gown, placing her white rose gently upon her beloved's grave. A large scrim comes down upon the stage before the wheelchair begins spinning. The figure seated removed the blanket, revealing Criss. He turns around to look at the characters of his surreal adventure, but the lights have gone dark and they are no longer visible. He then turns back to the audience, his whisper of "Believe" echoing throughout the theatre.

== Costumes ==
Mérédith Caron, costume designer, drew much inspiration from the 17th through the 19th centuries, including the Victorian era. The fabrics chosen reflected the themes of desire, seduction, and dreams. The many materials for the characters include linen, cotton netting, crushed velvet, jute, hemp, and crinyl. As an example, Kayala wears a bodice of black crinyl and organza train which is highly influenced by 18th-century decadence. The dolls, on the other hand, are inspired by 17th-century paintings and enlarged paisley patterns. Crimson is seen wearing a costume made of leather and "Mirror of Holland" linen. Her costume's skin effect was created by using two layers of linen covered by black netting which was slashed and sewn back together to give the impression of scars.

== Music ==
The official soundtrack for the show, by French composer Éric Serra, was released in late November 2010 exclusively through Cirque du Soleil's web store; the soundtrack can also be purchased at the official Believe store. The soundtrack is composed of the songs from the original variation of the show, with track listing as follows:

1. Homage to the Rabbits (Rabbit Dance)
2. The Life Factory
3. Sexy Pet (The Dolls)
4. Flying with the Birds
5. Kayala and the Poppies
6. Sympathy for Crimson
7. The Magic Door
8. The Cockroach Dance (The Moles)
9. In and Out of the Dream
10. Shadows and Whispers
11. Being Houdini I (Straight Jacket)
12. Being Houdini II
13. Prewed
14. Blow Me a Tornado
15. She is Gone to the Sky
16. The Magic Wedding

The song "Sexy Pet" also appears on the two-disc 25 compilation soundtrack.
