= The Lexi =

Hotel in Las Vegas, Nevada

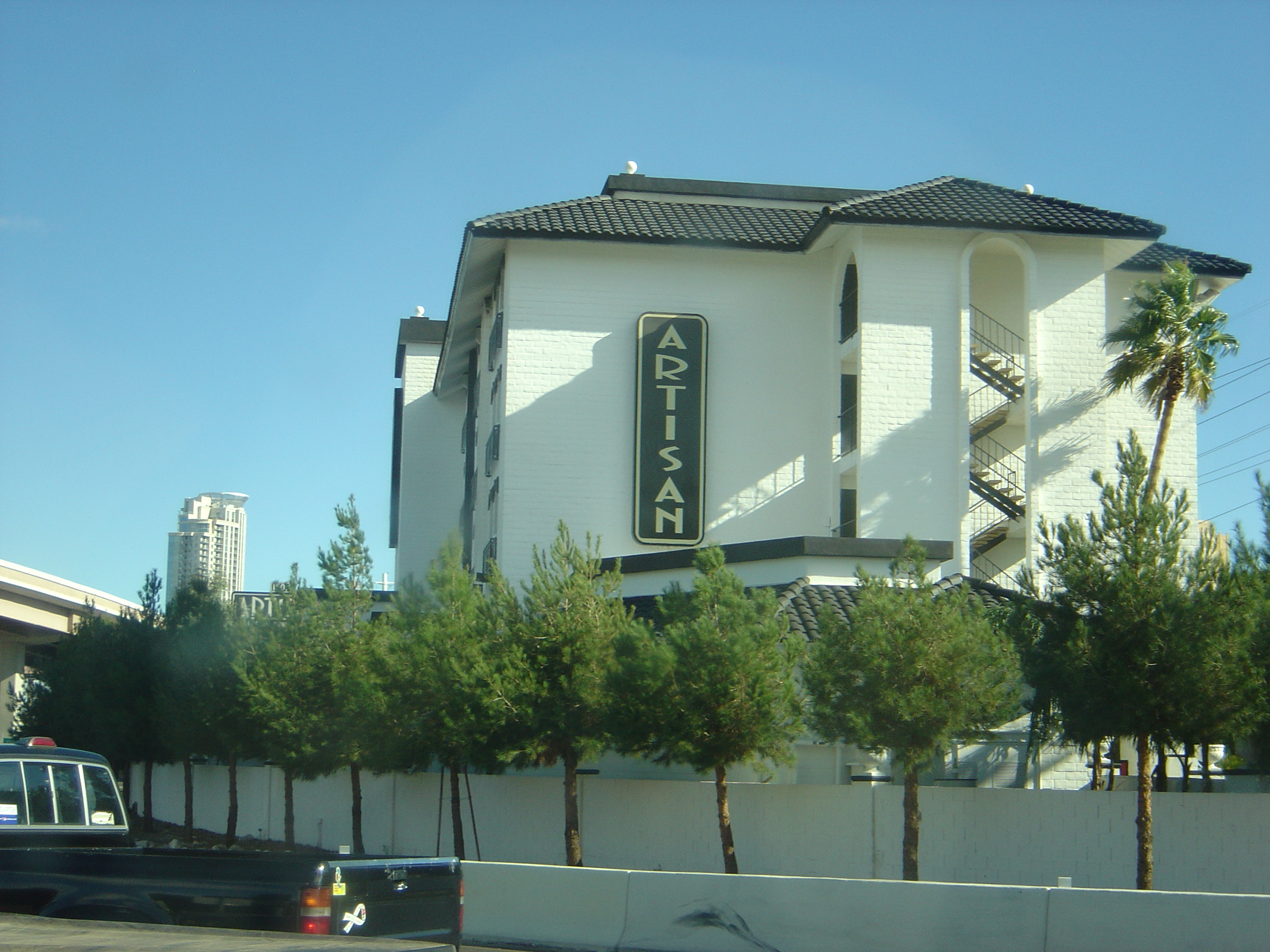
- The hotel in 2010, known then as the Artisan

General information
- Location: Las Vegas, Nevada, 1501 West Sahara Avenue
- Coordinates: 36°08′37.35″N 115°10′11.43″W
- Owner: Elevations Hotels and Resorts

Other information
- Number of rooms: 64
- Number of restaurants: 1

Website
- https://www.thelexilasvegas.com/

The Lexi is a boutique hotel in Las Vegas, Nevada. It is located west of the Las Vegas Strip and includes 64 rooms. It originally opened in September 1978, as the Las Vegas Inn and Casino, and later became a Travelodge. In 2001, it was purchased by Doug DaSilva, who overhauled it as the Artisan with a $4 million renovation.

The Siegel Group purchased the hotel in 2010, and sold it 12 years later to Elevations Hotels and Resorts. Following a $3 million renovation, the Artisan reopened as The Lexi on June 2, 2023. It is the first Las Vegas hotel to market itself as "cannabis-friendly", with consumption permitted on its fourth floor.

== History ==
The property is located at 1501 West Sahara Avenue, beside Interstate 15 and just west of the Las Vegas Strip. It initially opened in September 1978, as the Las Vegas Inn and Casino. It filed for Chapter 11 bankruptcy in 1984. The casino portion closed the following year, amid financial problems. The hotel became a Ramada in 1991, and later a Travelodge.

=== Artisan ===
Doug DaSilva purchased the Travelodge in late 2001 and renamed and overhauled it as The Artisan. Its 64 rooms were decorated with eclectic art and reproductions of famous paintings. Works by artists such as Cézanne, Chagall, Da Vinci, Rembrandt, Renoir, and Van Gogh were placed all over the property. By 2004, DaSilva stated that he had spent $4 million on renovations.

DaSilva experimented with entertainment options including rock music and murder mystery dinner theater, before settling on a lineup of jazz music centered on weekly appearances by keyboardist Ronnie Foster.

DaSilva planned for The Artisan to be the first of a chain of hotels, with locations to be opened in El Paso, Memphis, and Spokane.

In 2008, Las Vegas CityLife named the Artisan lounge as the best bar in Las Vegas.

Even though the property received good reviews and had a loyal clientele, it faced cash flow and maintenance problems, and entered Chapter 11 bankruptcy protection in December 2008. DaSilva claimed that the bankruptcy was intended only to allow the cancellation of a contract with a hotel reservation network, so that the property could join the Ascend Collection, a high-end hotel brand created by Choice Hotels International. A year later, however, the Artisan was still in bankruptcy, and it agreed to allow its mortgageholder, an affiliate of The Siegel Group, to foreclose. The Siegel Group closed its acquisition of the property in January 2010, and began working to correct the outstanding issues.

Siegel performed at least $1 million in renovations, and revamped the entertainment lineup to appeal to a broader range of local residents. In May 2010, The Artisan started holding themed invite-only pool parties. The Artisan also gained note for marketing a "buyout" option, allowing a patron to rent the entire property. In 2015, the Siegel Group briefly listed the hotel for sale for $4.6 million, before deciding instead to undertake another $1-million renovation.

=== The Lexi ===
In 2022, the Phoenix-based Pro Hospitality Group purchased the Artisan from the Siegel Group for $11.9 million. Pro Hospitality said that it would spend $3 million to renovate the Artisan, and hoped to make the property "cannabis-friendly". Pro Hospitality subsequently became Elevations Hotels and Resorts.

The Lexi opened on June 2, 2023, becoming the first hotel in Las Vegas to market itself as cannabis-friendly. State law allows cannabis consumption in a private place, including hotel rooms. Consumption at the Lexi is restricted to the fourth floor, which was equipped with filtration systems to prevent the spread and inhalation of marijuana smoke on other floors. Elevations described the allowance of on-site consumption as an added perk rather than a primary feature. The Lexi includes 64 rooms, a topless pool area, and a cocktail parlor known as the Artisan Lounge. There are plans to eventually add a cannabis lounge, which requires a state permit.

== In media ==
The Artisan was featured on a 2007 episode of the A&E TV show Criss Angel Mindfreak. It has also appeared on the Cinemax series Sin City Diaries.

In 2010, Kourtney Kardashian and boyfriend Scott Disick celebrated Disick's birthday at the Artisan in an episode of the reality series Keeping Up with the Kardashians.
