= Chokehold =

Submission hold that reduces air or blood flow

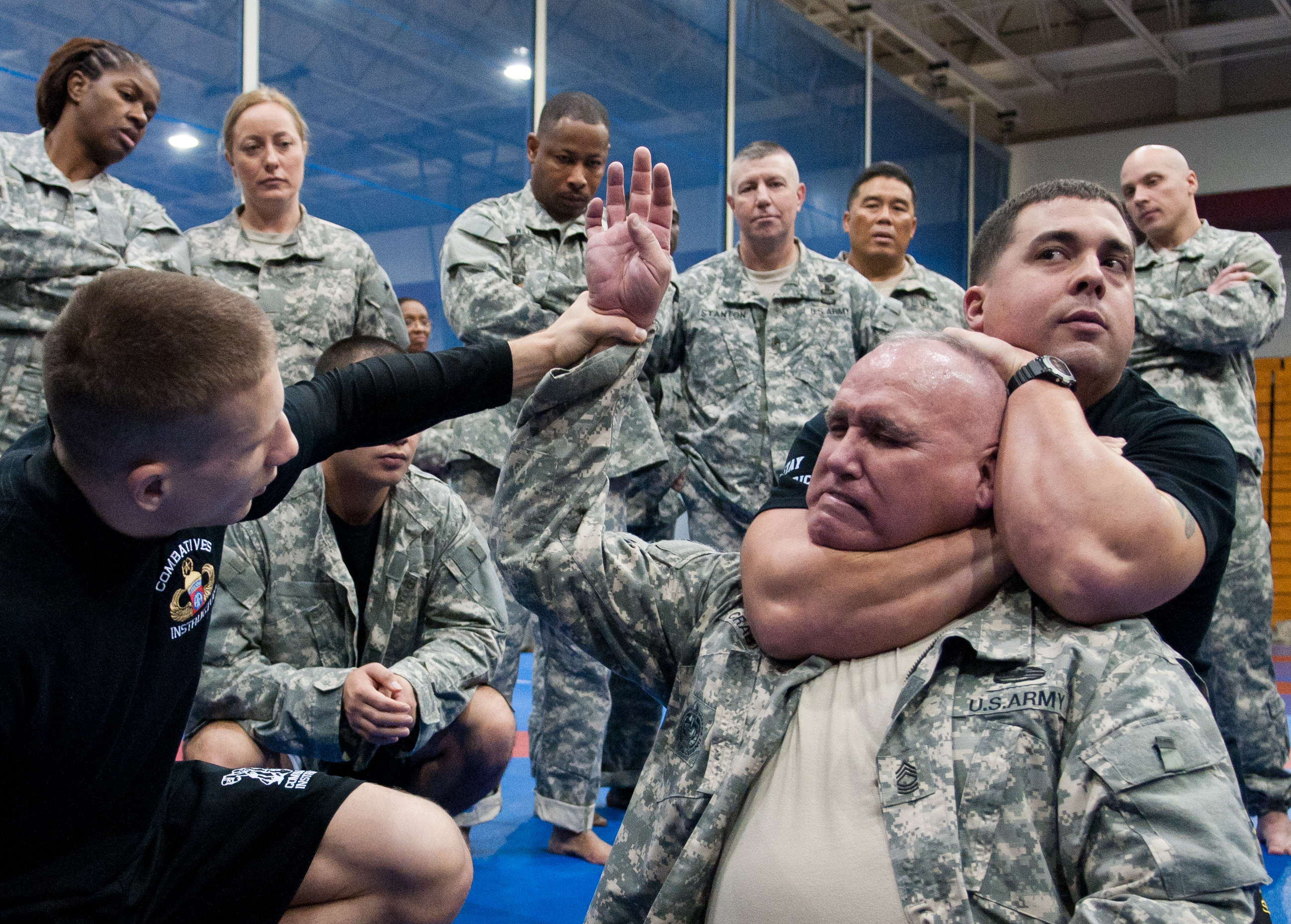
- Rear naked choke between two US soldiers.
- Style: Brazilian jiu-jitsu, judo, sambo
- AKA: Choke, stranglehold, shime-waza

A chokehold, choke, stranglehold or, in Judo, shime-waza (Japanese: 絞技, lit. 'constriction technique') is a general term for a grappling hold that critically reduces or prevents either air (choking) or blood (strangling) from passing through the neck of an opponent. The restriction may be of one or both and depends on the hold used and the reaction of the victim. While the time it takes for the choke to render an opponent unconscious varies depending on the type of choke, the average across all has been recorded as 9 seconds.

The lack of blood or air often leads to unconsciousness or even death if the hold is maintained. Chokeholds are used in martial arts, combat sports, self-defense, law enforcement and in military hand to hand combat applications. They are considered superior to brute-force manual strangling, which generally requires a large disparity in physical strength to be effective. Rather than using the fingers or arms to attempt to crush the neck, chokeholds effectively use leverage such as figure-four holds or collar holds that use the clothes to assist in the constriction.

The terminology used varies; in most martial arts, the term "chokehold" or "choke" is used for all types of grappling holds that strangle. This can be misleading as most holds aim to strangle not choke with the exception of "air chokes" (choking means "to have severe difficulty in breathing because of a constricted or obstructed throat or a lack of air"). In Judo terminology, "blood chokes" are referred to as "strangleholds" or "strangles" while "air chokes" are called "chokeholds" or "chokes". In forensics, the terms "strangle" and "stranglehold" designate any type of neck compression, while in law-enforcement they are referred to as "neck holds".

== Air choke ==
An air choke (or tracheal choke) specifically refers to a "true" choke that compresses the upper airway (trachea, larynx or laryngopharynx), hence interfering with breathing and leading to asphyxia. Although less effective at inducing unconsciousness than its vascular counterpart, the air choke causes excruciating pain and air hunger, and in combat sports a fighter will usually yield to such a submission hold. Air chokes have been associated with fractures of the larynx or hyoid bone, and are considered less safe than blood chokes to practice.

== Blood choke ==
Blood chokes (also known as sleeper holds or carotid restraints) are a form of strangulation that compress one or both carotid arteries and/or the jugular veins without compressing the airway, hence causing cerebral ischemia and a temporary hypoxic condition in the brain. Compared to strangulation with the hands, properly applied blood chokes require little physical strength.

== Use in combat sports ==
Most chokeholds featured in combat sports and martial arts are blood chokes, although some air chokes or combinations occur as well. Blood chokes, especially the rear naked choke, triangle chokes, or gi chokes, are commonly used as submission holds in Brazilian jiu-jitsu. In judo, chokeholds, known as shime-waza, are often subject to restrictions based on age or rank. Chokeholds are not allowed in sport sambo but are allowed in combat sambo. The chokeholds used in catch wrestling and shoot wrestling are the inspiration for the "chokeholds" in modern professional wrestling performances. Due to the effectiveness of chokeholds and their popularity in a wide variety of martial arts, they are most often used to force submissions in mixed martial art and submission grappling competitions.

Some martial arts include instruction on kappo, resuscitation techniques to heal a fighter choked to unconsciousness.

== Use in law enforcement (lateral vascular neck restraint) ==
Anaheim P.D. bodycam footage of Vincent Valenzuela Jr. entering coma due to chokehold in July 2016, hosted on LiveLeak.

In law enforcement the goal is to force an uncooperative subject to submit without causing death or permanent injury. In this situation it is vital to distinguish between air and blood chokes. A hold that simultaneously blocks both the left and right carotid arteries results in cerebral ischemia and loss of consciousness within seconds. If properly applied, the hold produces almost immediate cessation of resistance. However to avoid injury the hold cannot be maintained more than a few seconds. When pressure on the carotids is released, the flow of oxygenated blood resumes immediately and consciousness slowly returns. In contrast, if the airway rather than the carotid arteries is blocked, the subject will remain conscious and may continue to struggle for a minute or more; they will lose consciousness only when the oxygen in the circulating blood is consumed and they collapse from hypoxia. Even if the hold is released at this point, the blood circulating through the brain contains no oxygen, and consequently the subject may not regain consciousness or resume spontaneous breathing. Possibly the most important element of training for the use of chokeholds in law enforcement is the understanding that the subject should always be able to breathe freely. The operator uses their right arm to compress both sides of the subject's neck, assisted by the pressure of their left hand, while the elbow, sharply flexed and centered over the midline, places no pressure on the trachea.

Following a series of choking deaths, the Los Angeles Police Department banned chokeholds in 1980, and was soon followed by police departments nationwide. Choking suspects was widely banned by American police departments by the early 1990s, when New York City strengthened the force of an earlier ban on chokeholds. (It is also forensically known as a "carotid sleeper".)

Despite the ban, in 2014, NYPD police killed Eric Garner by administering the prohibited hold. Garner was assaulted on suspicions of selling cigarettes without tax stamps, although he was not doing so. While being in the chokehold and restrained by multiple officers, he repeated the words "I can't breathe" 11 times while lying face down on the sidewalk. Garner lost consciousness and died approximately an hour later; his autopsy revealed that his death was a result of "[compression] of neck, compression of chest and prone positioning during physical restraint by police." His death and quote became a prominent factor of Black Lives Matter protests, a social movement originating in 2013 and becoming most popular during the George Floyd protests in 2020 following his murder by Minneapolis police officer Derek Chauvin. In response, the George Floyd Justice in Policing Act of 2021 was introduced, part of its statutes including prohibiting federal police officers from using chokeholds or other carotid holds, along with state and local law enforcement agencies that receive federal funding.

== Types ==
- Anaconda choke – Choke starting with attacker facing the opponent on all fours. Attacker passes his leading arm under the neck, and outside past one of the opponent's arms while then grabbing his own other arm's free arm biceps (resulting in similar arm positioning to a rear naked choke). The attacker then arches his back, bending backward to apply the choke.
- Arm triangle choke – Choke starting with the attacker facing the opponent. The attacker passes the arm over the opponents same-side shoulder and across the back to the other shoulder. The attacker then positions the opponents arm across their neck and traps it using their head and applies pressure. May be performed from the top, or the bottom.
- D'arce choke – the D'Arce choke, also known as the Brabo choke, is similar to the anaconda choke, the main divergence being the choking arm is threaded under the near arm, in front of the opponent's neck, and on top of the far arm.
- Ezekiel choke – Attacker grabs inside their own sleeve around opponent's neck.
- Gogoplata – Performed from full guard by using an omoplata setup to trap the top man's arm, then pulling the bottom man's foot past the top man's head, pressing the shin of that leg against the throat. The bottom man then pulls on his opponent's head, cutting off the airflow and forcing him to submit or risk passing out from lack of oxygen.
- Guillotine – Applied in front of and above the opponent, the attacker restricts air flow by lifting the forearm into the neck. A common finishing hold in mixed martial arts.
- North–south choke – Applied from the north-south position with opponent facing up. Uses the shoulder and biceps to cut off air flow.
- Rear naked choke – Applied from behind the opponent, starting by looping one arm around the neck so that the crook of the elbow is under the opponents chin, then placing the hand of that arm on the opposite biceps. The other hand is then placed on the back of the opponent's head and pushes the opponent's head and neck forward into the crook of the flexed arm. Additional pressure may be applied by pinioning the opponent's lower body by locking the legs around the opponent's waist (referred to as "hooks") and arching the back to place more force against the neck. A simple and effective chokehold, it is the most common finishing hold in mixed martial arts competition.
- Triangle choke – Applied from full guard or from mount, the opponent's neck is trapped in a triangle formed by their own arm and the attacker's thigh and calf. A common finishing hold in mixed martial arts.
- Peruvian necktie – the arms of the person applying the choke are laced around the neck with the opponent's bottom arm straight through the hold, the person applying then turns the opponent around, and drapes his legs over the back, applying the pressure to the choke.
- Von Flue choke – Alternatively known as the Saint Preux choke or Von Preux Choke, this choke is mostly used in MMA, and some rare instances in wrestling. Because of the rarity of its use, it is often overlooked in its effectiveness. The choke is applied with the opponent in a supine position, with his back against the mat. The person applying then laces his closest arm around the back of the head, and places his entire body weight against the neck, causing both air constriction, and restriction of blood flow to the brain. Prolonged applying of this hold can result in loss of consciousness, either due to loss of blood flow to the brain, or loss of air to the lungs. The choke gets its name from Jason Von Flue, who spearheaded the move, as well as Ovince Saint Preux, who popularised it within the UFC. He also won 4 fights using the method, when there have ever only been 8 finishes by Von Flue chokes in the UFC.
- Bulldog choke – The bulldog choke is a catch wrestling strangulation. The bulldog choke works the same as a rear naked choke, except it occurs on the side of the opponent, not behind. The attacker's biceps will block one side of the neck and the forearm will block the other. For loss of consciousness to occur, the structure need to be compressed.

== Grips ==
One powerful way to grasp the arms together when doing front headlocks is the Gable grip. Named after wrestler Dan Gable, it involves clasping the hands together, palm to palm, at a ninety degree angle, with thumbs tucked in.

== See also ==
- Choking game
- Choke-out
- Compression lock
- Grapple tackle
- Joint lock
