= Choke-out =

Hand-to-hand combat tactic

A choke-out is a hand-to-hand combat tactic involving the use of a chokehold to cause syncope, or temporary loss of consciousness, at which point the choke is released. Common chokeholds in grappling used to accomplish a choke-out include the rear naked choke, arm triangle, triangle choke, and the guillotine.

The mechanism can be explained as resulting from directly constraining blood flow to the brain through constriction of the carotid arteries. An additional mechanism involves compression of the baroreceptors of the carotid arteries, confusing the body into thinking blood pressure has risen. Due to the baroreflex, this inhibits sympathetic vasomotor and cardiac stimulation and increases parasympathetic stimulation of the heart causing vasodilation and a lowered heart rate. This causes a dramatic decrease in blood flow especially to regions above the heart (e.g. the brain) due the need of a high pressure to flow against gravity which in turn results in less blood flow to the brain (brain ischemia), which then causes loss of consciousness. These explanations, however, do not exclude each other but are 2 components explaining less blood flow to the brain: 1) constriction of carotid arteries leading blood towards the brain directly causing less blood flow to the brain 2) lower systemic blood pressure (thereby also decreasing blood flow to the brain through the vertebral arteries - these being the only alternative blood supply to the brain).

Choke-outs should not be confused with erotic asphyxiation or the fainting game, wherein a person loses consciousness intentionally in order to experience a particular sensation. A choke-out should also not be confused with medical conditions that cause fainting without the application of a chokehold.

== Mechanics ==
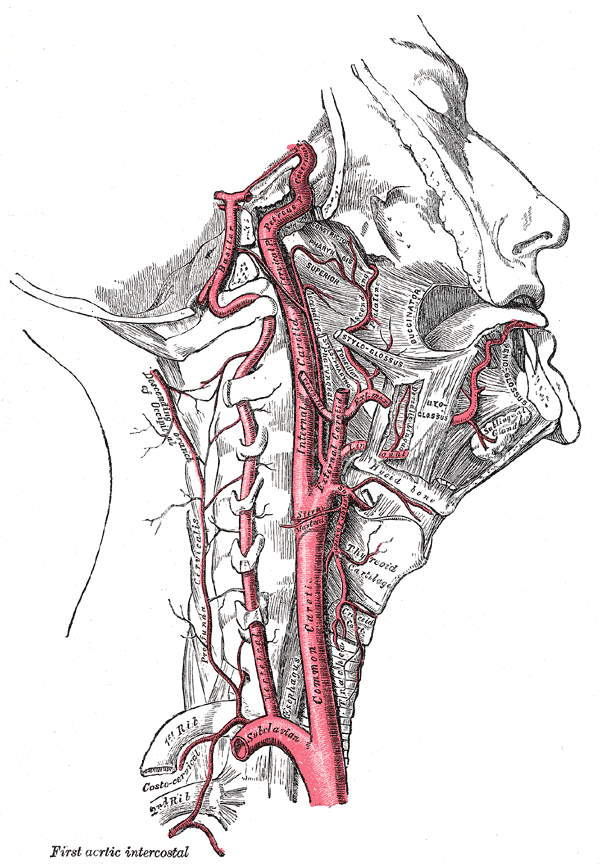
The vulnerable carotid artery, (large, red tube), and the vagus nerve running parallel on its left

Chokeholds can be divided into two primary categories: "blood chokes" and "air chokes". A blood choke disrupts blood circulation to the brain, while an air choke disrupts breathing. Blood chokes can be applied to efficiently cause loss of consciousness, i.e. a choke-out, while air chokes do not usually cause loss of consciousness without prolonged application (though air chokes are used to cause discomfort).

Blood chokes constrain or disrupt blood circulation to the brain. This is accomplished by compressing one or both of the carotid arteries and/or the jugular veins, ideally with little to no pressure applied to the airway. However, it is very rare and difficult to accomplish by compressing only one side.

Unconsciousness results mainly from the direct constraint of blood flow to the brain, causing cerebral hypoxia.

An additional explanation is seen in the introduction and is caused by the baroreceptor reflex. This explains why fainting can also happen with just a very short application of force as this can cause systemic blood pressure to drop dramatically in some people thereby lowering the blood flow to the brain even after release of the constrictive force on the carotid arteries.

== Dangers ==
The long-term effects of a controlled choke-out for less than 4 minutes (as most are applied for mere seconds and released when unconsciousness is achieved) are disputed, but the 5 minute mark is largely considered unsafe. There is always risk of short-term memory loss, hemorrhage and harm to the retina, concussions from falling when unconscious, stroke, seizures, permanent brain damage, coma, and even death.

Some argue that when pressure is applied to the carotid artery, the baroreceptors send a signal to the brain via the glossopharyngeal nerve and the heart via the vagus nerve. This signal tells the heart to reduce volume of blood per heartbeat, typically up to one-third, in order to further relieve high pressure. There is a slight chance of the rate dropping to zero, or flatline (asystole). However, there are several studies that showed choking out will result in a few seconds of flat line ECG for a few seconds at least in half of the subjects. This might suggest that choking out or syncope is not as safe as it was assumed to be previously.

Some argue that with thousands of tournaments since the sport of Judo began in 1882, hundreds of thousands of chokes have been applied, and the probability of hundreds if not thousands of choke-outs, with no reported deaths due to chokes, the chances of asystole are slim. It might be true that no direct deaths have been reported as a result of chokes, but there are numerous reports of these chokes turning out to be strokes, leaving the subject with permanent brain damage or possibly more elaborate, long-term effects

== Effects ==
The American Neurological Association's study entitled "Syncope: A videometric analysis of 56 episodes of transient cerebral hypoxia" observed the effects of cerebral hypoxia on 42 test subjects who completely lost consciousness. Their syncope state lasted 12.1 seconds, plus or minus 4.4 seconds. Muscle jerks occurred in 90% of patients. The most common pattern of movement consisted of multifocal arrhythmic jerks (uncoordinated spasms of multiple muscle groups) in both proximal and distal muscles. Additional movements also occurred such as: righting movements (if the patient had slumped one way while falling asleep they woke up and immediately corrected, if not overcorrected), oral automatisms, and head turns. In most of the patients their eyes remained open. Sixty percent of the patients reported having visual and auditory hallucinations.
