= Back mount =

Grappling position

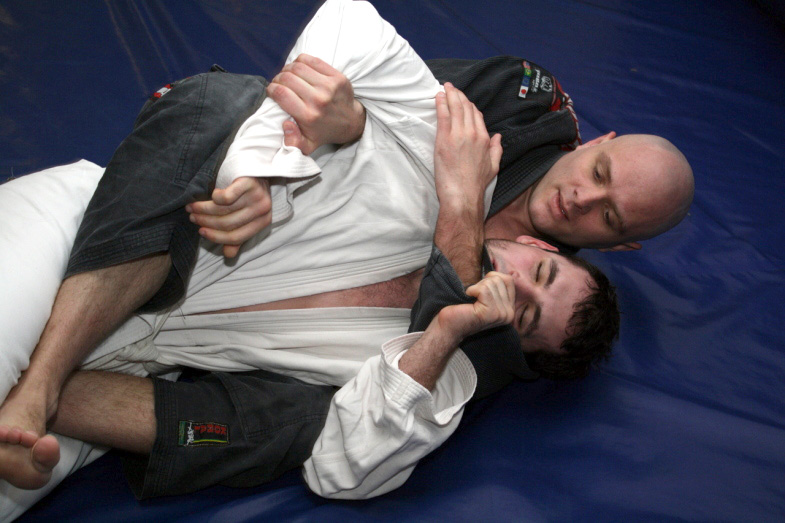
- Classification: Position
- Style: Brazilian Jiu-Jitsu
- AKA: Rear mount

Back mount, or rear mount (often confused with back control), is a dominant grappling position where the practitioner is on their opponent's back in such a way that they have control of their opponent (in back control, the practitioner controls their opponent from the back in any position that is not atop). Ideally, the opponent will be recumbent (prone), while the practitioner centers their weight atop the opponent, either in a seated or recumbent posture. Many consider back mount to be a very dominant, perhaps even the most advantageous position in grappling. This is due to the practitioner being able to attack with strikes and submissions with the opponent having a severely limited ability to see incoming attacks and defend against them.

== Offense ==
In order to prevent the opponent from escaping the back mount, the position must have stability. This is generally accomplished by utilizing the practitioner's own legs to hook the inside of the opponent's thighs, (commonly called hooks) while holding the opponent's neck or arms to maintain chest-to-back contact. Such a position can be very difficult to escape. The opponent may attempt to roll, but the hooks and chest-to-back contact will allow the practitioner to roll with the opponent. The practitioner that has the back mount is in a very advantageous position. He can strike with punches, elbows and headbutts, or alternatively attempt a rear naked choke, various collar-chokes as well as armlocks.

== Defense ==
It is nearly impossible to attack an opponent who is mounted directly behind one's back. If the opponent does not have the legs hooked or chest to back contact, it is possible to roll into the mount; although this does not improve the positioning much, it is at least possible to see and block the opponent's strikes from the mounted position. If the opponent has the legs hooked in, those hooks need to be removed, for instance by pulling them out using the arms. Once they have been removed, there is an increase in mobility, making it possible to wriggle into the mount, or try to turn and entangle a leg into a half guard. Using the arms to pull out the hooks, however, leaves one's neck open to the rear naked choke. There are effective positional methods of escaping the back mount.

To remove chest to back contact, the mounted opponent can grab an attacker's wrist with two hands and move it over their head to the other side. If the mounted opponent is much larger/stronger than the mounting fighter, they may actually be able to stand up and slam his opponent into a nearby wall or fall backwards onto their back (and opponent). Doing this with enough force may knock the wind out of the dominant opponent, or at least enable one to break free.

Another standard escape involves the mounted opponent touching their head to the ground to temporarily prevent against a choke while also attempting to roll into the dominant opponent's guard. Alternatively, while basing with the head on the ground, the mounted opponent can use their legs or arms to remove one of the hooks to make rolling into the guard easier.

If the mounting opponent has their ankles crossed while holding the rear mount (similar to the positioning in closed guard), the opponent being mounted can use a Figure 4 leglock to apply a submission against the dominant fighter. This can result in a tapout or possible injury, depending on the circumstances. Generally, opponents skilled in ground fighting will not cross their ankles or not cross them long enough to allow this to happen.
