= Hooks (grappling) =

Grappling technique in martial arts

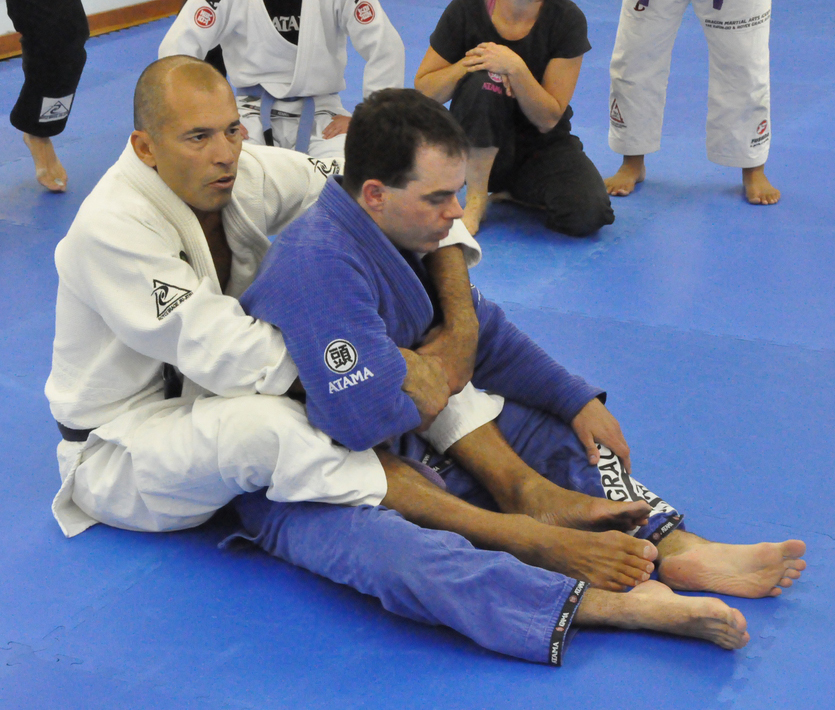
- Royce Gracie (white gi) demonstrates a secure rear mount with hooks on his opponent.
- Classification: Grappling
- Style: Judo, Brazilian Jiu-Jitsu, Wrestling
- Parent hold: Back Mount
- Child hold(s): Body triangle

Hooks is a term in grappling martial arts that generally refers to the use of careful positioning of a practitioner’s feet and legs to control and manipulate the movement or position of their opponent. One of the most common uses of hooks is in the back control position to prevent escape. However, a practitioner may alternatively use hooks to defend, sweep, or attack their opponent.

== Uses ==
Hooks are very important tools in the arsenal of a grappler. The effective use of the feet to manipulate the position of the opponent is essential to maintaining control of one's opponent. Both in offensive and defensive situations, locking in hooks gives an advantage of more points of contact with the opponent. This in turn increases the ability to impose submissions, and the ability to avoid them.

=== Offense ===
Offensive uses of hooks include the control of an opponent until the application of a submission hold, as with the Back mount position where the practitioner applies hooks to his opponent's thighs until he opts to apply a submission from the back, a very commonly used submission is the Rear naked choke. In some cases, hooks are used to apply the submissions itself, as with the Gogoplata submission where the hook is applied to the opponent's throat as a choke.

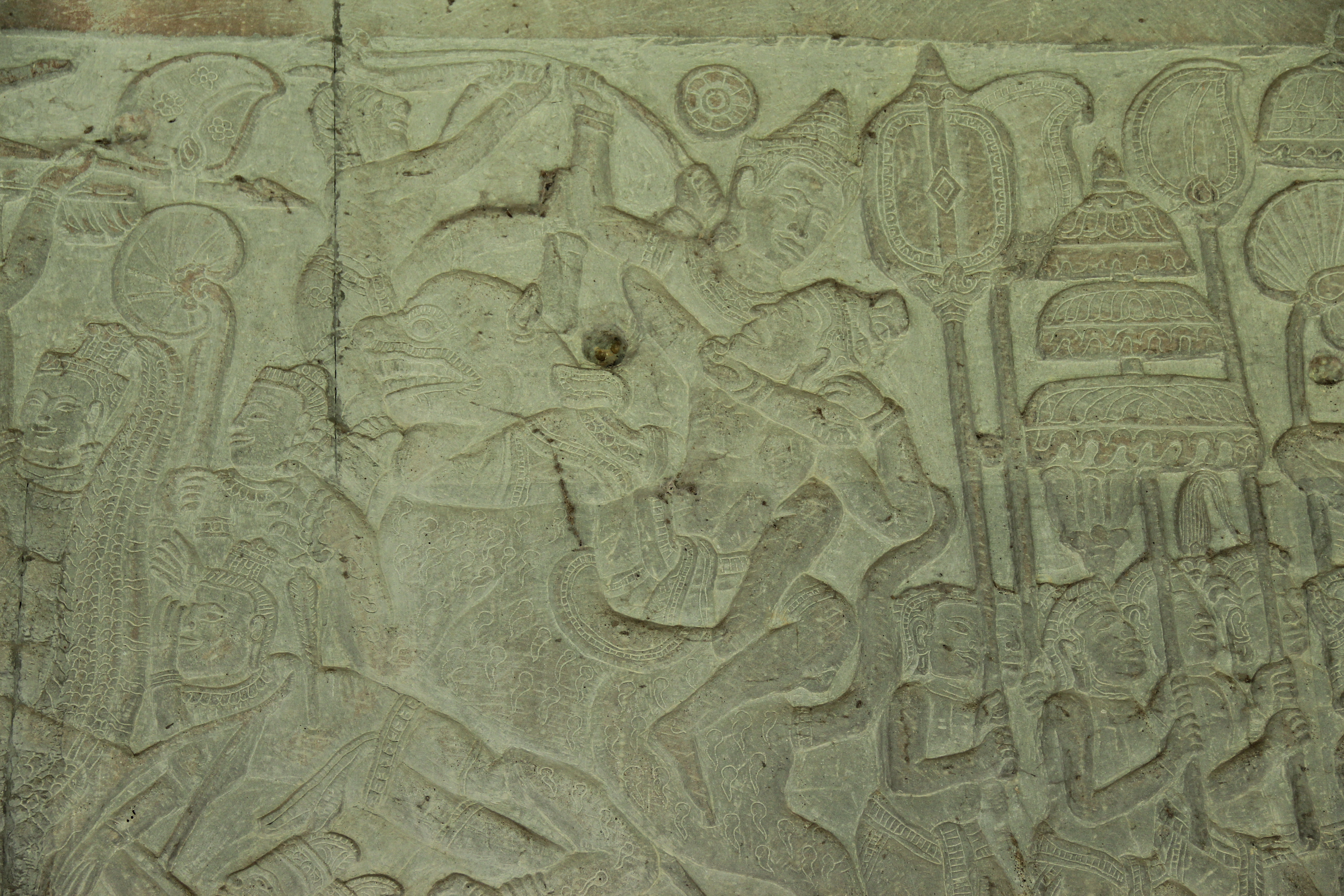
Leg hook and locking technique. Bas-relief at Angkor Wat.

=== Defense ===
The use of hooks in defense consists of the practitioner using their feet to limit the advancement of their opponent as with the Half guard position, sweeping their opponent as seen with the Butterfly guard, and using hooks to counterattack opponents.

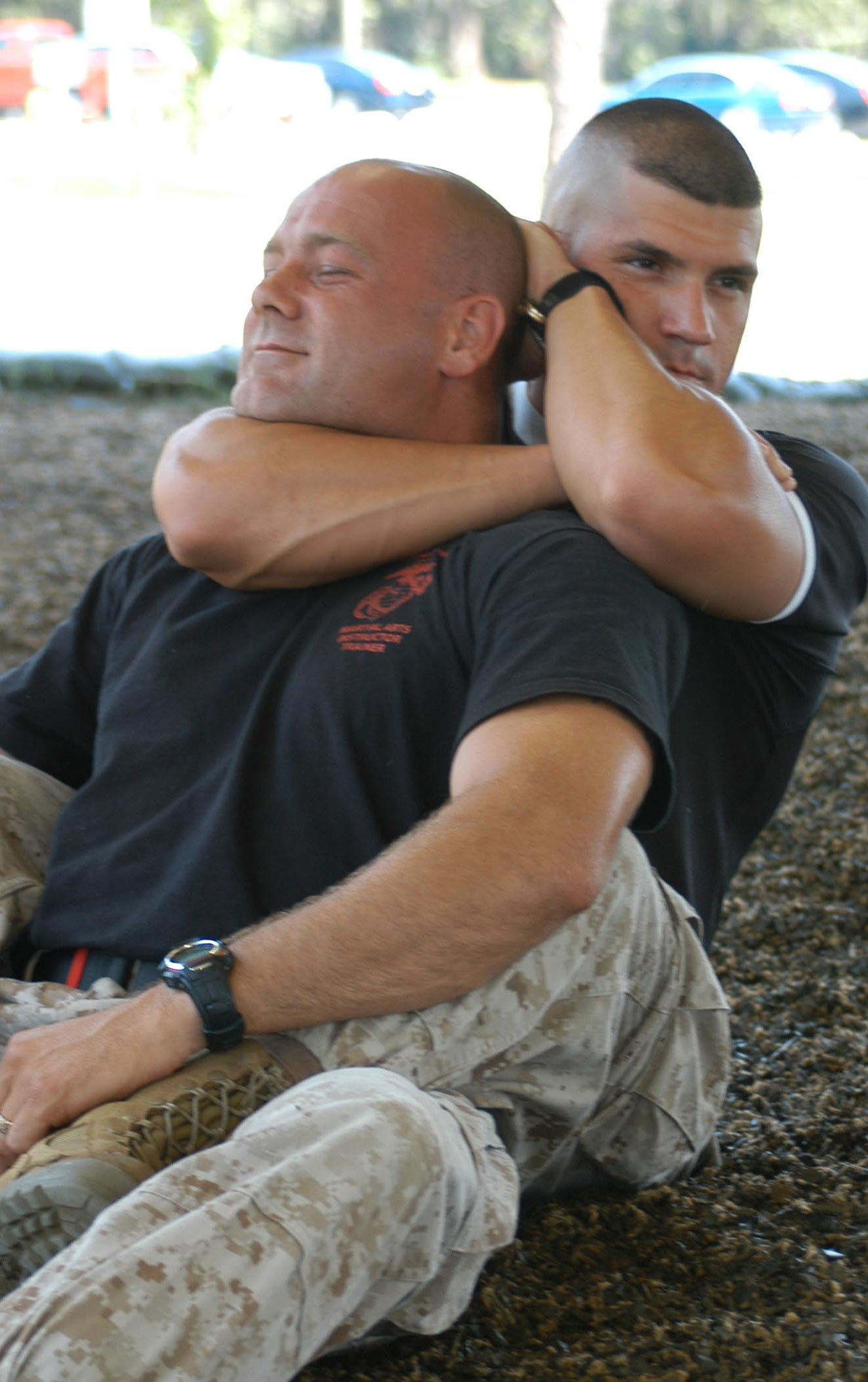
Leg hook in MCMAP and rear naked choke

== Positions and applications ==
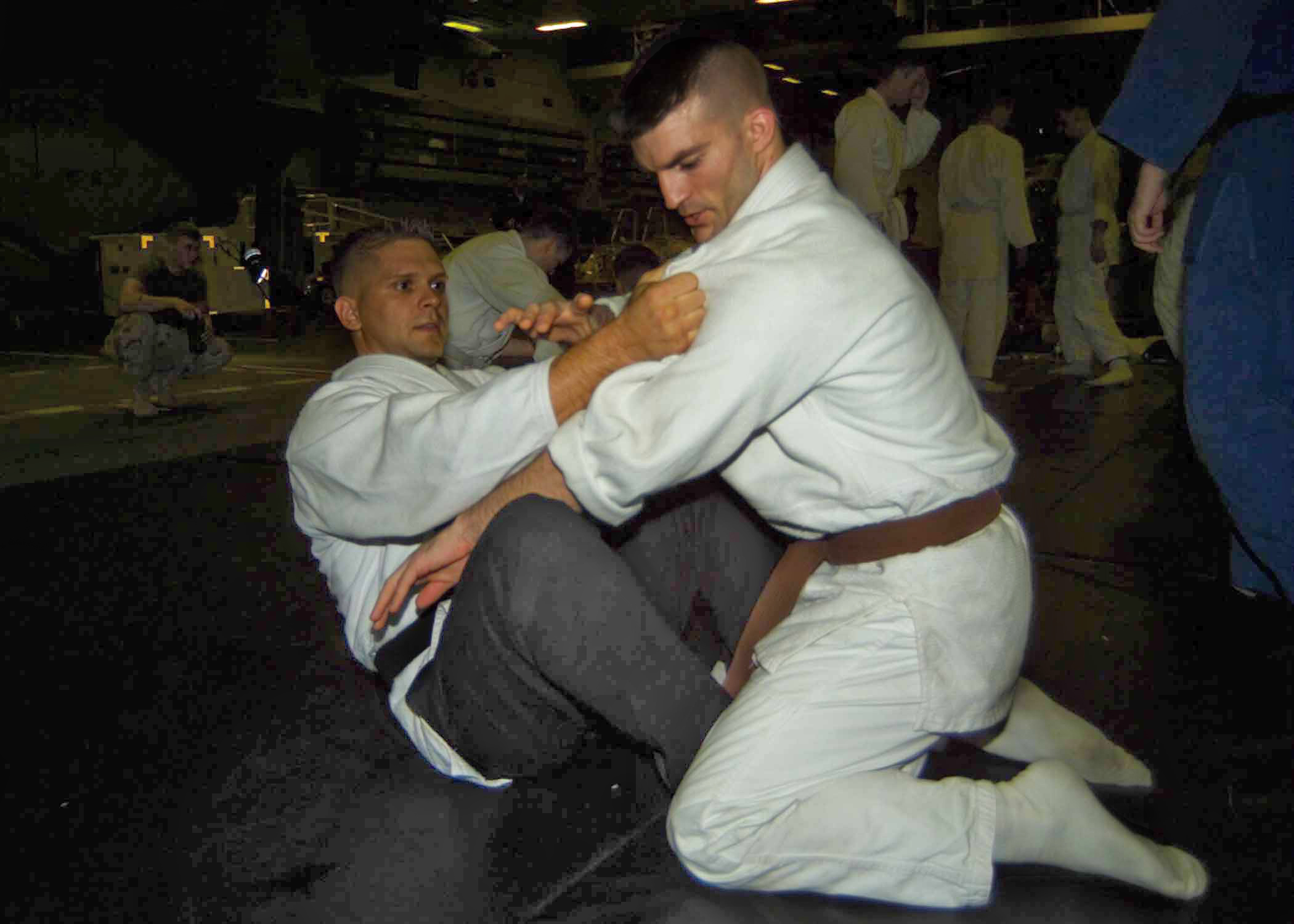
Judoka using butterfly guard during training. Notice the use of butterfly hooks on inside of thighs

- Back / Rear mount - Hooks are locked into opponent's mid-thighs to prevent the opponent from escaping or reversing the position, hooks are also used in this position to add leverage to chokes.
- Full mount - Hooks are locked below the calves of the opponent to increase downward pressure, they are also used to help base to prevent sweeps.
- Butterfly guard - Butterfly hooks are locked in the inner thigh of opponent, and are used to keep opponent off balance. They also can be used to sweep an opponent, in order to advance to a more dominant position. Butterfly hooks are generally used in tandem with some combination of overhooks and/or underhooks to secure the butterfly guard.
- Half guard - Hooks are locked on one leg of the opponent to prevent them from advancing to full mount or side control, generally a last defensive position before the opponent gains a dominant position, such as side control or full mount.
- Open guard - Hooks are generally moving and are not locked as in other positions, can be in several locations including, but not limited to, crook of the elbow, the hips, shin or calf, ribcage of the opponent, etc. In this position hooks are flexible and aid the practitioner in attempting sweeps, preventing guard passes or blocking strikes.
- Spider guard Hooks are generally locked against arms of opponent to prevent strikes and limit guard passing, sometimes used to set up shoulder and armlocks. Spider guard also uses hooks to control other areas but this is one of the most common.
- X-guard - Hooks are locked in opposition around one leg (creating the X shape for which the position is named), while the practitioner traps the other leg with his arm. Hooks change position to sweep the opponent in different directions, giving the practitioner the ability to vary his attacks and set up several submission attempts.

== Related techniques ==
When the strategy of limiting the opponent’s movements is applied with the hands and arms rather than the feet and legs, generally in a Clinch fighting situation, it is referred to as Underhook(s) or Overhook(s), depending on the position of the practitioner’s arm(s) in relation to their opponent’s arm(s).
