= Rear naked choke =

Martial arts technique

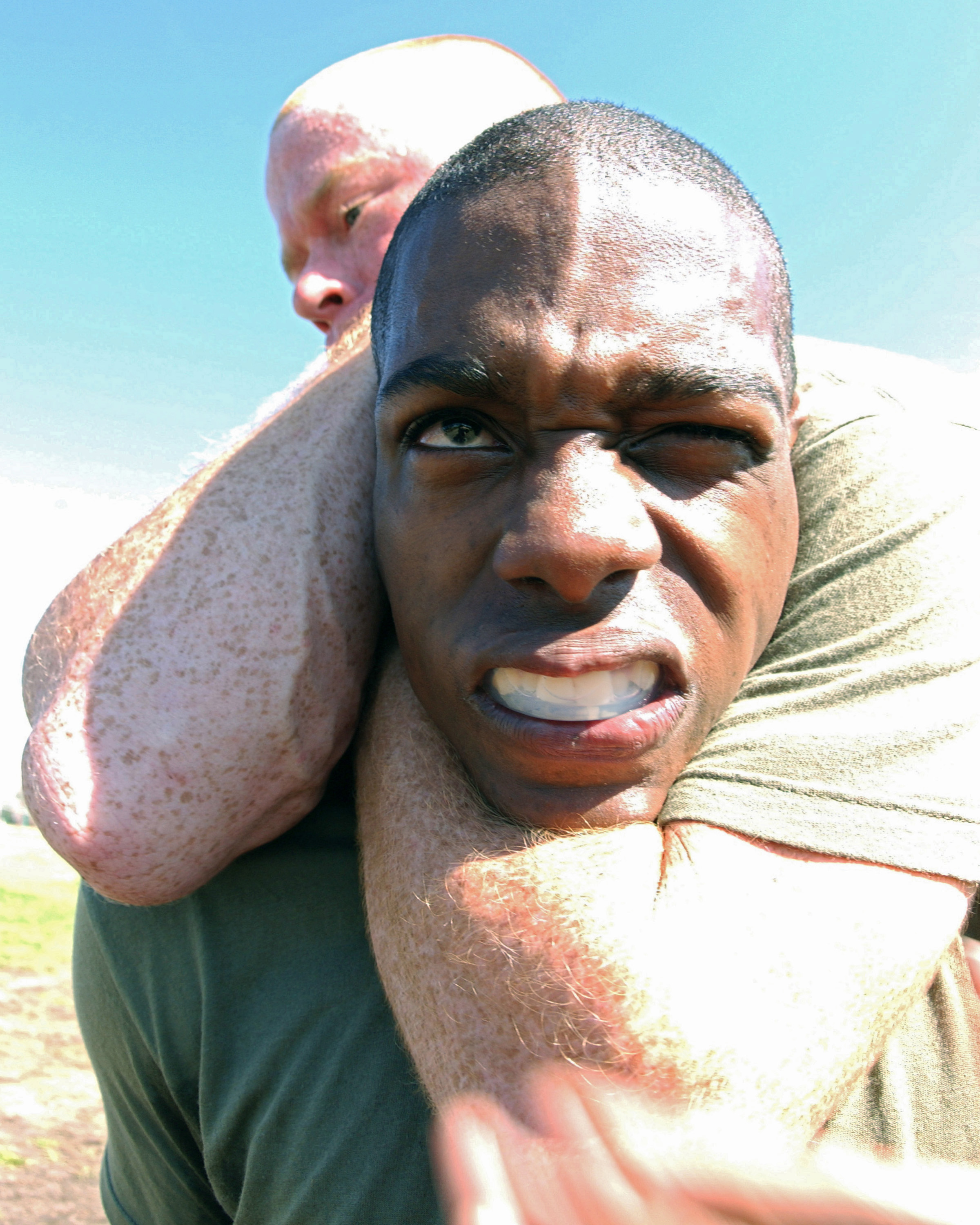
US Marines demonstrate the rear-naked choke.

The rear naked choke (RNC), is a chokehold in martial arts applied from an opponent's back. The word naked in this context refers to the fact that this hold does not involve the use of a keikogi ("gi") or training uniform. (Note: Miller, C. (2016). Submission fighting and the rules of ancient greek wrestling. Quotation: "It is called ‘naked’ since it is the one strangulation in Judo which does not require a grip on the uniform.") The technique is also known as hadaka jime (裸絞, "naked choke") in Japanese martial arts and mata leão ("lion killer") in Brazilian jiu-jitsu.

The choke has two variations: in one version, the attacker's arm encircles the opponent's neck and then grabs their biceps/shoulder on the other arm (see below for details); in the second version, the attacker clasps their hands together instead after encircling the opponent's neck. Recent studies have shown that the rear-naked choke takes an average of 8.9 seconds to render an opponent unconscious, regardless of the grip that is used.

== "Figure four" or "short" variation ==
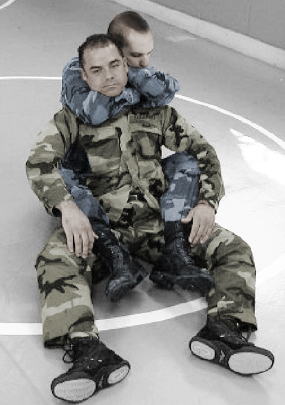
Soldier executing a figure-four variant with hooks.

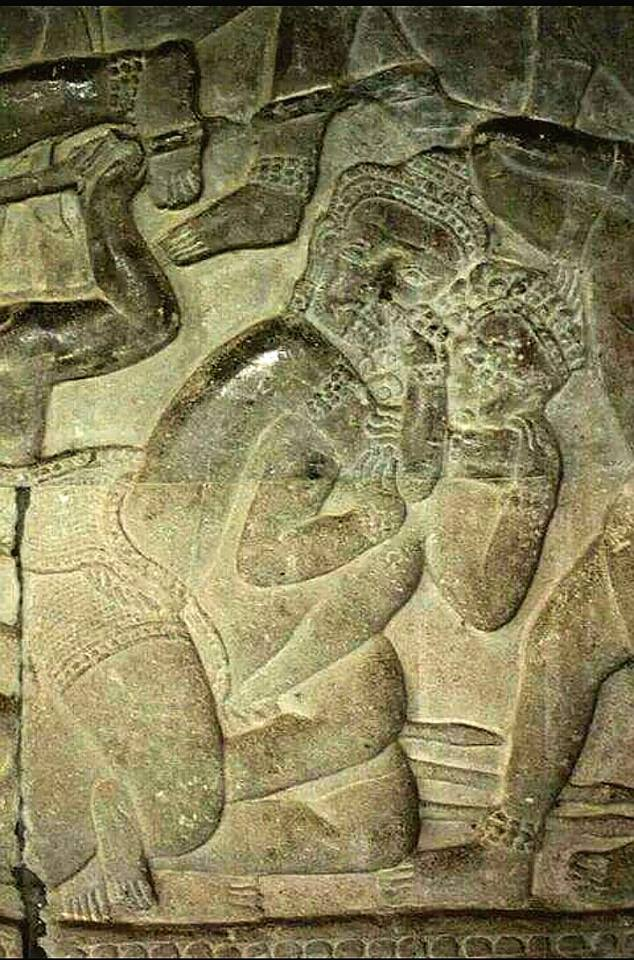
Khmer bas relief of rear naked choke hold with a Body triangle (grappling).

This variant is a blood choke because it restricts blood flow to the brain via the carotid arteries. When applied correctly, it can cause temporary unconsciousness in a few seconds (however, it can also be used to damage the trachea, larynx and hyoid bone as well as other parts of the neck and produce a neck crank by compressing the front of the neck and pulling upwards into the chin). The following is a description of this technique using the right arm (the same can be done with the left arm, changing roles of the choking and securing arms):

1. The attacker's right arm encircles the opponent's neck, with the opponent's trachea at the crook of the elbow.
2. The attacker's right hand then grasps their upper left arm/shoulder.
3. The left hand is placed behind (or occasionally on top of) the opponent's head. A more effective form of the choke can be applied by placing the palm of the left hand against the attacker's shoulder rather than behind the opponent's head. This greatly reduces the escape possibilities.
4. The elbows are then brought together and the elbow crook pulled in such that pressure, from the biceps and radius bone, is applied to the neck on both sides and the front and back.

When applied properly, unconsciousness occurs in less than 10 seconds, and recovery from the choke is just as quick. The choke can be applied with only one arm, either standing, kneeling/sitting, or lying down, leaving the other arm free to grapple or strike the opponent.

== "Body lock" or "hooks" variations on the usage of legs ==
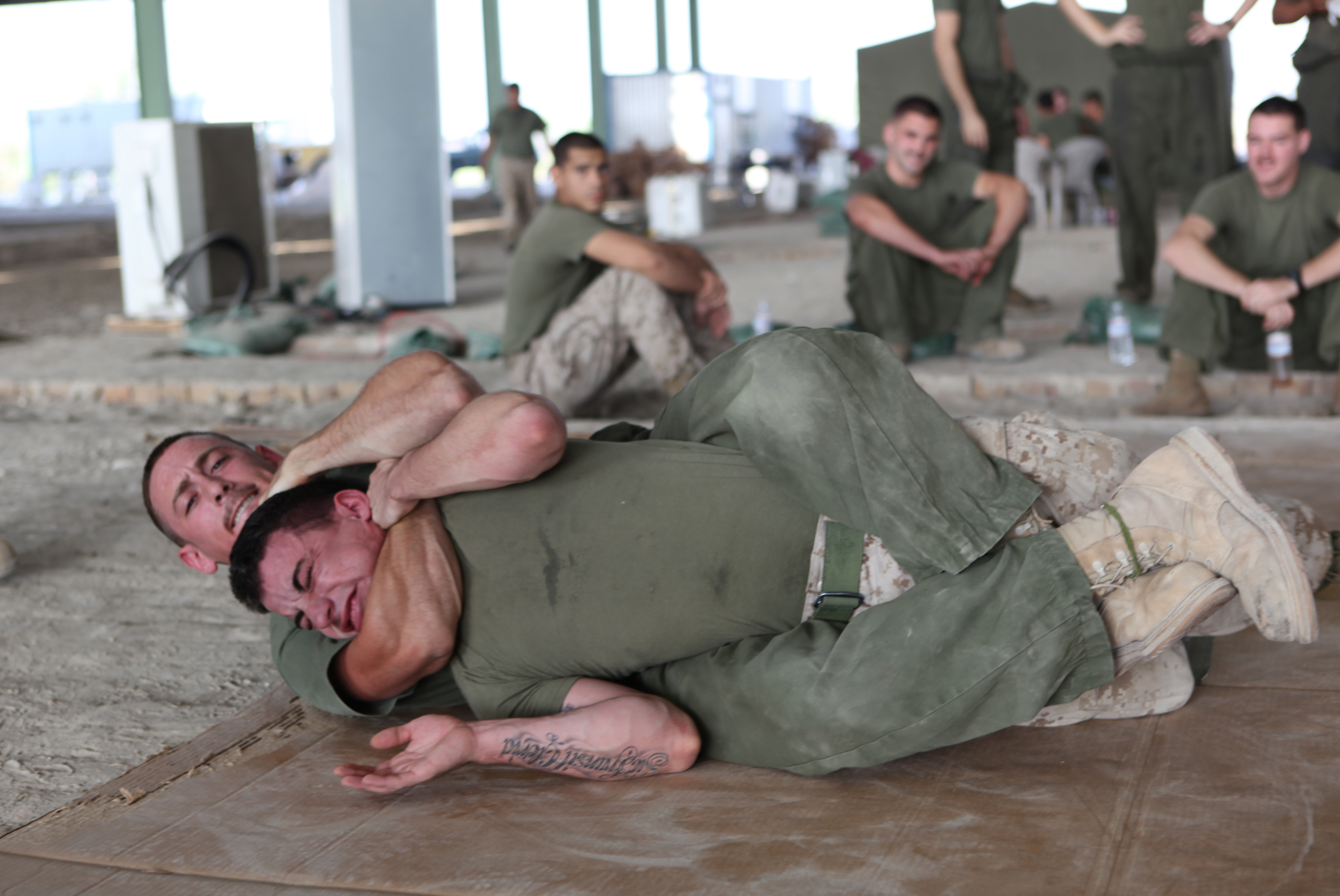
Rear naked choke hold during Marine Corps Martial Arts Program training session

The placement of the legs usually falls into two categories. The first is a body lock. The attacker places one of their legs across the stomach or lower chest of the victim. They then place their other leg over their shin, creating a figure-four with their legs. This allows them to limit movement and stay close to the back of their victim, also possibly immobilising the victim's arms via the attacker's legs if flexible/long enough. This technique was used by Anderson Silva against Dan Henderson and by Jim Miller against Melvin Guillard. The other common technique is known as using "hooks". In this version, the attacker places their legs inside the victim's legs. They then move their legs out, placing their shin behind the victim's knees, essentially using their shins and feet as hooks to control the victim's legs. This variation leaves the attacker open to the possibility of leglocks from their opponent, as they are attacking the choke. When standing, the legs can either pull the opponent down or trip them, transitioning to kneeling/sitting or lying down, or strike the opponent.

== "Clasping hands" variation ==
This variation (also known as Palm to Palm) has the supporting hand clasp the hand of the choking arm, allowing more pressure to be applied to the neck, but losing some of the control of the head. This alters the choke somewhat so that it is more likely to be applied as an airway-restricting choke or mixed blood and air choke, which results in more pain but a slower choke-out. As such, this technique is less frequently used at advanced levels in Judo. Nonetheless, it has seen some successful applications in mixed martial arts competition: for instance, it was used by Fedor Emelianenko, a heavyweight champion in PRIDE, to defeat Kazuyuki Fujita at the PRIDE 26 event in 2003. Fujita tapped out about five seconds after the choke was applied. He used it again to defeat former UFC Heavyweight Champion Tim Sylvia in 36 seconds. Sylvia tapped out immediately once the choke was sunk in, and after the fight described it as being very painful. It was also used by Ultimate Fighting Championship fighter Matt Hughes to defeat Frank Trigg in their second fight, which was adapted from a hand-on-biceps version of the rear naked choke. Anderson Silva also used the clasping hands variation when he defeated Dan Henderson in the UFC. Joe Lauzon used this choke in his fight against Melvin Guillard, initially using the standard version, then switching to a palm-to-palm.

=== Judo ===
In Judo, the rear naked choke is known as Hadaka-jime (裸絞め): "naked choke", one of the 36 constriction techniques of Kodokan Judo in the Shime-waza list.

==== Technique ====
The key feature that sets Hadaka-Jime apart from other Judo chokes is that it doesn't rely on the opponent's clothing, namely their gi lapel, to create the choking tourniquet. It digs the blade of the wrist into the carotid sinus , similar to the hand clasp method and uses a lever motion, helped by the underhand. It is faster to apply, requiring less strength than the figure four/mixed-martial arts version, but it is more difficult to learn. It is not an air choke but a carotid choke created entirely by the attacker's arms.

=== Similar non-judo techniques ===
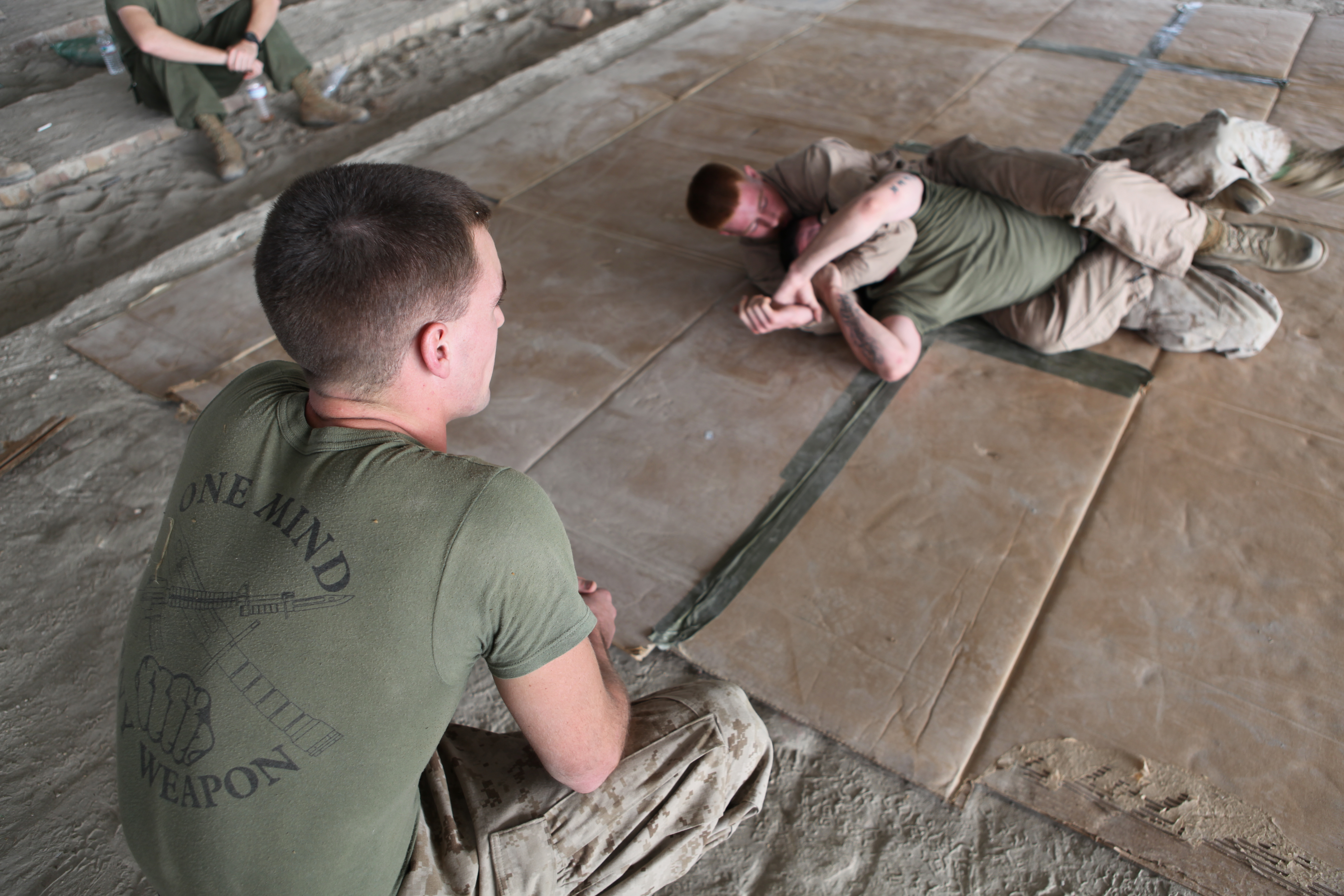
Grabbing the opponent's free hand is a way to prevent him from fully locking the choke.

Hadaka Jime is also recognized as Hadaka-Jime-San in Danzan Ryu jujitsu's twenty-five techniques in the Shimete list. Danzan Ryu also recognizes the Guillotine choke as Hadaka-Jime-Ichi. But the principle is the same as Jiu-Jitsu's ground version.

=== Included systems ===
Systems:

- Kodokan Judo, Judo Lists
- Danzan Ryu jujitsu, Danza Ryu Lists

Lists:

- The Canon Of Judo
- Judo technique

=== Hasami-jime ===
Kyuzo Mifune demonstrates Hasami-Jime in The Essence of Judo and is described in The Canon of Judo.*

=== Others ===
Danzan Ryu enumerates three versions of Hadaka-Jime:

1. Ichi (one)
Standing neck-break. Two versions:
1. Neck twist
2. Guillotine

A version of the guillotine, Mae-Hadaka-Jime, is also described in The Canon Of Judo, an authoritative work that covers the history of judo and its predecessor, jujutsu.

2. Ni (two)
Choke with the forearm. This is an air choke with the forearm pressing on the throat.
3. San (three)
Figure-4 choke with the forearm. This is a blood choke with the forearms and biceps pressing and the sides of the neck.

== "Sleeper hold" in professional wrestling ==
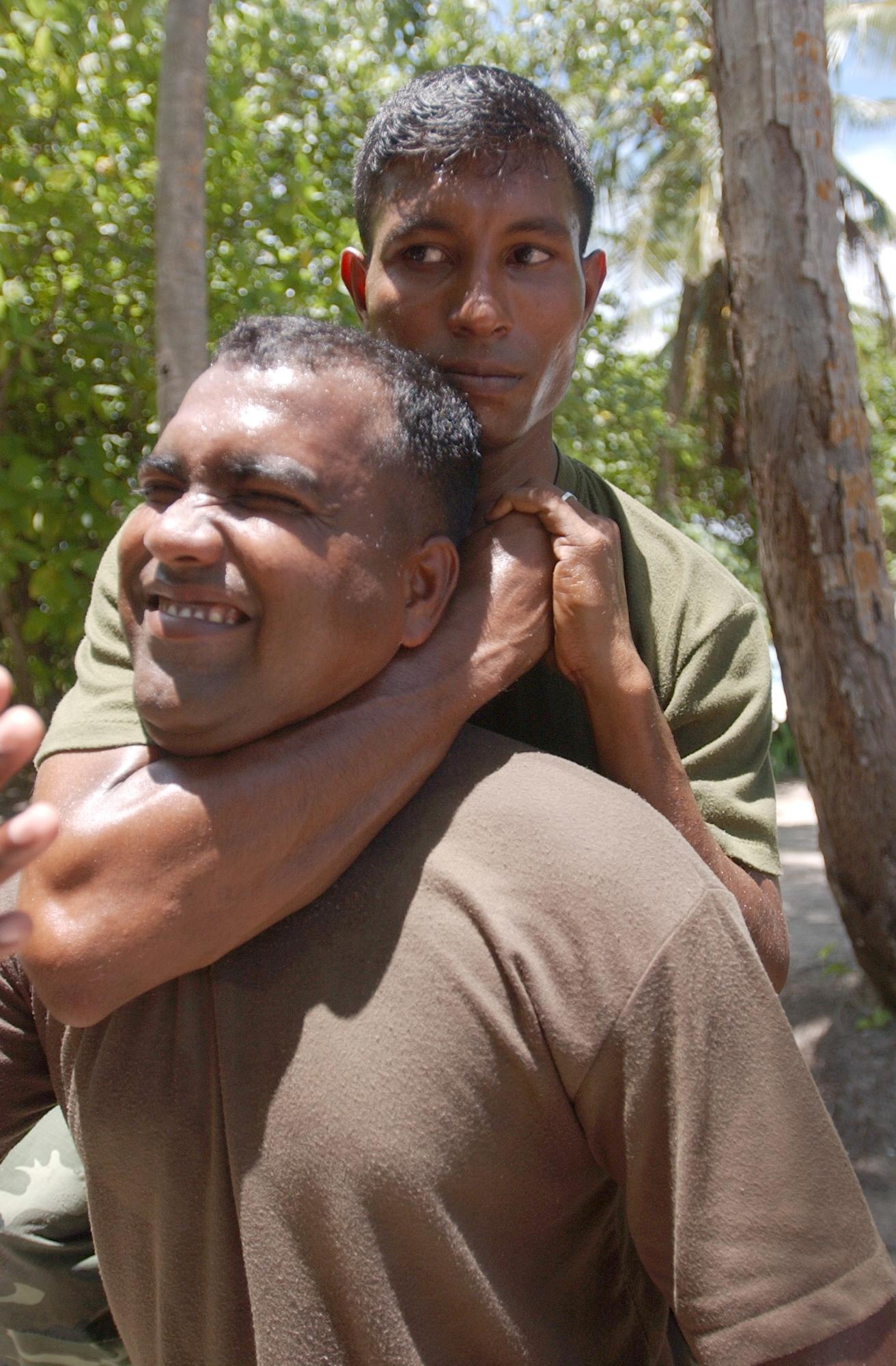
A "sleeper hold" variant of the rear naked choke

The Sleeper Hold was originated in professional wrestling by Evan Lewis in the 1880s when pro wrestling was still a legitimate contest. Lewis earned the nickname "Strangler" for his use of the hold and was an accomplished catch wrestler using the hold, defeating Ernst Roeber for the world championship before eventually losing the title to Martin Burns. In the southeastern United States, this move was also known as the Charleston Choke.

Modern pro wrestling's first "sleeper hold", technically different from a choke, which is a compression of the throat and/or Adam's apple, is thought to have been performed by Jim Londos on 29 June 1931. Suspicion abounded as to the nature of Londos' move (which had looked suspiciously like a choke against the windpipe); however, Londos was quoted the next day in The New York Sun as simply having performed "a new hold I perfected which shuts off the jugular vein."

Though Londos' original move may or may not have been inspired by judo's "hadaka jime", pro-wrestling's sleeper and a rear naked choke both share a similar style of execution. However, for the sleeper to be used in the modern performance art-related world of pro-wrestling, the leverage arm is positioned in a relaxed state so the hold is not fully applied.

It is more realistically used by All Elite Wrestling wrestler Samoa Joe (whose wrestling move-set is closer to mixed martial arts). The move has become more of a staple among independent wrestlers, as well as the Japanese wrestlers with the "strong style" of the sport; the most notable being former MMA star Minoru Suzuki.

=== Catch wrestling's sleeper ===
In modern catch wrestling circles, the term sleeper hold refers to a variation of the rear naked choke in which the individual performing the hold snakes the leverage arm across the opponent's throat (in the same manner as the traditional rear naked choke) and grasps their opposite shoulder, rather than the biceps. The opposite hand is also placed against the base of the opponent's skull in the form of a closed Hammer Fist, or on top of the head. The attacking wrestler then squeezes their elbows together, pushes forward with the hammer fist (if used), and crunches forward with the abdominal muscles, producing an extremely tight and fast-acting choke.

== Safety ==
This choke, in either the figure-four or clasped-hand variation, is an extremely dangerous technique if used thoughtlessly or improperly. When applied as a blood choke in particular, it immediately reduces the supply of oxygen to the brain, leading to unconsciousness and ultimately (if not released) to brain damage or death. While no fatalities have been reported as due to choking in judo, there is evidence to suggest that repeated application of any stranglehold can predispose one to Internal Carotid Artery Dissection, with the rear-naked choke technique being directly implicated in one such incident.

== Additional information ==
The rear-naked choke, with the proper setup, is considered very difficult to escape. Some common defenses include tucking the chin to prevent the choking arm from applying pressure to the neck. However, the person applying the choke can either use their other hand to pull the defender's head backwards, revealing the neck and lock in the choke, or they can apply the choke directly to the chin, which is considered a crank and is painful and will likely force the defender to tap. As with all choke defenses, the first step is to always fight the choking arm, which will maximize the defender's chance of escaping.

According to a scientific study, the rear-naked choke is the 6th fastest choke to render an opponent unconscious.

1. Bulldog choke - 6.2
2. Arm triangle - 7.2
3. D'Arce choke - 8.6
4. Schultz Headlock - 8.8 seconds
5. Guillotine - 8.9 seconds
6. Rear naked choke - 8.9 seconds

== See also ==
- Back mount
- Chokehold
- Fainting
- Submission (combat sport)
