= Criss Angel Mindfreak =

- Promotional poster for Season 6
- Created by: Criss Angel
- Directed by: Criss Angel
- Starring: Criss Angel
- Opening theme: "Mindfreak" by Criss Angel
- Country of origin: United States
- No. of seasons: 6
- No. of episodes: 96 (list of episodes)

Production
- Producers: Will Raee; Erich Recker
- Running time: 29 minutes

Original release
- Network: A&E (U.S.); Discovery Channel (Canada)
- Release: July 20, 2005 – September 8, 2010

Criss Angel Mindfreak is an American reality television series that aired on A&E in the U.S. and Discovery Channel in Canada from July 20, 2005, to September 8, 2010. It centers on stunts and street magic acts by magician Criss Angel.

== Releases ==
DVD/CD title	Release date	Additional information
Criss Angel: Mindfreak – The Complete Season One	November 29, 2005	
Criss Angel: Mindfreak – Halloween Special	August 1, 2006	
Criss Angel: Mindfreak – The Official Soundtrack	September 5, 2006	Audio CD which also includes a bonus DVD with behind-the-scenes featurettes on the making of the soundtrack music and the making of Season 2.
Criss Angel: Mindfreak – The Complete Season Two	November 21, 2006	
Criss Angel: Mindfreak – Giftset	December 12, 2006	Includes The Complete Season One, The Complete Season Two, and the Halloween Special in a special box with lenticular "vanishing Criss Angel" art.
Criss Angel: Mindfreak – The Complete Season Three	January 15, 2008	
Criss Angel: Mindfreak – The Best of Seasons One and Two	June 24, 2008	Includes 8 "top-rated" episodes from Seasons One-Two.
Criss Angel: Mindfreak – The Complete Season Four	January 20, 2009	
Criss Angel: Mindfreak – The Most Dangerous Escapes	September 29, 2009	Includes 7 "handpicked" episodes from Seasons One-Four.
The Five Lives of Criss Angel: Mindfreak (The Complete Season Five)	December 15, 2009	
Criss Angel: Mindfreak – Collector's Edition Megaset	December 15, 2009	15-DVD set in a collector's box (with pop-up buzzsaw inner art) containing The Complete Seasons One-Five, the Halloween Special, and an exclusive bonus disc featuring six previously unreleased episodes from Season Three.
Criss Angel: Mindfreak – The Complete Season Six	January 11, 2011	

== See also ==
- List of Criss Angel Mindfreak episodes
- Criss Angel BeLIEve
- List of television shows set in Las Vegas
