= Crab Defense (boxing style) =

Fighting style

Crab Defense, also known as the Crab Shell or Crab Style, is a style of fighting primarily used in boxing. Variations of this style include the Cross-armed Guard and Reverse Cross-armed Guard, as well as the Philly Shell or Michigan Defense. Crab style fighters Floyd Mayweather Jr., Pernell Whitaker, James Toney, Sugar Ray Robinson, Bernard Hopkins and Nicolino Locche are widely considered some of the greatest defensive boxers of all time. Crab style is considered one of the oldest styles in modern boxing, but variations of this defense are used in several martial arts.

== Stance ==
Crab style relies primarily on a bladed, or side, stance. The fighter gives the appearance of using a sideways motion towards the opponent which resembles the sideways movement of a crab. When the crab style is used in certain martial arts, however, such as Muay Thai or Mixed Martial Arts, the fighter often adopts more of a squared stance to defend against leg kicks.

== Guard ==
Variations of crab style use different guards including:

=== Cross-armed guard ===
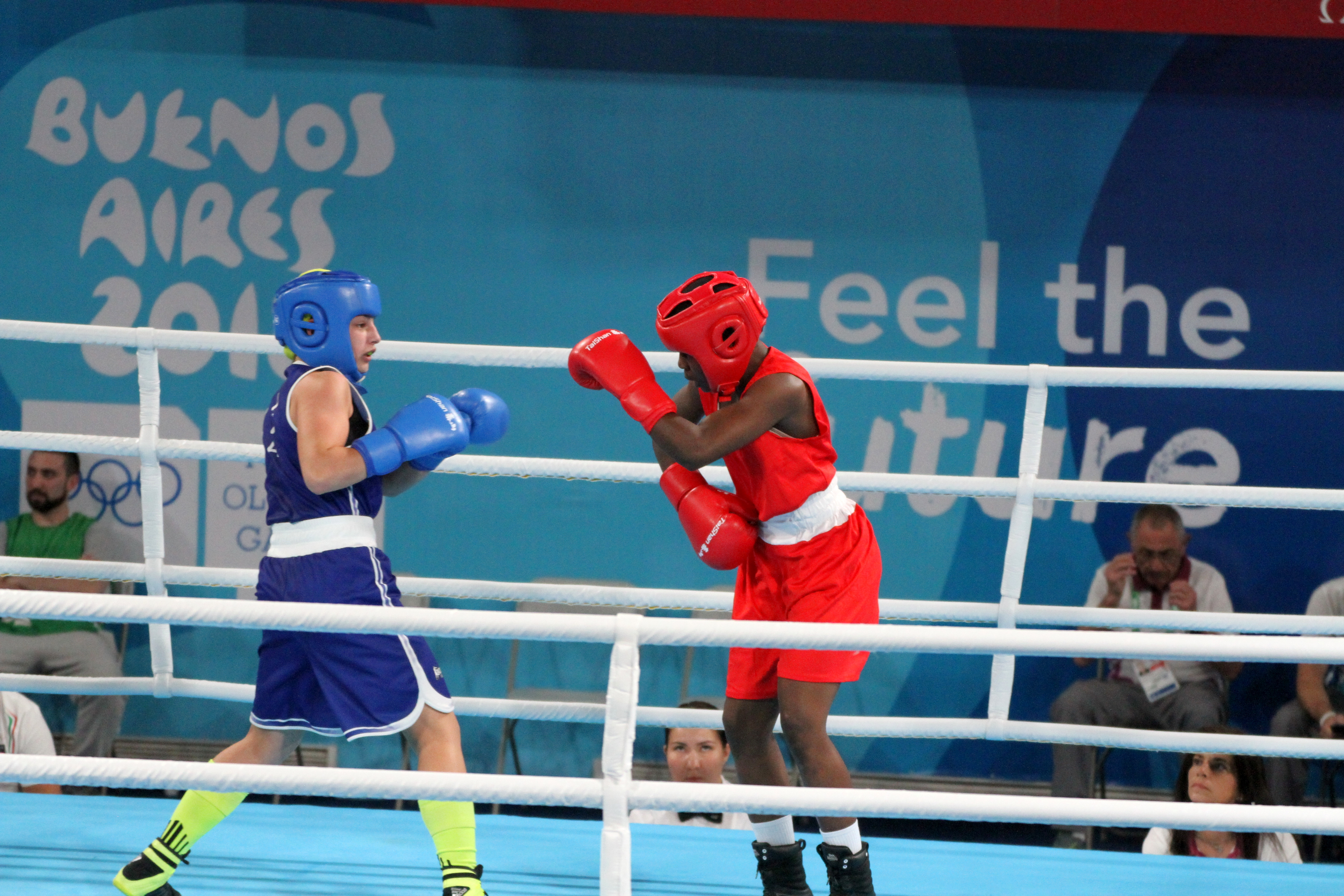
Boxer (right) using Cross-armed guard from a square stance with the rear arm protecting the head and lead arm protecting the body

This guard can be performed from a square or bladed stance with both arms used to protect the head, the rear arm used to protect the head and the lead arm used to protect the body, or both arms used to protect the body. From a square stance this guard uses the rear arm (right for an orthodox fighter and left for a southpaw) in a cross block position with the rear glove near the lead shoulder with palm towards the opponent. The position of the lead arm (left for an orthodox fighter and right for a southpaw) is greatly varied. The lead arm can be placed under the rear arm horizontally or diagonally in front of the face. This is used for reducing head damage often at close range. The only head punch that a fighter is susceptible to is a punch to the top of the head. The body is open if the guard is kept high, but fighters who do this bend and lean to protect the body. The lead arm can also lie low, across the abdomen, protecting the body. In the clinch, fighters will occasionally use both arms across the body.

The forearms and elbows can be used to block, or the palm of the gloves can be used to punch catch or parry punches The head is titled towards the rear shoulder to keep the head off of centerline, and to make space to use the shoulder to block. The lead shoulder is brought in tight against the side of the face.

This guard is versatile and can be used while moving or leaning forward, often from a crouched position with a front foot heavy squared stance. Meaning that the now protected head of the boxer, is a closer target than the body.

Boxer (left) using Cross-armed guard from a bladed stance with the rear arm protecting the head and lead arm protecting the body

This guard is also effective in a bladed stance with the rear hand placed in a cross block position, with the rear hand over the lead shoulder to protect against straight punches, or in a punch catch position. This is often used while moving or leaning backwards to block an opponent's counter punches after a missed punch, to shoulder roll, or to set up counter punches. When using the bladed stance the lead arm can be used to wedge block or reverse elbow block, while the lead arm can be used to punch catch. The Philly Shell or Michigan Defense is a variation of the bladed version of the cross-armed guard.

=== Reverse cross-armed guard ===
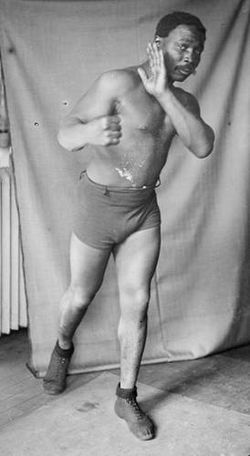
Boxer demonstrating a rear hook from a Reverse cross-armed guard

The forearms can be placed on top of each other horizontally or diagonally in front of the face with the lead arm (left for an orthodox fighter and right for a southpaw) being on the top of the rear arm with lead glove over the rear shoulder in a cross block position. The position of the rear arm (right for an orthodox fighter and left for a southpaw) is greatly varied when it rises vertically from being low to cover the body or high to help protect the head. Boxers sometimes switch from a cross-armed guard to a reverse cross-armed guard, often while slipping and rolling. The reverse cross-arm guard was used extensively by boxer Gene Fullmer, and used often by sport karate fighter Linda Denley when fighting from an orthodox stance.

=== Philly shell or Michigan Defense ===
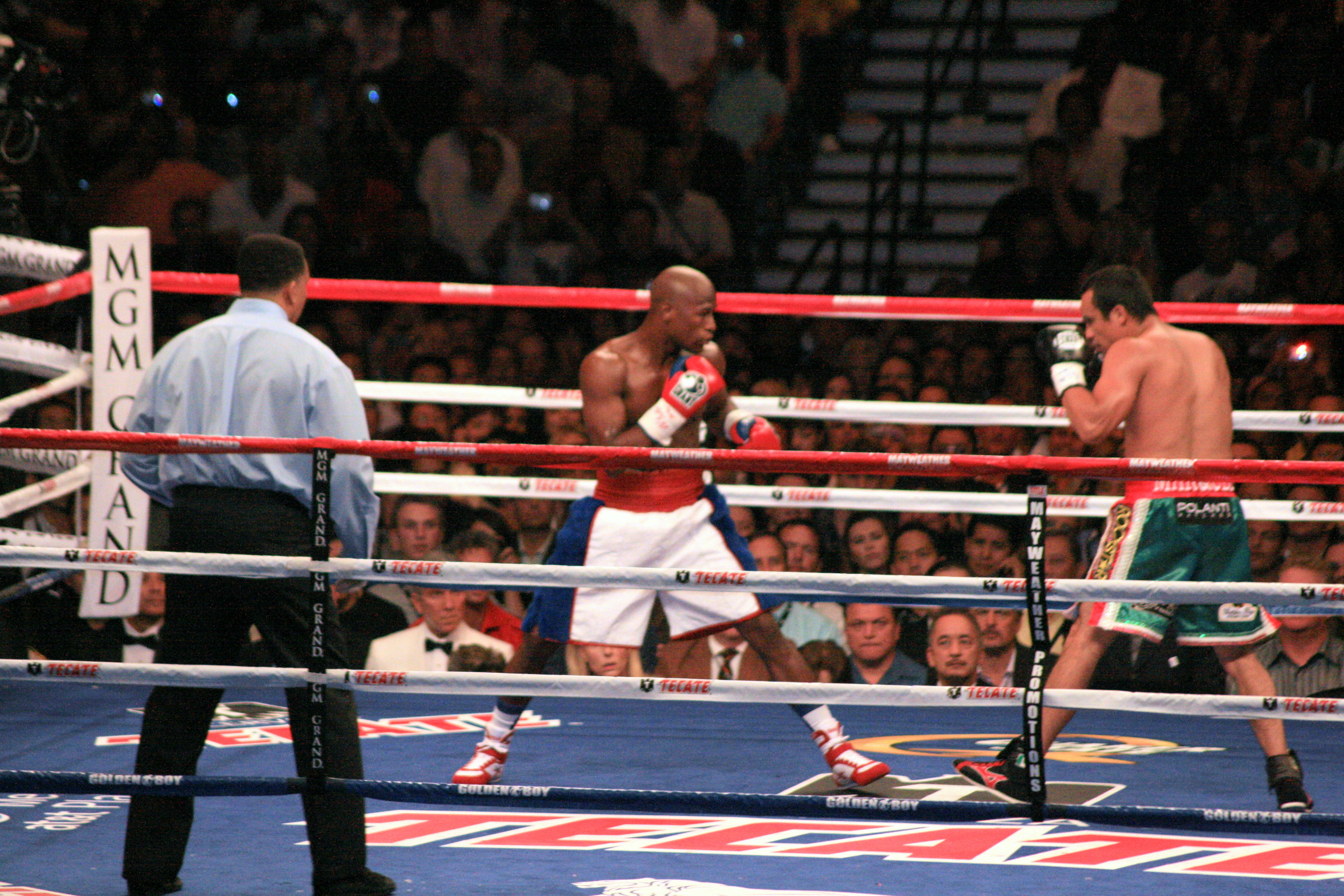
Floyd Mayweather Jr. (left) using Michigan Defense against Juan Manuel Márquez

The lead arm is placed across the abdomen, below the rear arm, to protect the body. The head is titled towards the rear shoulder to keep the head off the centerline, and to make space to use the shoulder to block. The lead shoulder is brought in tight against the side of the face with the chin tucked. The rear hand can be placed next to the chin close to the rear shoulder, in hook cover position, to defend against hook punches, placed in a cross block position, with the rear hand over the lead shoulder to protect against straight punches, or on the centerline to be able to rotate between a hook cover, a cross block and a punch catch.

The term Philly Shell refers to Philadelphia fighters who use this guard such as George Benton, Bernard Hopkins and Tim Witherspoon. Whereas the term Michigan Defense refers to Michigan fighters known for this defense such as Floyd Mayweather Sr., Roger Mayweather and James Toney.

Advantages - Most boxers use this defense with the rear hand on centerline with the thumb pointed towards the boxer at chin to sternum level. This allows the boxer to rotate between a hook cover and a cross guard or punch catch. The advantages of this guard are that it provides passive defense against straight punches and uppercuts to the head and body. The high lead shoulder also protects the chin against straight punches and hooks towards the boxer's lead side. This guard also provides two lines of defense with the lead arm used to wedge block or elbow block and the rear hand to punch catch, cross block, leverage block or hook cover. This defense also provides a more universal defense than most other defenses. For example, a wedge block can defend against both a jab and a cross, compared to the classic guards which often require highly specific responses to these same punches. The low lead hand makes it difficult for an opponent to see and defend against the jab and lead hook.

Disadvantages - The disadvantages of this style are that the rear side does not have a passive defense against hooks, but with the head tilted towards the rear shoulder creating distance and the head off of centerline this gives the boxer time to employ an active defense against hooks. While the lead side uses the high shoulder to block hooks this covers the chin and jaw, but does not provide passive defense against punches to the temple. Opponents may attempt to exploit these disadvantages.

Fake jab, lead hook - when boxers are in a closed stance the opponent may fake a jab, baiting the boxer to reach for the jab in a punch catch position with their rear hand, then throw a powerful lead hook before the boxer can move to a hook cover position. This is, however, often ineffective as the boxer can instead use a wedge block or elbow block to block the jab, leaving their rear arm free to hook cover.

Jab to body, overhand to head - another example is an opponent using a jab to the body then a rear overhand to the head. In this case the boxer's arm across the abdomen acts as a forearm block against the lead jab. This, however, pins the boxer's arm against their body and prevents the boxer from being able to use a wedge block, elbow block or shoulder roll against the rear overhand. The boxer, however, has numerous counters to this. The boxer can move or lean back after blocking the jab to the body causing their opponent's rear overhand to miss. The boxer can throw the straight cross immediately after blocking the body jab on the forearm causing their opponent to abandon the overhand and use their rear hand to defend that straight cross. The boxer could also elbow block the jab to the body, instead of taking it on the forearm, this keeps the arm from being pinned and would put the boxer in a position to shoulder roll their opponent's rear overhand. All of these counters were used by Floyd Mayweather Jr. in his win against Shane Mosley who tried this several times in their bout, but lost by unanimous decision.

Counter jab with rear overhand - in another example from the closed stance, opponents may wait for the boxer to jab, then try to throw a rear overhand as a counter to the jab. As the boxer has their lead shoulder up to jab they cannot use that to shoulder roll the rear overhand to the head. This, however, can be countered by using a cross block while jabbing to defend the rear overhand.

== Defense ==
The crab style uses traditional boxing defense such as slipping and the bob and weave. It also uses defensive techniques largely unique to this style in boxing, but which are found in other martial arts.

=== Cross block ===
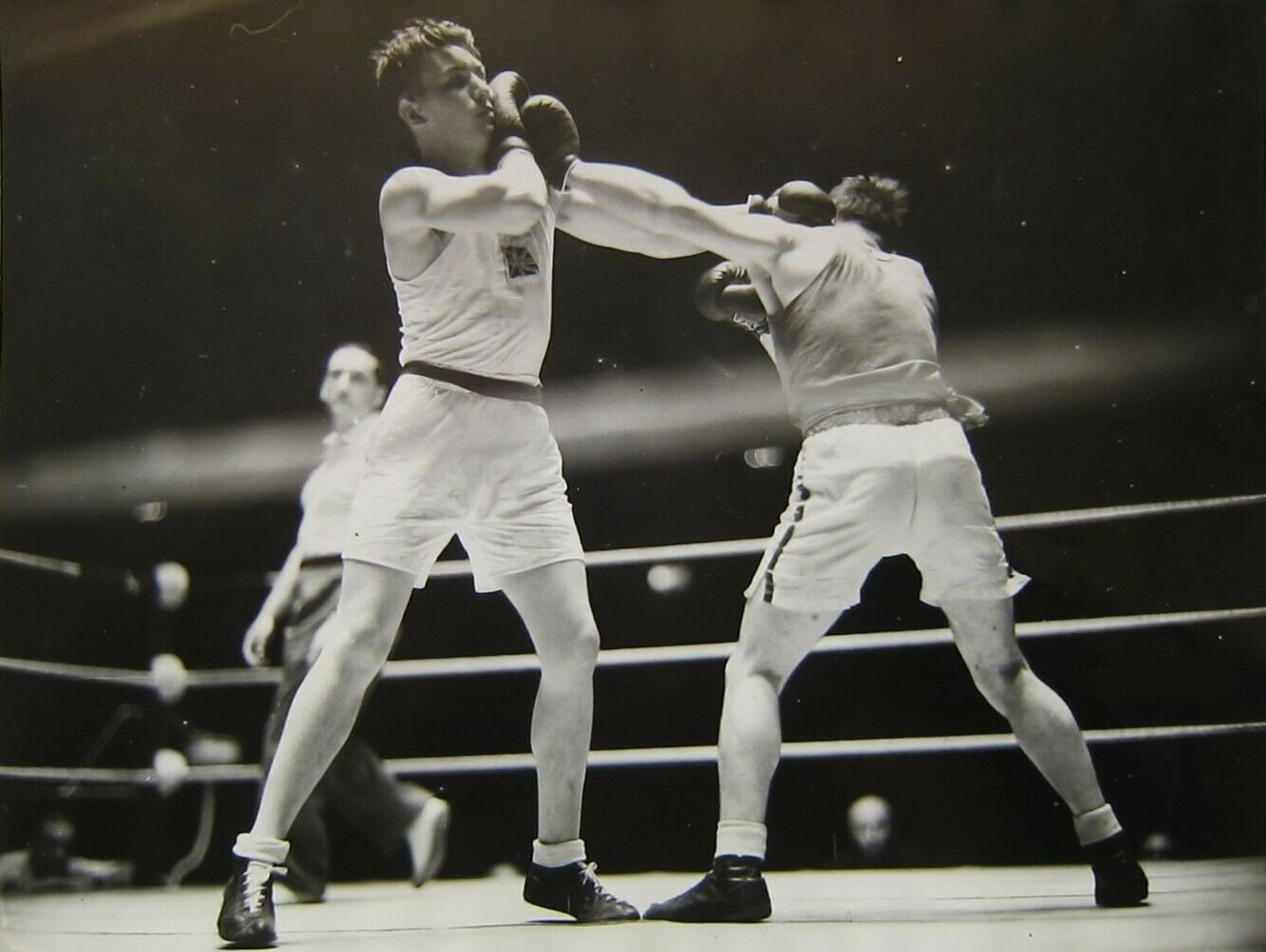
Boxer (left) using rear cross block with palm facing opponent

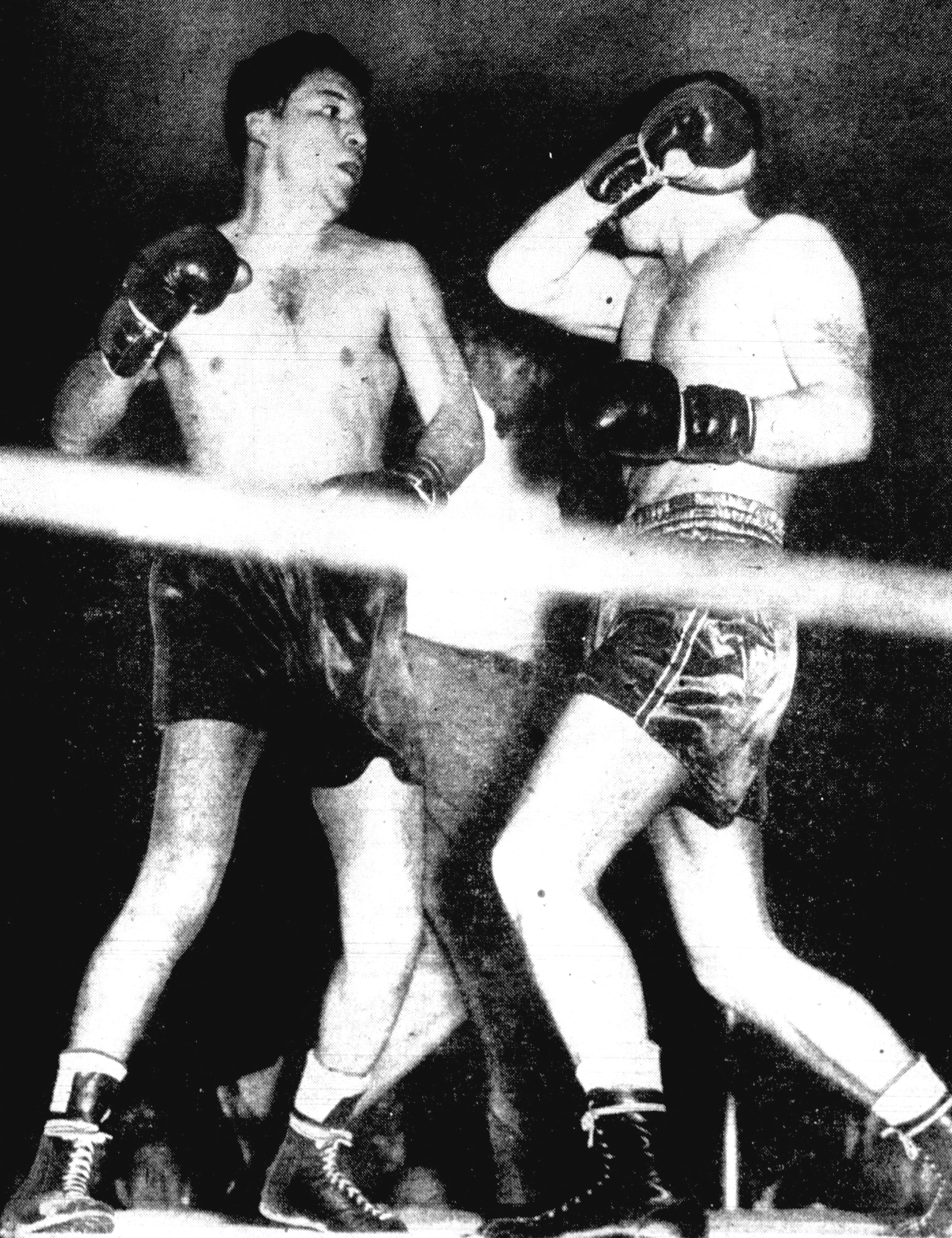
Boxer (right) using rear cross block with hypothenar eminence facing opponent

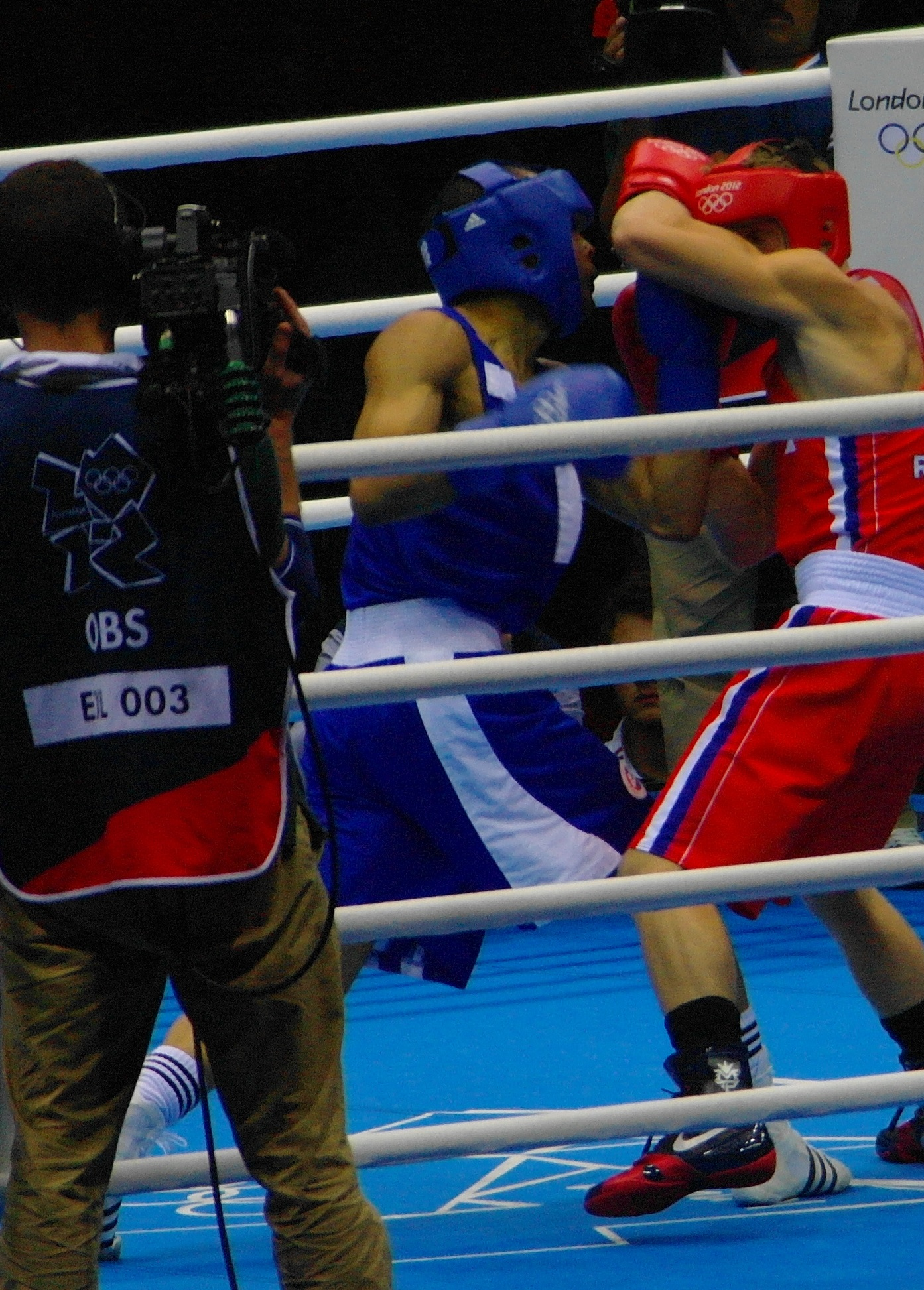
Boxer (right) using lead cross block

The cross block is often done with the rear arm (right for an orthodox fighter and left for a southpaw) but can also be done with the lead arm (left for an orthodox fighter and right for a southpaw). In a cross block position with the rear hand, the glove is over the lead shoulder with either the full palm, or the hypothenar eminence, facing towards the opponent. Using the lead hand the glove is over the rear shoulder with either the full palm, or the hypothenar eminence, facing towards the opponent. With the cross block the glove is usually used to block straight punches, but the forearm can also be used. The forearm and elbow can be used to block uppercuts, and the glove and elbow can also be used to block hooks.

=== Wedge block ===
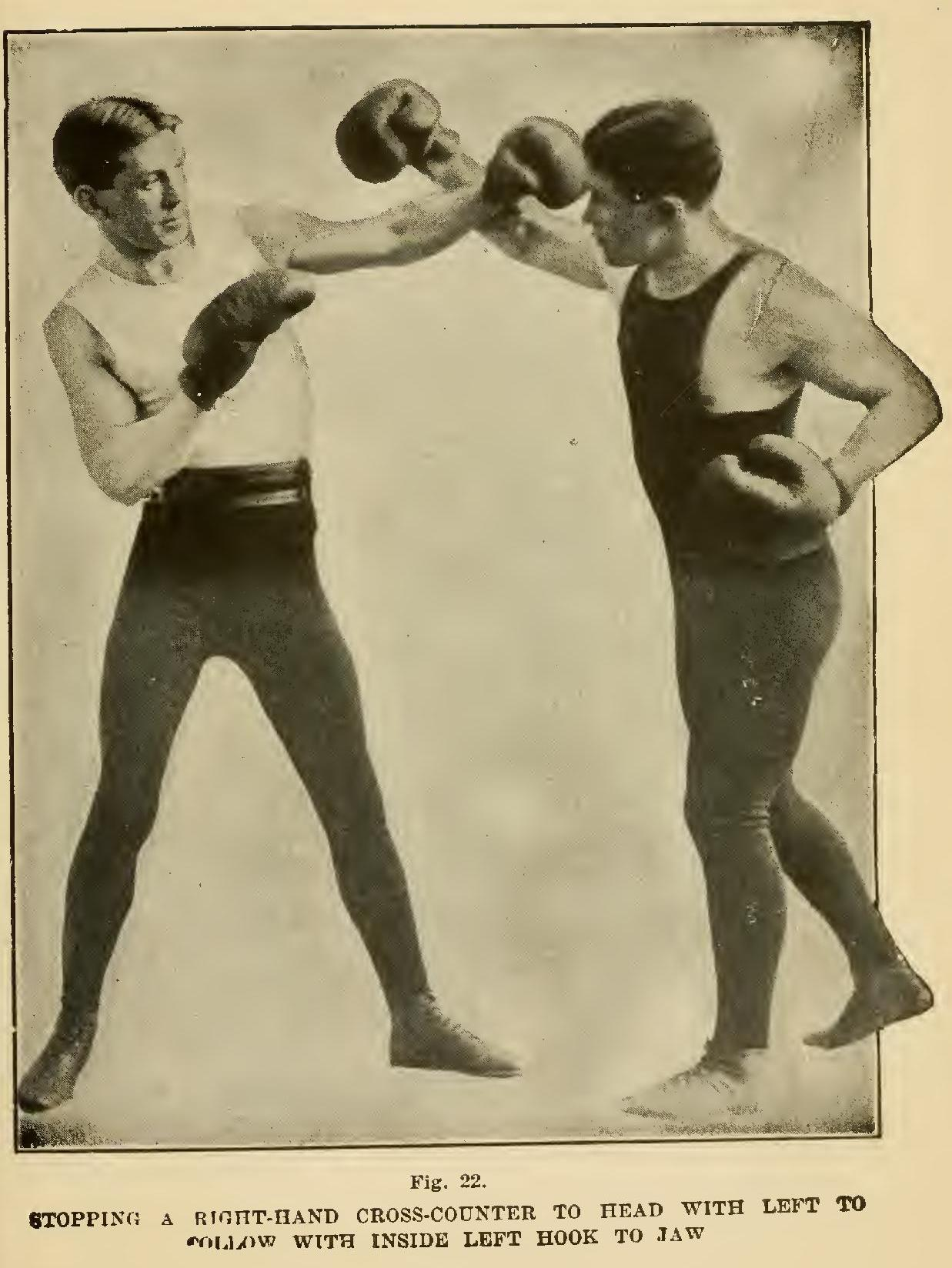
Boxer (left) using a wedge block

The wedge block is also known as the horizontal forearm block or leverage block. In Karate this block is called Age-uke, and in Taekwondo it is called Ulgul Makgi or Olgul Makki. This block is used primarily with the lead arm to defend against straight punches, and overhands by moving the arm upwards towards the incoming punch. It can be used against hooks by moving the arm up and outwards towards the incoming hook, or outwards to jam uppercuts in boxing. It is also used against kicks in martial arts.

=== Shoulder roll ===
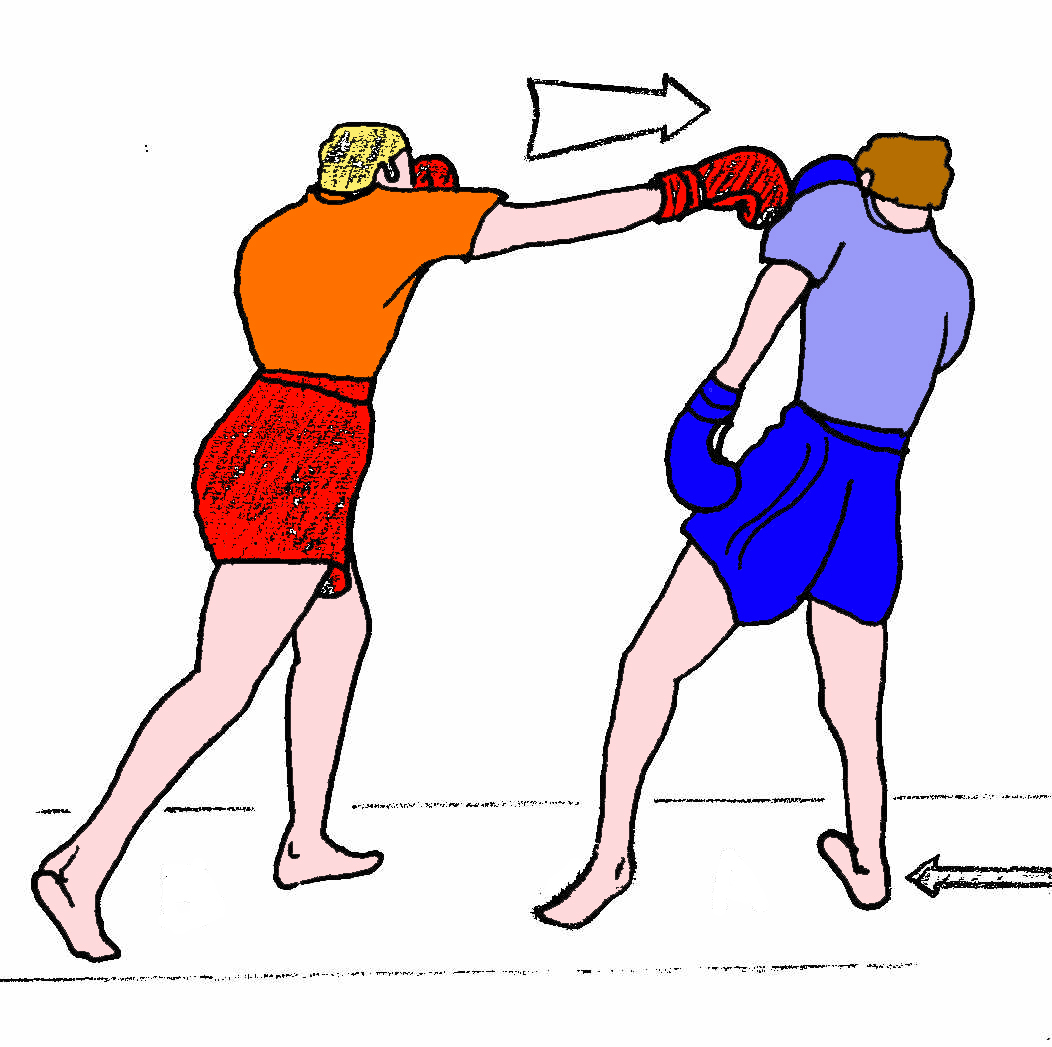
Boxer (right) using shoulder roll

Crab style fighters often make use of the shoulder block and shoulder roll.

Shoulder block — a defensive technique where a fighter uses their shoulder to deflect or block punches, usually the opponent's straight punches like a right cross or a southpaw jab. The fighter positions their lead shoulder high, tucking their chin behind it. The shoulder is rolled forward to meet the incoming punch, deflecting it away from the head and body.

Shoulder roll — to execute the lead shoulder roll a fighter rotates and ducks (to the right for orthodox fighters and to the left for southpaws) when their opponents punch is coming towards them and then rotates back towards their opponent while their opponent is bringing their hand back. The fighter will throw a punch with their back hand as they are rotating towards their undefended opponent. The rear shoulder roll can also be used where the fighter rotates and ducks (to the left for orthodox fighters and to the right for southpaws) when their opponents punch is coming towards them and then rotates back towards their opponent while their opponent is bringing their hand back.

=== Elbow blocks ===
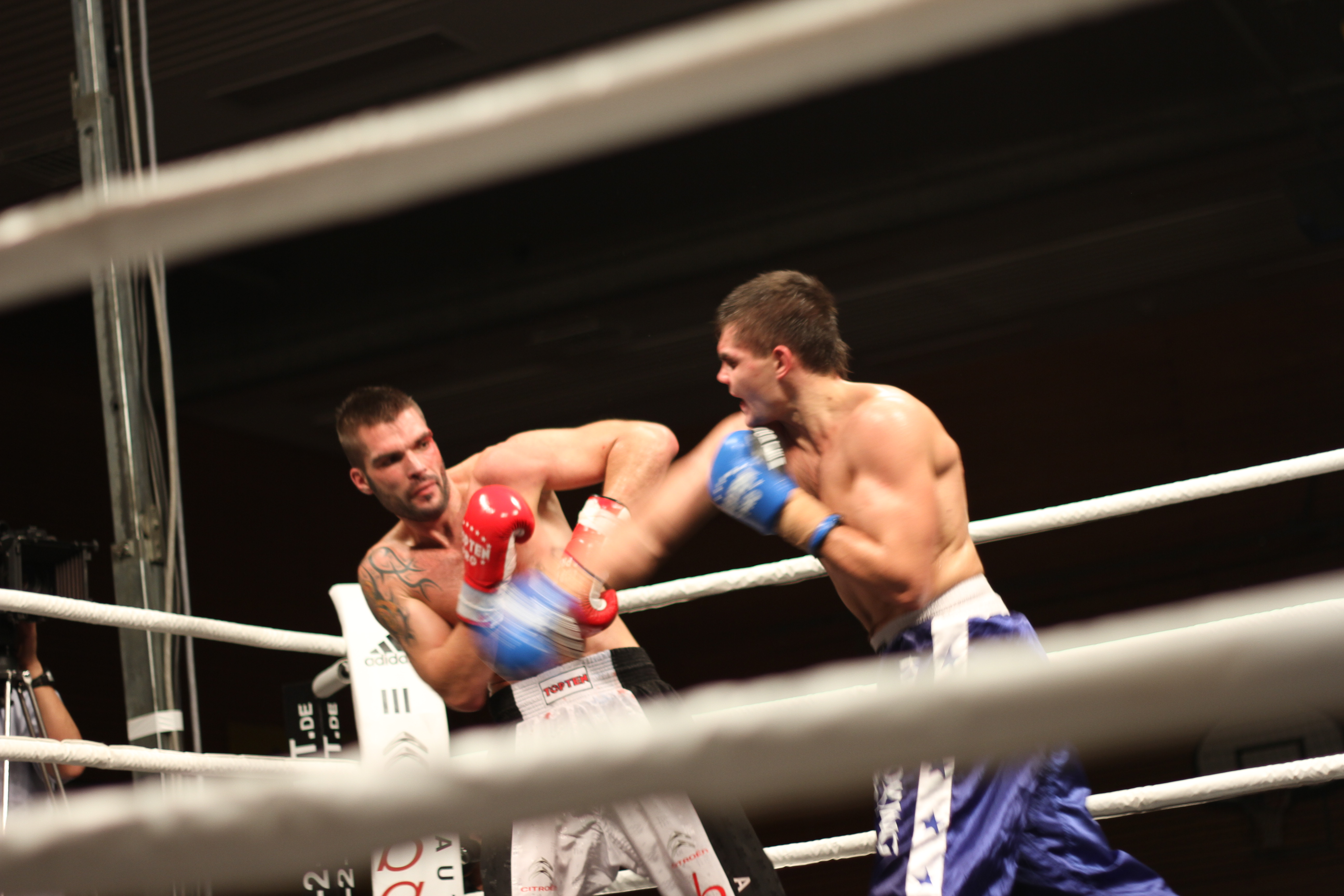
Fighter (left) using elbow block

While boxers who use the conventional guard, high guard, or Peek-a-boo style use their elbows to block their bodies, crab style fighters are unique as they also use the reverse elbows to block their heads. The reverse elbow block can be used from a shoulder roll position. The reverse elbow block also functions as an intermediating position between a wedge block and a shoulder roll, allowing a boxer to move from a reverse elbow block to a wedge block or shoulder roll.

=== Hook cover ===
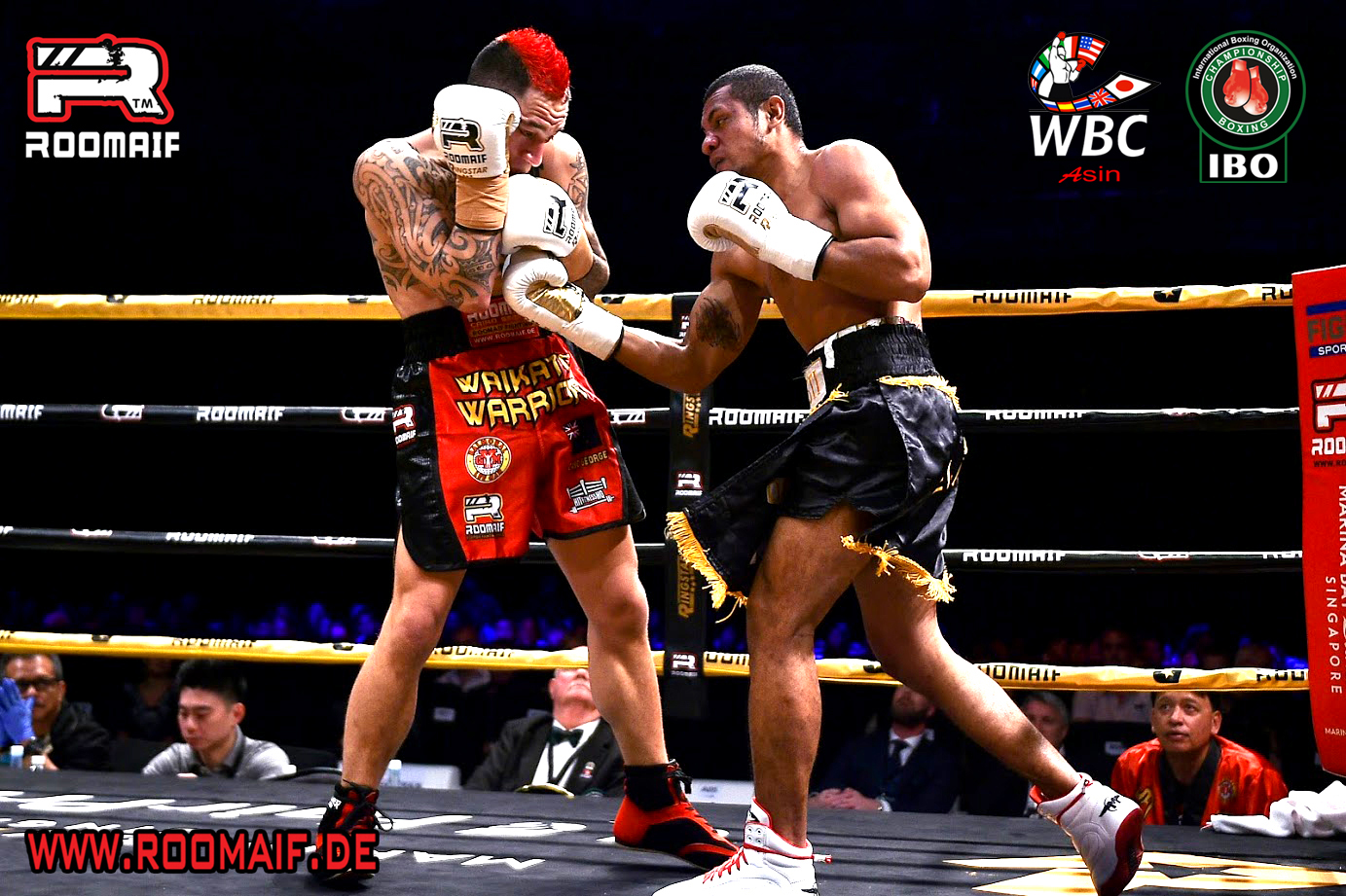
Fighter (left) with rear arm in hook cover position

A hook cover is a defense against a hook punch where a boxer raises their hand up, bending the elbow as if answering a phone creating a position where the glove covers the head against the hook. The chin is also tucked while covering. The boxer may also slightly lean the upper body away from the incoming hook, coordinating this lean with a small step or shift in their weight to maintain balance and create space for a counter. While hook covers are a common defense in boxing, crab style fighters are unique as they primarily only use a hook cover to defend against hooks to their rear side. From a closed stance a crab style fighter must turn their waist towards the incoming hook while using a hook cover to be able to shoulder block, shoulder roll or elbow block a follow-up cross. If the boxer does not turn their waist the hook will pin the boxer's glove to their head making them unable to turn their waist to shoulder block, shoulder roll or reverse elbow block a follow up cross, with the low lead this will leave them open to being hit by the cross. While a hook cover is common among crab style boxers, it is less common among crab style fighters in other martial arts as it is less effective against kicks.

=== Punch catch ===
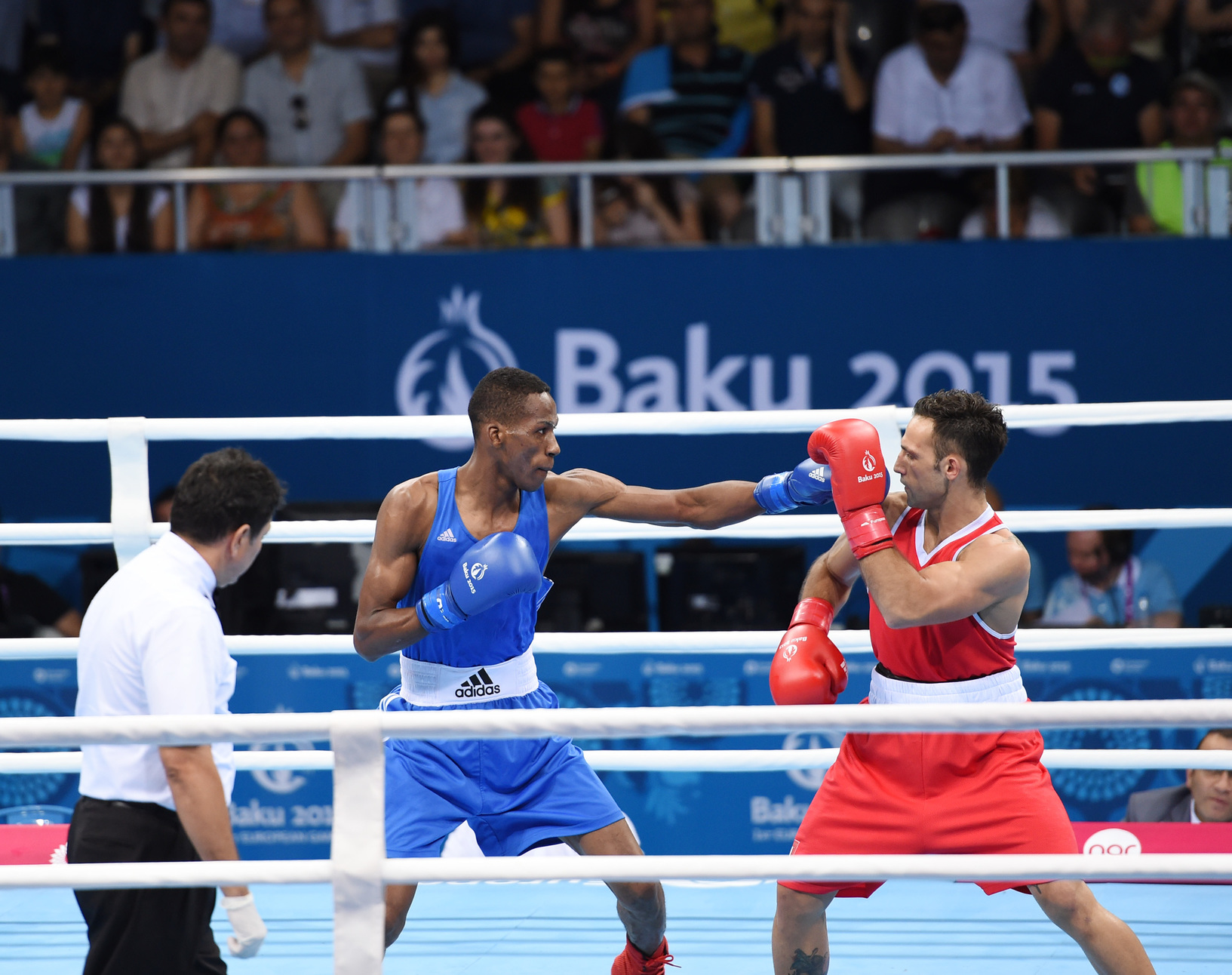
Boxer (right) using a punch catch

A punch catch is a defensive technique where a fighter uses their open palm to intercept an incoming punch, aiming to slow the momentum of the strike and stopping it from hitting its intended target. Catching is often used for straight punches like the jab. While a punch catch is a common defense in boxing, Philly shell or Michigan defense fighters are unique as they primarily only use a punch catch with their rear hand.

== History ==
The origin of the crab style is unknown; however, it is considered one of the oldest styles in modern boxing. The crab defense even predates the Marquess of Queensberry Rules since elements of the crab defense are found in boxing manuals from the bare-knuckle boxing era.

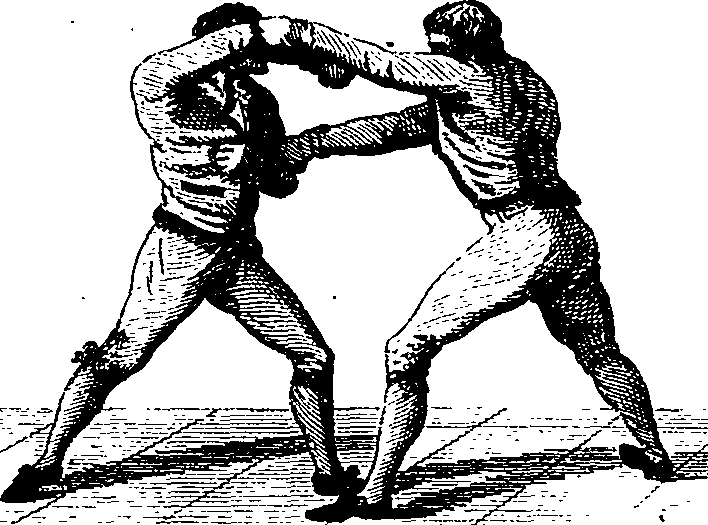
Boxer (left) using cross-arm guard in 1789 manual

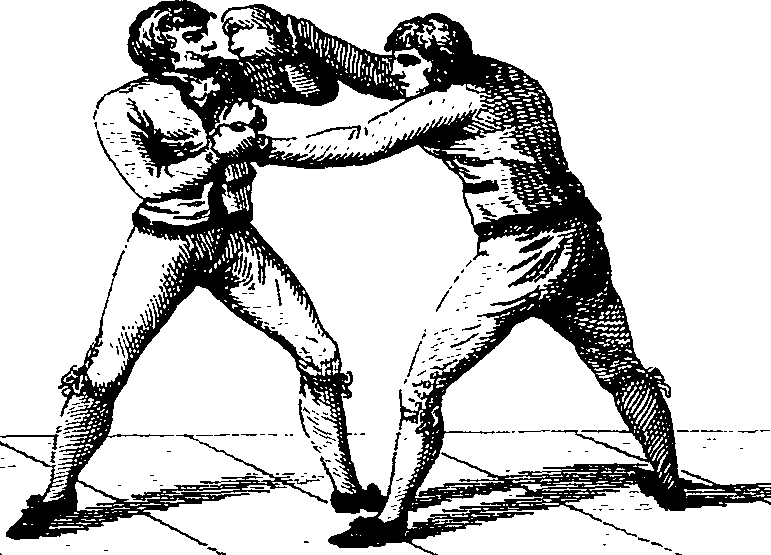
Boxer (left) using reverse cross-arm guard in 1789 manual

A 1789 boxing manual depicts a boxer defending a combination of a strike to the body and then to the head with the use of the forearm across the abdomen to block the body and the cross guard to block the head in the same way a modern crab style fighter would use. Another 1789 boxing manual, The Art of Boxing by Daniel Mendoza, depicts the reverse cross-armed guard. Boxing manuals from the early 1800s also show the cross-armed guard.

In modern boxing, variations of the crab defense were used by boxers in the 1890s to 1910s such as Tommy Ryan and Jim Jeffries. An 1893 boxing manual by James Edward Sullivan depicts the cross-armed guard used against a combination of strikes to the head and body. In 1902 Gus Ruhlin was photographed for the book The Art of Boxing and Self-Defense by Professor Mike Donovan, which depicted Ruhlin using the cross-armed guard. From the 1900s to the 1910s boxers such as Gunner Moir and Ad Wolgast used the cross-armed guard.

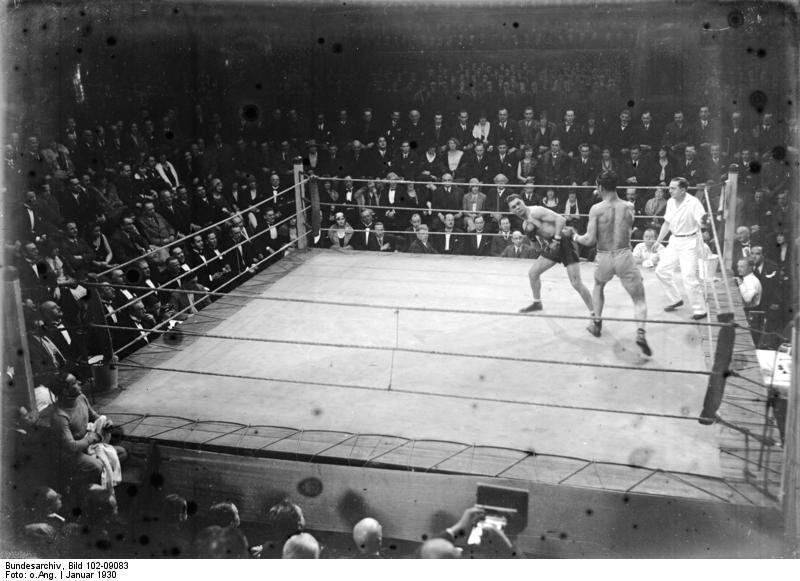
Max Schmeling (left) using crab style in film

In the 1920s and ‘30s boxers such as Paulino Uzcudun were known for using the cross-armed guard, while Max Schmeling used both the cross-armed guard and the Philly shell or Michigan defense. In the 1930s and ‘40s some fighters (for example Max Baer) were also known to use the cross-armed guard. In the 1938 short film Fisticuffs by Pete Smith, Baer, playing himself, also depicts the Philly shell or Michigan defense in the same way it is used in modern times, displaying the typical guard, shoulder block, shoulder roll, cross block, punch catch and hook cover nearly identical to modern boxers using this style. During this same time some boxers such as Pennsylvania native Charley Burley also used the Philly Shell style.

In the 1940s-60s Archie Moore's style relied heavily on the crab style of boxing, which includes the cross-armed guard, and the Philly shell or Michigan defense. During this same time boxers such as Sugar Ray Robinson used the Michigan defense. Philadelphia native George Benton used the Philly shell style throughout his career from the 1940s through the 1960s, and Gene Fulmer used the reverse cross-arm guard in the 1950s and ‘60s.

From the 1960s through the 1980s boxers such as Ken Norton were noted for the cross-armed defense. During that same time Philadelphia boxer Joe Frazier was able to seamlessly transition between different guards, but often used the cross-armed guard and the Philly shell.

In the 1980s and 1990s George Foreman used the cross-armed guard in his comeback. During that same period, some boxers (such as Pernell Whitaker) used the Philly Shell, while others such as Roger Mayweather used the Michigan defense.

Between the 1980s and 2000s Tim Witherspoon would switch between the Philly shell and the cross-armed guard. While from the 1990s to the 2010s boxers such as Floyd Mayweather Jr. and James Toney used the Michigan defense.

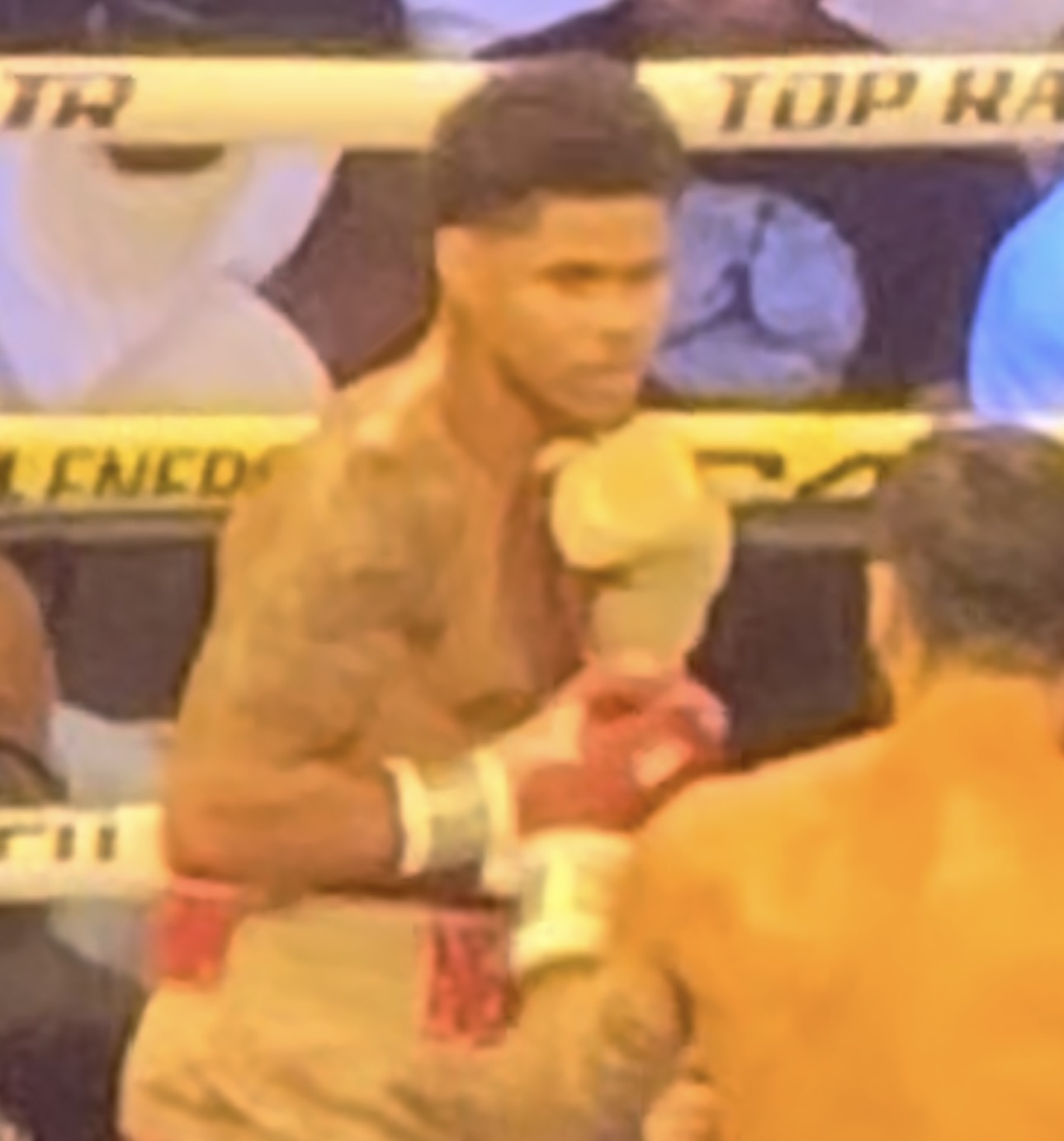
Shakur Stevenson using crab style

Between the 2000s and today fighters such as Terence Crawford use the Philly shell, and Juan Francisco Estrada uses the cross-armed guard and the Philly shell. While between the 2010s and today boxers such as Shakur Stevenson, Jaron Ennis, Devin Haney, and Naoya Inoue use the Philly Shell. Its use continues to the present day, although sometimes under alternative names such as the armadillo, stonewall, or hitman defenses.

== Boxing ==
Crab style can be used at all ranges and in all of the four boxing styles : In-Fighter, Out-Boxer, Slugger and Boxer-Puncher.

In fighter: Crab style often provides two lines of head defense. For example, the lead arm can be used to wedge block, elbow block, shoulder block or shoulder roll to defend against the jab and cross, while the rear hand can be used as a cross block to provide a second line of defense against the same punches in case the lead block fails. This allows an in-fighter to move forward while being able to adequately defend in the process. Examples of In-Fighters who have used the crab style include Joe Frazier and James Toney.

Out-fighter: The crab style relies heavily on one-handed or no-handed defense. For example, the lead wedge block can block both the jab and the cross leaving the rear hand free to punch even while blocking. Alternatively, the rear cross block can defend against both the jab and the cross leaving the lead hand open to punch even while defending. The shoulder roll uses no hands for defense and leaves both hands free to punch while defending.

This allows an out-fighter to attack even while defending making it easier for them to disengage and land long-range punches even while defending. Examples of out-fighters who have used the crab style include Floyd Mayweather Jr. and Shakur Stevenson.

Slugger: Sluggers often throw predictable punching patterns (single punches with obvious leads) which can leave them open for counterpunching. Sluggers can, therefore, rely on the crossed-arm guard of the crab style to defend if they miss a power shot and are forced to defend. Examples of sluggers who have used the crab style include George Foreman, Max Baer and Jim Jeffries.

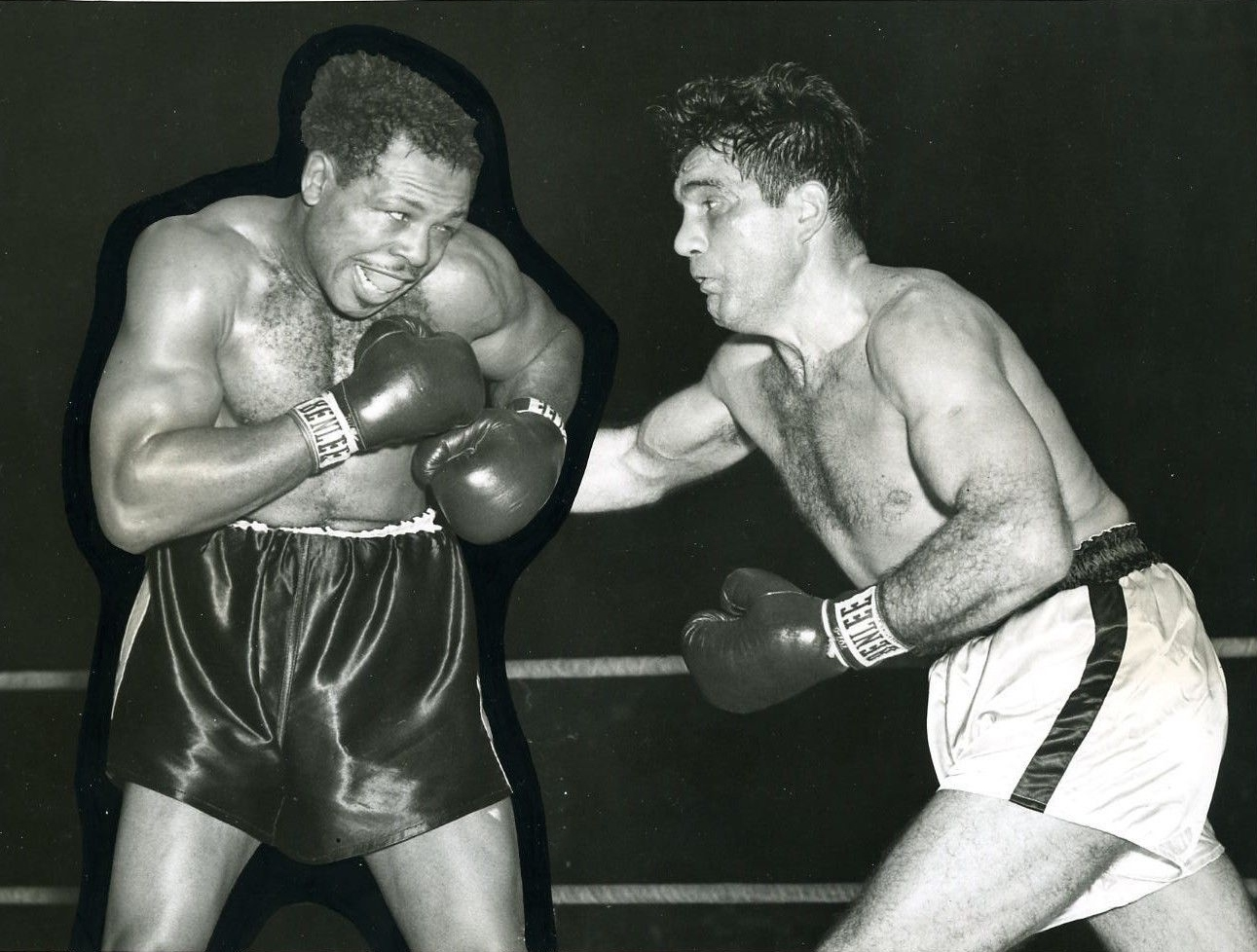
Archie Moore (left) using Crab Style

Boxer-Puncher: As boxer-punchers often use tactics used by out-boxers and swarmers, they can also benefit from use of the crab style. Examples of boxer-punchers who have used the crab style include Sugar Ray Robinson and Archie Moore.

== Kickboxing ==
Kickboxing includes elements of boxing and martial arts that use kicking techniques. Many kickboxers have, therefore, used the crab defense. Some examples are Bill Wallace, Don Wilson, Alvin Prouder, Cliff Thomas and Manson Gibson.

Crab style is used to defend punches in kickboxing largely the same as it is used in boxing with few exceptions:

In styles of kickboxing where modern boxing gloves are worn the padding of the glove can help absorb the force of roundhouse kicks to the head. In styles of kickboxing where smaller gloves are worn, such as ONE Championship, or no gloves are worn, crab style fighters may be knocked out from the force of the roundhouse kick while using a hook cover against the attack due to the lack of padding to help absorb the impact. Even when wearing boxing gloves kickboxers often get an arm broken while using the hook cover from the force of a roundhouse kick if it hits their arm instead of the padded glove. Kickboxers are, therefore, more likely to keep their rear hand in a cross block or punch catch position when using a Philly shell or Michigan defense type guard compared to boxers who are more likely to keep their hand on centerline in a fist position with their thumb facing them as they use a hook cover less often than boxers.

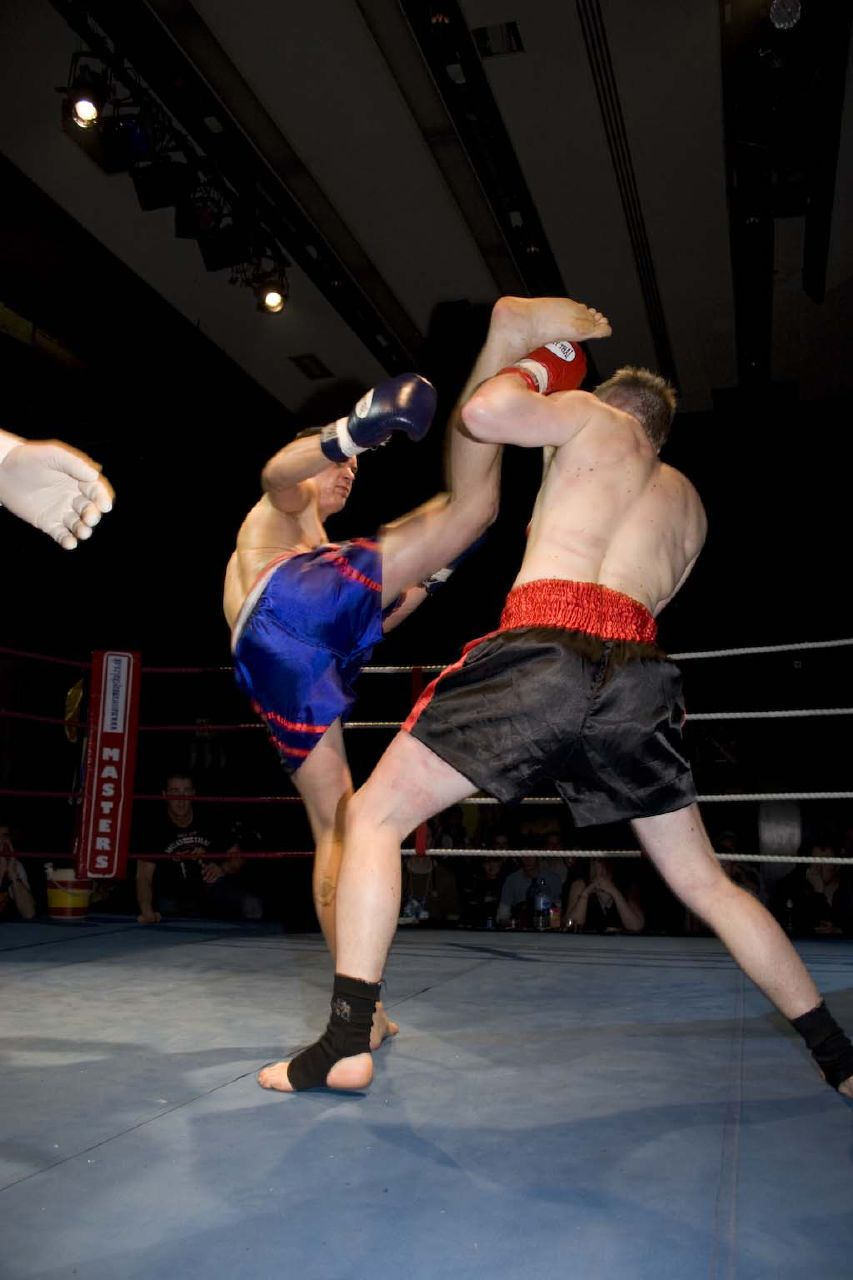
Kickboxer (right) using a leverage block against roundhouse kick

Crab style kickboxers often use leverage blocks against both hook punches and kicks such as the high roundhouse kick. As such the rear hand in the punch catch or cross block position makes using the leverage block quicker. The leverage block gets under the roundhouse kick redirecting it by pushing it upwards.

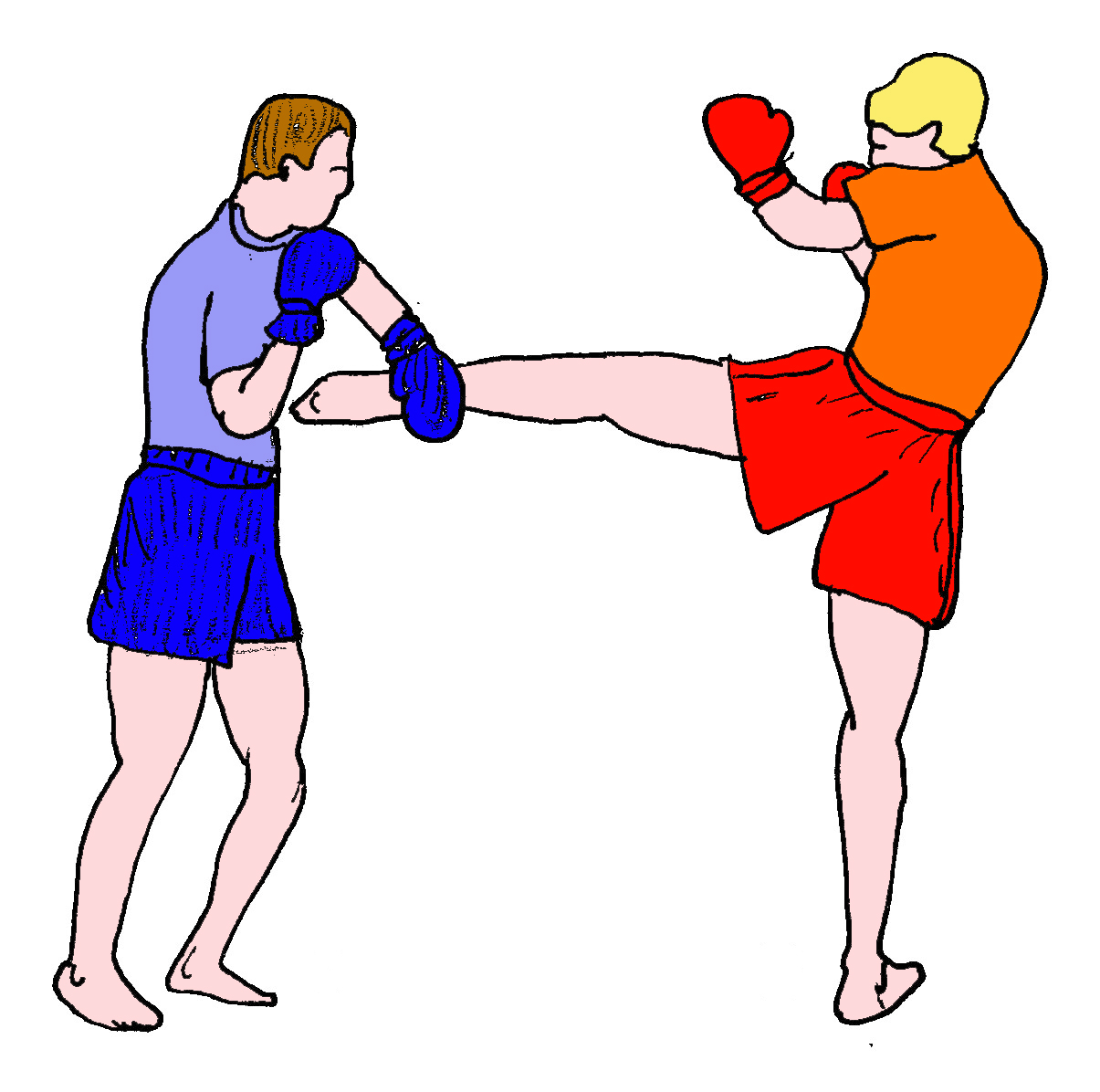
Kickboxer (left) using a cross parry against roundhouse kick

Crab style kickboxers also use cross parries against roundhouse kicks. A cross parry is a defensive technique used to deflect roundhouse kicks aimed at the head and body. It involves moving the arm across the body in a half-circle motion, typically starting from the outside and moving inwards, to clear the kick to the side. This technique is effective because it avoids absorbing the impact from the kick directly, which can be more forceful and put kickboxer off balance, instead, it guides the kick away from the intended target.

In a closed stance the kickboxer uses their lead hand to cross parry their opponent's lead roundhouse kick and their rear hand to cross parry their opponent's rear roundhouse kick. In an open stance a kickboxer uses their lead hand to cross parry their opponent's rear roundhouse kick and rear hand to cross parry their opponent's lead roundhouse kick. Since the arms are already crossed in the crab style guards, this makes cross parrying quicker.

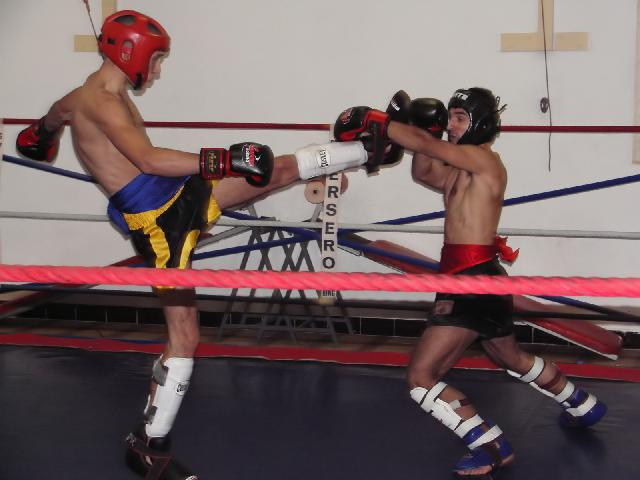
Kickboxer (right) using a lead cross parry against roundhouse kick with the rear arm in a leverage block position if cross parry fails

Like with punches, crab style often provides two lines of head defense against kicks. For example, a crab style fighter can use the lead arm to cross parry a roundhouse kick as a first line of defense and the rear arm positioned for a leverage block if the cross parry fails. Alternatively, the lead arm can be used to leverage block and the rear arm positioned to cross parry in case the leverage block fails.

Another difference is that unlike boxing, kickboxing often allows for spinning kicks and spinning backfists. Instead of a shoulder roll, the kickboxer may, instead, opt for spinning techniques.

== Muay Thai ==
Some Muay Thai fighters that also have western boxing backgrounds have used the Crab Style in Muay Thai. Examples include Samart Payakaroon, who is also a former WBC boxing champion, Somluck Kamsing who was an Olympic gold medalist in boxing and Veeraphol Sahaprom who was a WBC and WBA champion. Many Muay Thai fighters without western boxing backgrounds, however, still use the cross-armed guard, also called the double forearm guard in Muay Thai.

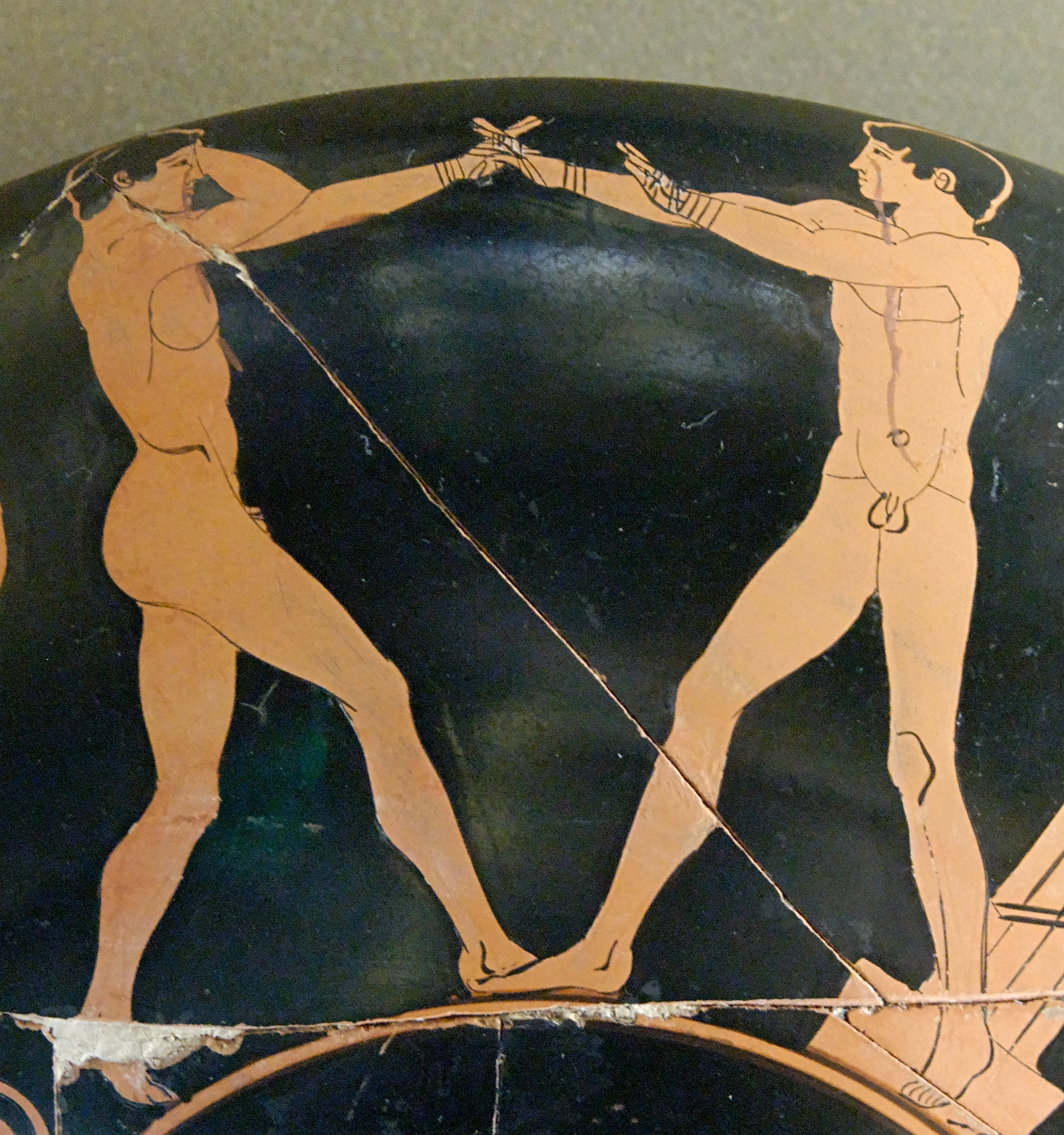
Boxer (left) using Dracula guard on pottery dated to 470 BC

Some Muay Thai fighters, such as Dieselnoi, Yodwicha Por.Boonsit and Buakaw, use the Dracula guard, a variation of the Crab Style. The Dracula guard uses one arm, usually the lead arm, in a long guard and the other arm, usually the rear arm, in the cross block position. Another variation of the Crab Style used in Muay Thai is the Diamond Guard.

== Mixed Martial Arts ==
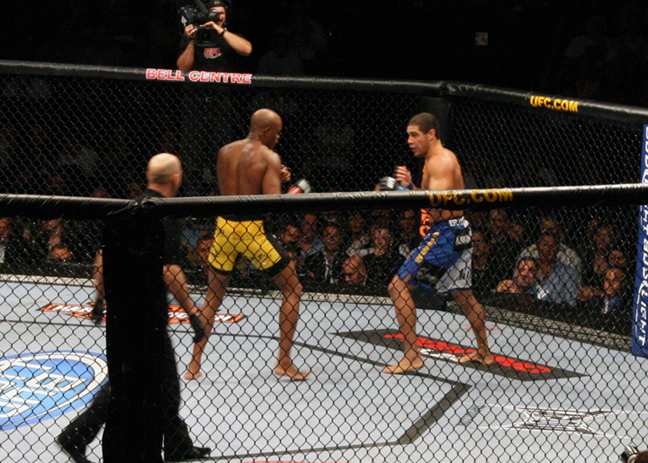
Anderson Silva (left) using crab style

Mixed Martial Arts, or MMA, also includes elements of boxing and kickboxing so mixed martial artists have also used the crab style. Crab defense is also used against tie-ups in the clinch, and for takedown defense.

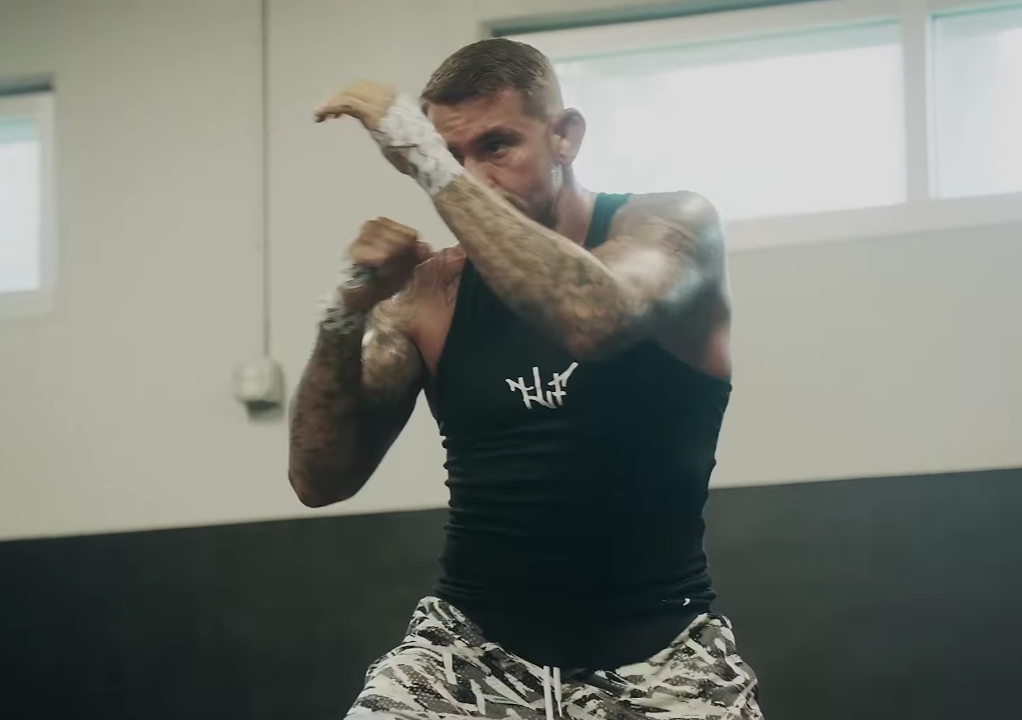
Dustin Poirier using stonewall guard

Crab defense has been used by many MMA fighters including Sean Strickland, Ilia Topuria, Dustin Poirier, King Green, Yoel Romero, Anderson Silva, Mauricio Ruffy, Caio Borralho and Aiemann Zahabi It is also taught by MMA trainers such as Firas Zahabi.

== Sport Taekwondo ==
Styles of martial arts have different techniques, and these techniques can vary even within styles. Some styles of martial arts have techniques similar to the Crab Style. Traditional Taekwondo is designed for self-defense. Practitioners of Taekwondo, or taekwondoin, often begin blocks without a guard, but in the ready position (joon bi or junbi) instead. Some schools teach that the Downward Block (Naeryeo Makgi), Twisting Block (Biteureo Makgi) and Scissor Block (Gawi Makgi) have a chamber position that is very similar to the reverse cross arm guard. While some schools teach the Upward Block (Ollyeo Makgi), Outward Block (Bakkat Makgi) and Knife Hand Block (Sonnal Makgi) have a chamber position that is very similar to the cross arm guard. Some schools consider this chamber position to represent a parry position like is used with the Crab Style.

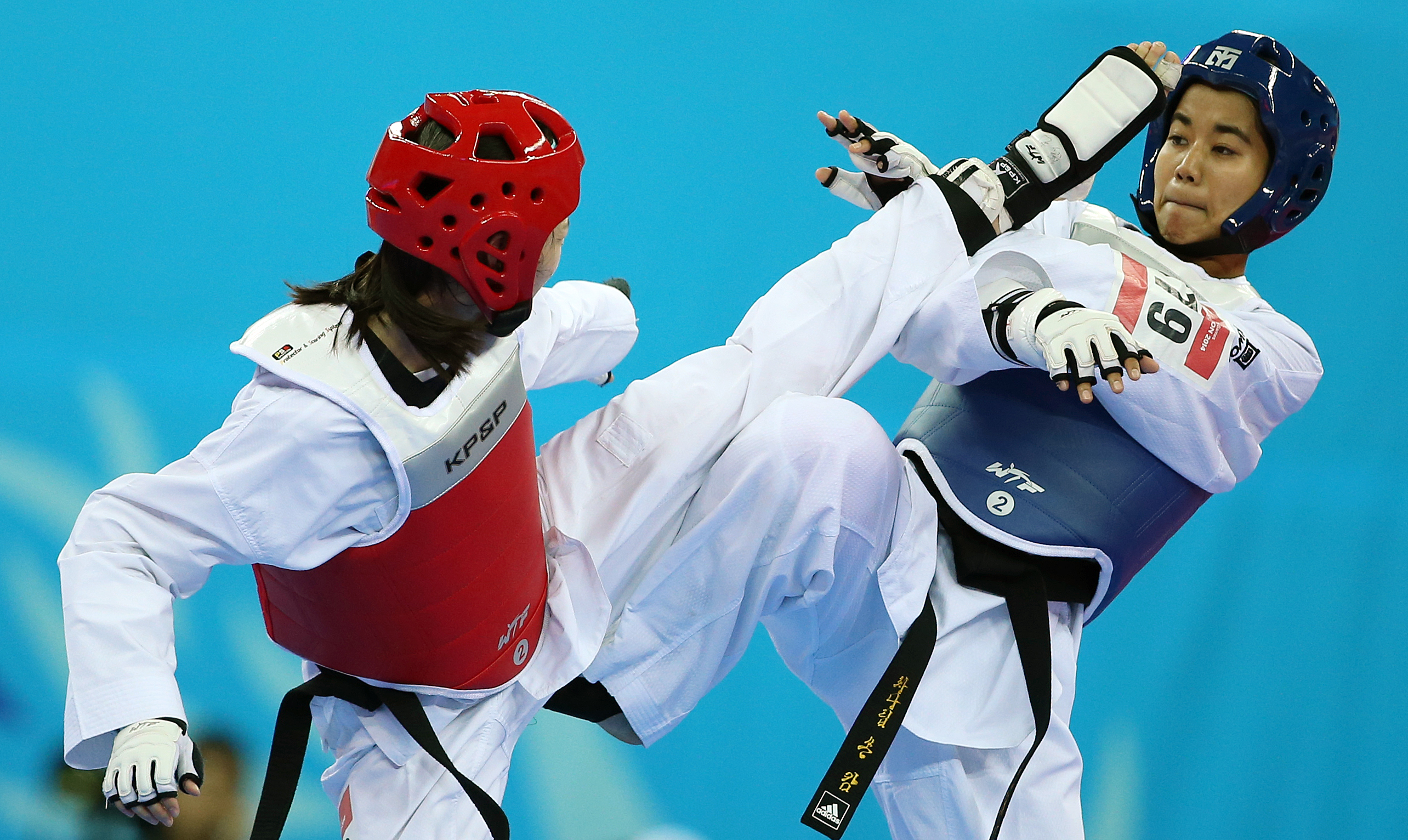
Taekwondoin (right) using cross-armed guard

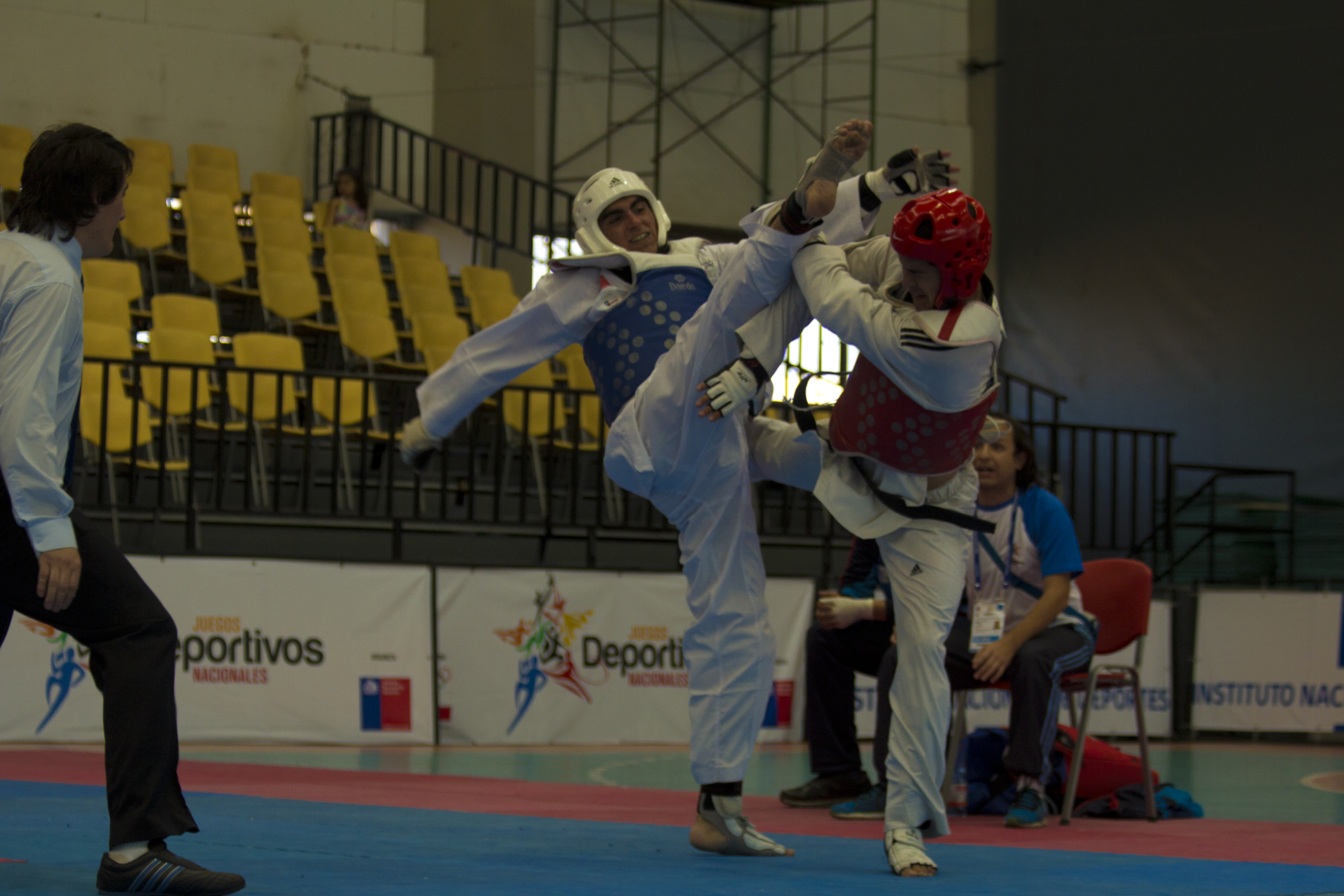
Taekwondoin (right) using cross-armed guard

Taekwondoin, may also use techniques similar to Crab Defense while sparring or kyorugi. Taekwondoin often use a bladed stance. While doing so Taekwondoin often adopt a guard for kyorugi where the lead arm is held across the abdomen with the lead shoulder raised to block against body kicks and punches. The lead and rear arm are both held in the same type of positions as the Philly Shell or Michigan Defense. The rear hand is used on centerline or in the cross block position to defend against high kicks and punches and the rear forearm and elbow used against body shots.

Taekwondoin, especially those who participate under the World Taekwondo rules, often use a cross-armed guard or reverse cross-armed guard to block kicks to the midsection. They also often block kicks to the back with one arm using a low block, or Arae-makgi, while the other arm uses a cross block to protect the head. The lead, and sometimes rear, arm can also be used as a wedge block, or Olgul Makki, to defend against high kicks and punches. The shoulder roll is also used, often while leaning back to avoid a high kick, but spinning techniques can be used instead.

== Sport Karate ==
Traditional Karate is designed for self-defense so practitioners of Karate, or karateka, often begin blocks without a guard or in the ready position (yoi). Karate blocks often go from the yoi position to a chamber position as the first part of a defensive technique. Some schools teach that the Knife-hand block (Shuto-uke) has a chamber position that is very similar to the cross arm guard.

Some schools teach that the low sweeping block (Gedan barai) has a chamber position that is very similar to the reverse cross arm guard. Some schools consider this chamber position to represent a parry defense like is used with the Crab Style.

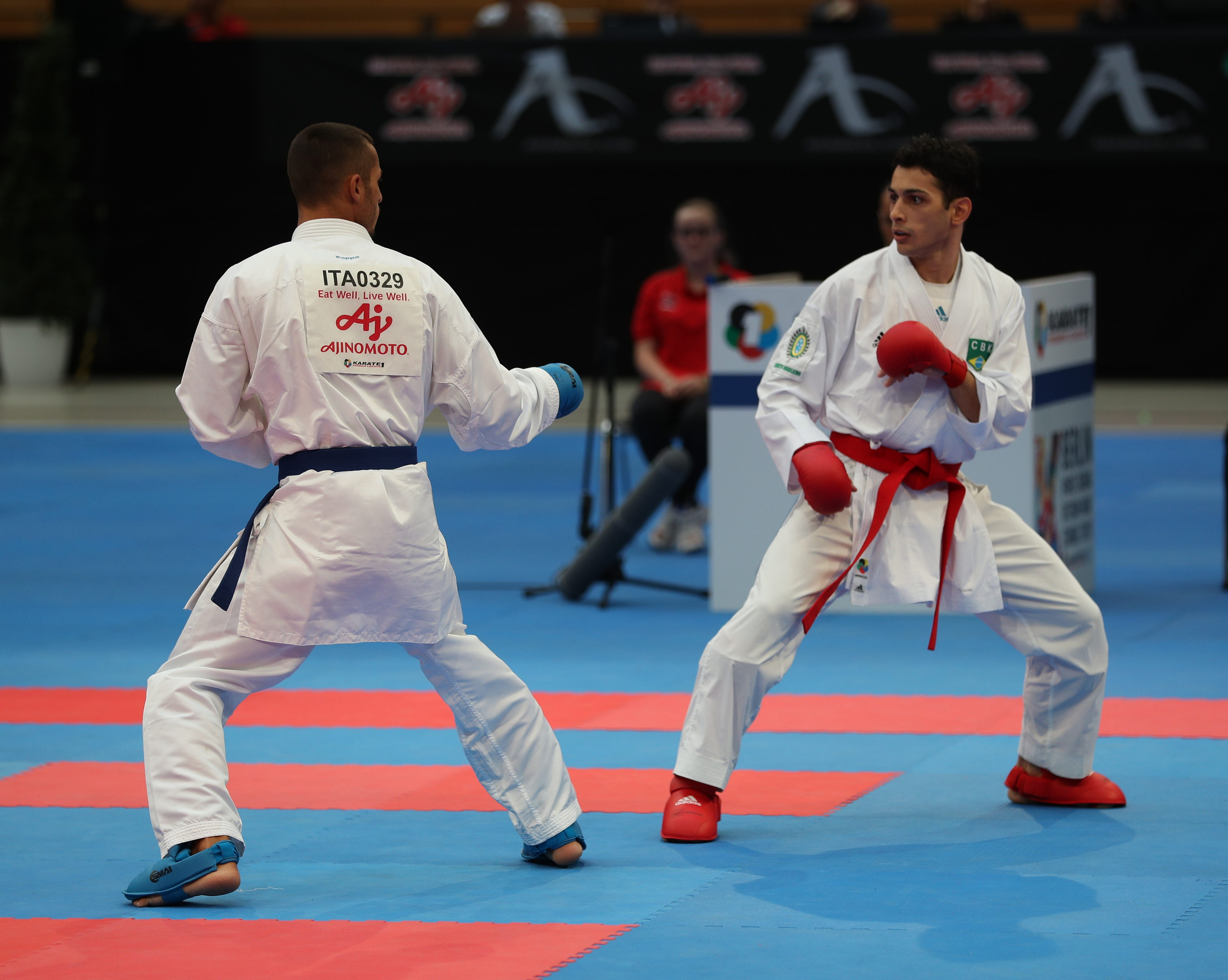
Karateka (right) using a Philly Shell type guard

The Crab Style is often used in Karate, as it is used in Taekwondo, during sparring or kumite. Under point fighting rules without grappling, such as the WAKO semi-contact rules, the Philly Shell type guard has often been used by some of the greatest fighters of all time like Linda Denley. Karateka primarily use two guards during kumite, one which is similar to the classic bare-knuckle boxing guard, and the other in the same position as the Philly Shell where the lead arm is placed across the abdomen, to protect the midsection against punches and kicks, and the rear hand generally placed in a punch catch, cross guard or thumb facing the chest or chin position to protect the upper body and head.

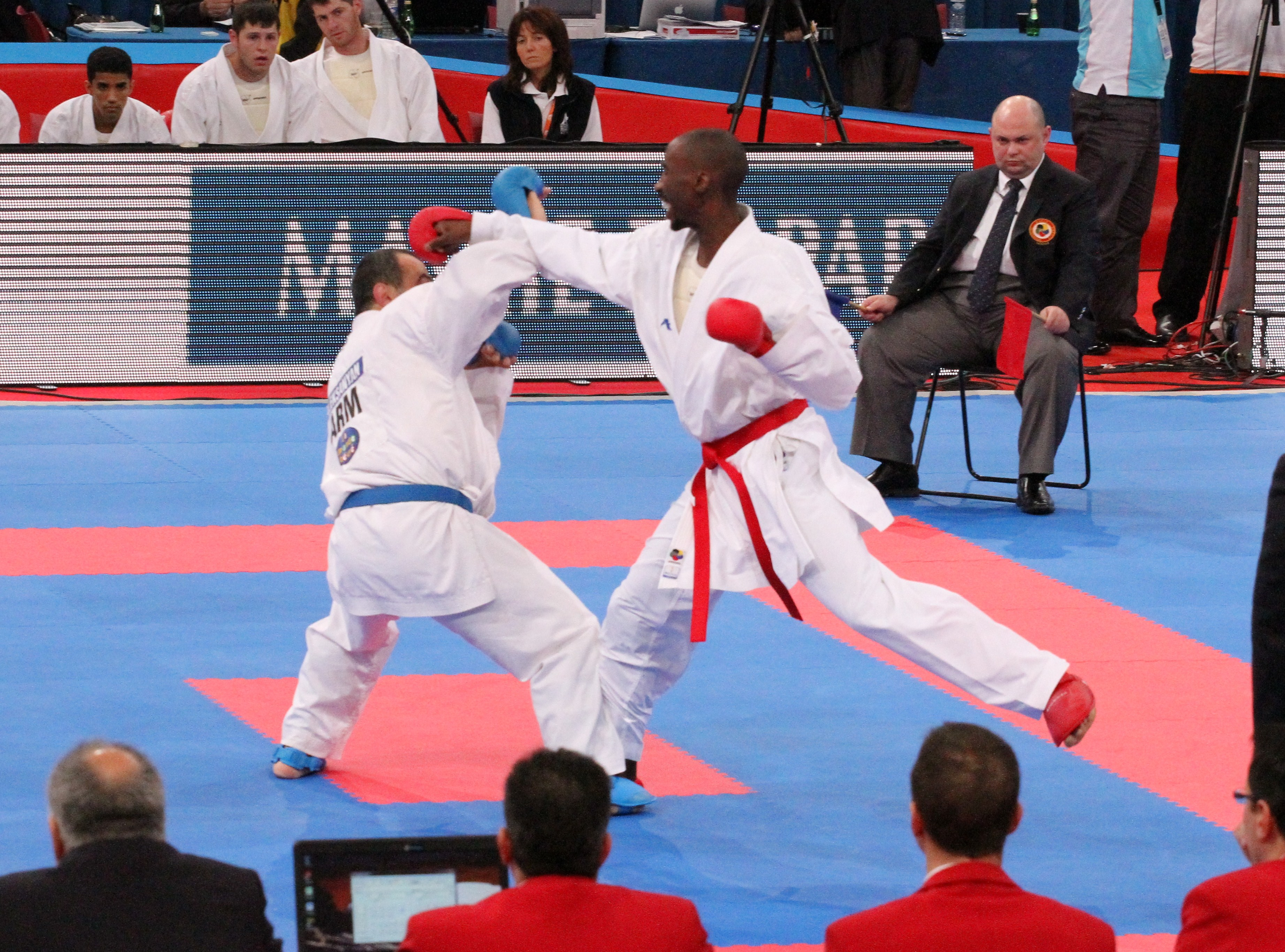
Karateka (left) using a wedge block or Age-uke against punch

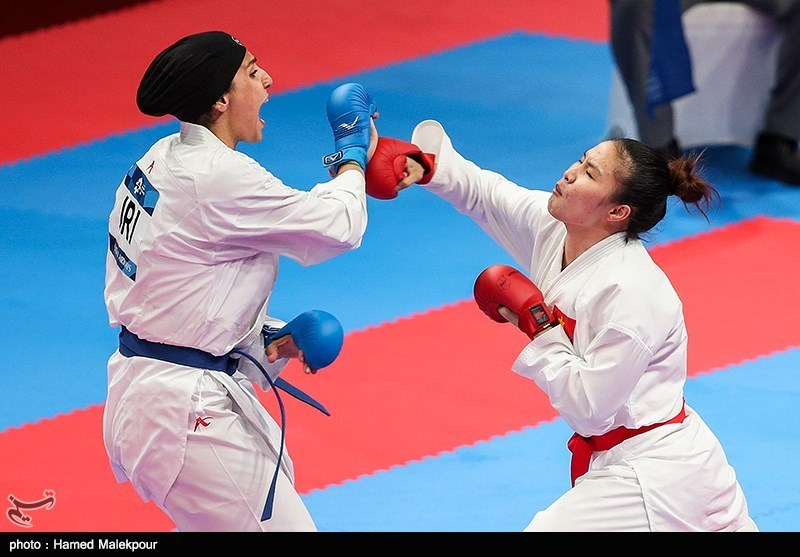
Karateka (left) using a punch catch

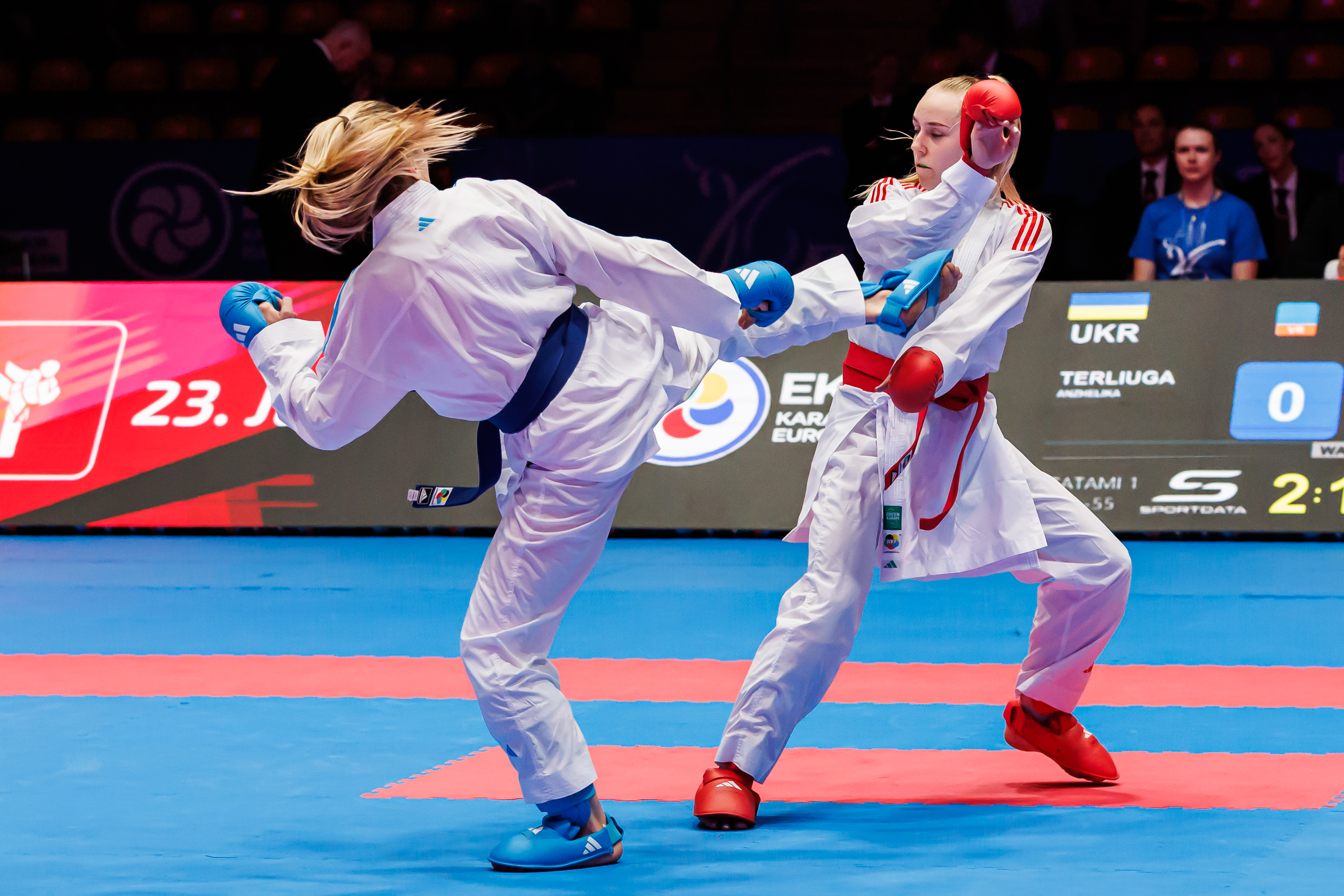
Karateka (right) using a lead cross block

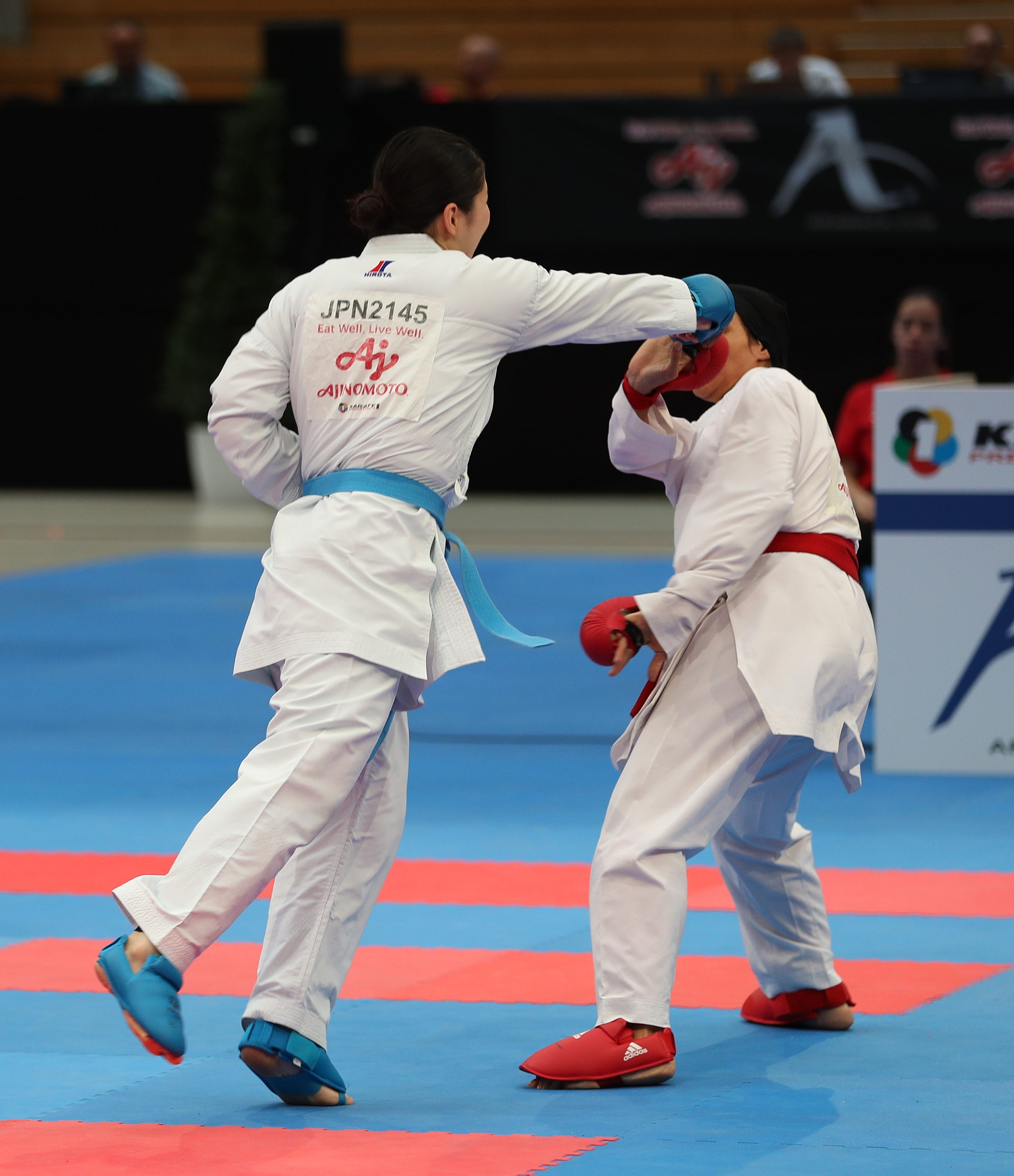
Karateka (right) using a rear cross block

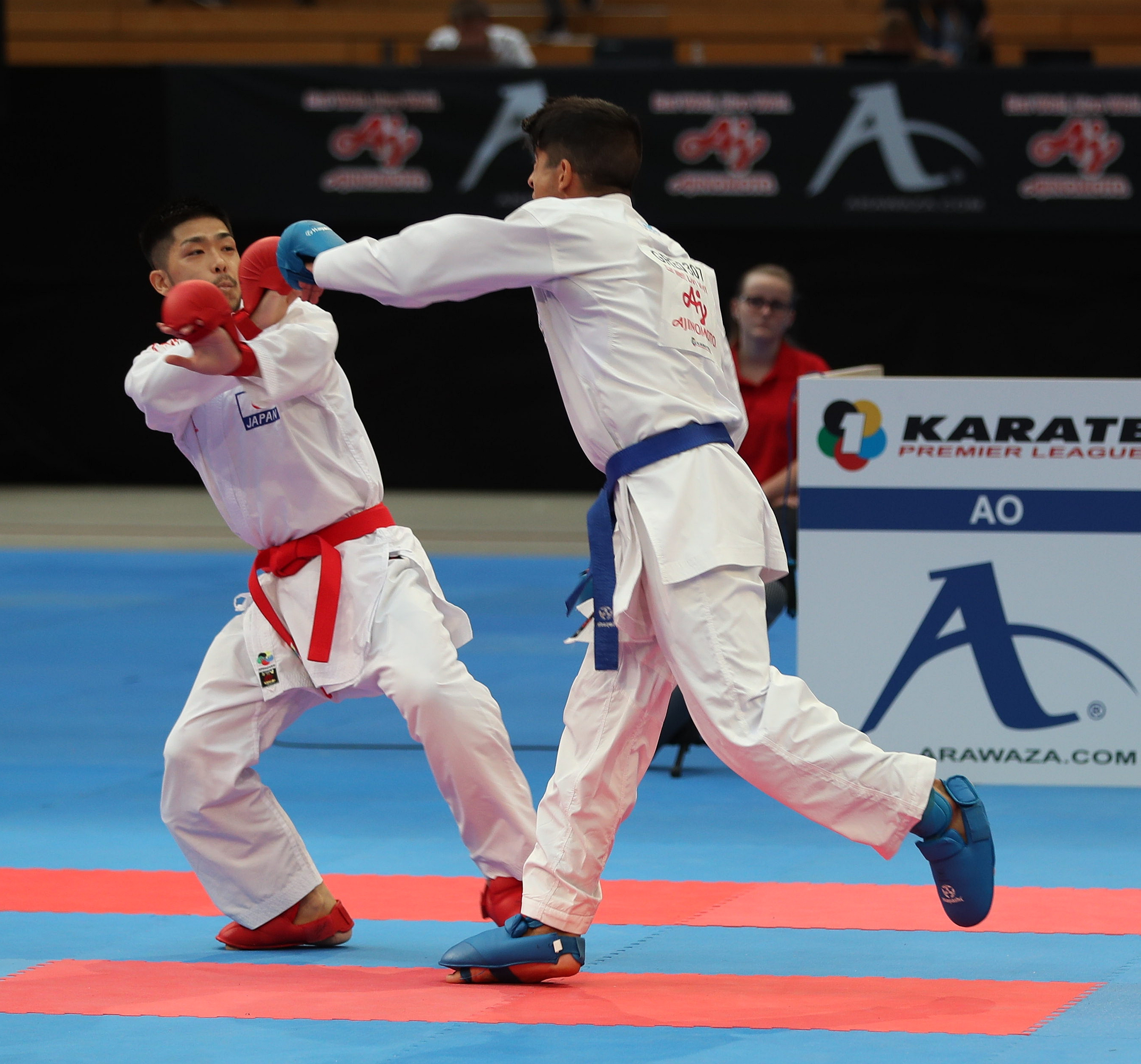
Karateka (left) using a cross-armed guard

Karateka also use some crab style blocks against punches during kumite such as the wedge block, called Age-uke in Karate, as well as the punch catch, cross block and cross-armed guard. The karate technique Hasami Uke, which is like the cross-armed block, is also used against circular kicks.

Sport Karate kumite rules, such as the World Karate Federation rules, often allow holding of the uniform, or gi, and hitting as well as takedowns. Karateka often use a bladed stance during kumite similar to the crab style, but different stances, such as sanchin dachi, are also used when at close range or clinching. The crab defense provides the additional benefit of defense against grappling. Since the lead arm rests against the abdomen and the rear arm rests across the lapel, this provides a passive defense against hand grabs, and upper and lower lapel grabs. Active defensive techniques such as wedge blocks and parries are also used against grabs. Additionally, since the arms are pressed against the body in the crab defense, this makes it difficult for an opponent to use common grappling tie-ups in the clinch such as underhooks and overhooks, whereas because the crab defense uses a low lead hand this can be used for an underhook position to counter takedowns.

== Sport Jujutsu ==
As with Sport Karate, Sport Jujutsu uses punching, kicking and grappling from the standing position as well as a gi. The crab defense is sometimes used in Sport Jujutsu to defend against grabs, tie-ups, strikes and takedowns. The Crab Defense is used from the standing position and should not be confused with ground fighting techniques such as the Crab Ride and the Boston Crab.
