= Centerline theory (boxing) =

Fighting Theory

Centerline theory is a foundational concept in boxing and some other martial arts. It refers to an imaginary vertical line running down the middle of a fighter's body. Centerline is important both offensively and defensively and is crucial for effective striking and defense.

== Boxing ==
In boxing, the centerline is an imaginary straight line that runs down the middle of a boxer's body when they face their opponent. When two fighters square off, their centerlines align, creating a direct path for punches. The centerline is particularly emphasized when defending against straight punches like the jab and cross. Staying on the centerline makes a fighter vulnerable. Skilled boxers constantly shift off this line to avoid attacks, reducing the likelihood of being hit cleanly.

A first line of defense against the jab and cross is simply moving your head off the centerline. This is typically enough to evade it. A boxer who remains stationary on the centerline is an easy target. To defend effectively, fighters must use angles. Moving laterally or at angles disrupts an opponent's offense, making it harder for them to land clean shots. Techniques like shoulder rolls and slipping rely on shifting the head and upper body off the centerline while maintaining counterpunching opportunities.

This highlights the defensive importance of the centerline, where a boxer must either slip punches by moving off the line or use their guard to block incoming strikes. When slipping past the punch isn't an option boxers use their guard to protect the vulnerable parts of their body. Offensively, most punches, especially in boxing, move towards the centerline.

Attacking the opponents centerline allows a boxer to land straight punches, hooks and uppercuts with maximum efficiency while disrupting their opponent's balance. Straight punches (jabs, crosses) and combinations are most effective when thrown down the centerline because they travel the shortest distance and have the highest chance of landing cleanly, but boxers must move their own head off of centerline when doing so to avoid counterpunches.

By stepping off at an angle, a fighter can create openings for counterpunches. For example, in a closed stance, slipping outside an opponent's jab and firing a jab to the body exploits their exposed centerline, but a boxer would want to move their own head off of centerline while doing so. Using feints and misdirection can draw an opponent's guard to one side opening up the center for straight punches. A well-placed cross to the solar plexus (especially against opposite-stance opponents) capitalizes on centerline vulnerability.

Tommy Ryan is one of the earliest modern boxers to use Crab style while emphasizing crouching and angling to protect the centerline while countering effectively. Crab style boxer's, such as the Philly Shell fighters, stance is characterized by a bladed posture, with the head leaned slightly back and to their right (for orthodox stance).

Moving their head off the centerline makes opponents' straight punches (like the right cross) travel farther. This aligns with centerline theory by manipulating angles to evade attacks down the midline. The Philly Shell fighter conceals the centerline by tucking the chin behind the lead shoulder and keeping the rear hand high for protection. The lead shoulder forward protects the chin and deflects jabs. This minimizes target exposure. The rear hand functions as a shield and guards against hooks and straights. Keeping the weight on the back foot facilitates head movement and counters. Using shoulder deflection also neutralizes power shots.

Peek-a-Boo boxing, a style developed by Cus D'Amato, also uses a guard that protects against centerline strikes and puts a huge emphasis on constantly moving off of centerline through slipping, bobbing and pivots. Peek-a-Boo style boxers often use the D’amato shift to get off of centerline while creating angles to counterpunch from.
