= Blocking (martial arts) =

Martial arts move

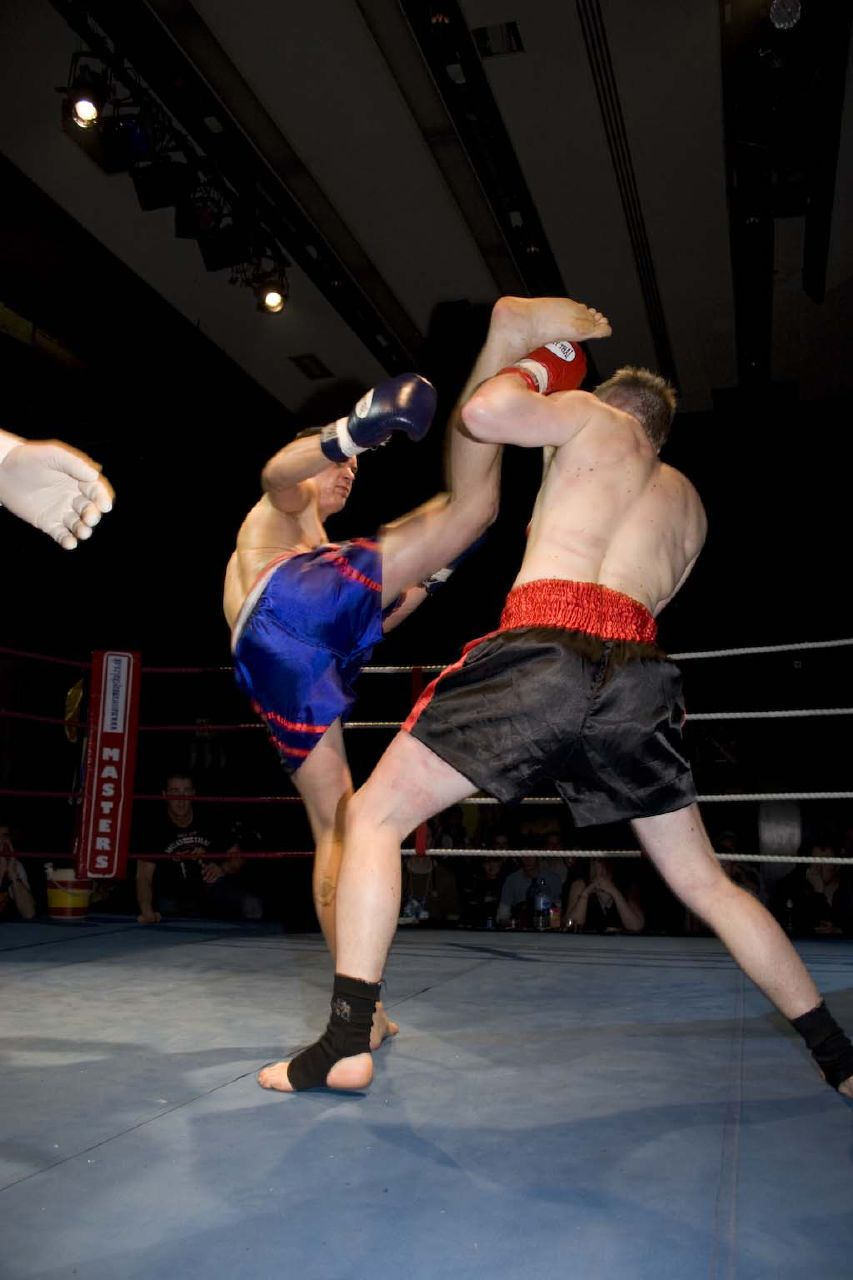
- A fighter raises his hands to block the opponent's roundhouse kick.

In martial arts, blocking is the act of stopping or deflecting an opponent's attack using any part of the body. A block usually consists of placing a limb across the line of the attack. A successful block prevents injurious contact.

== Examples in specific arts ==
Styles and types of blocking, as well as terminology, vary widely among the various martial arts. In Japanese martial arts such as Karate, these techniques are referred to as uke waza. Examples include age uke (rising block) and shuto uke (knife hand guarding block). In Korean martial arts such as taekwondo, these techniques are referred to as makgi(막기), with some examples being chukyeo makgi (rising block) and onkal daebi makgi (knifehand guarding block). Some martial arts, such as Capoeira, reject blocking techniques completely as they consider them too inefficient. In Capoeira, they use evasion instead of blocking.

== Types of blocks ==
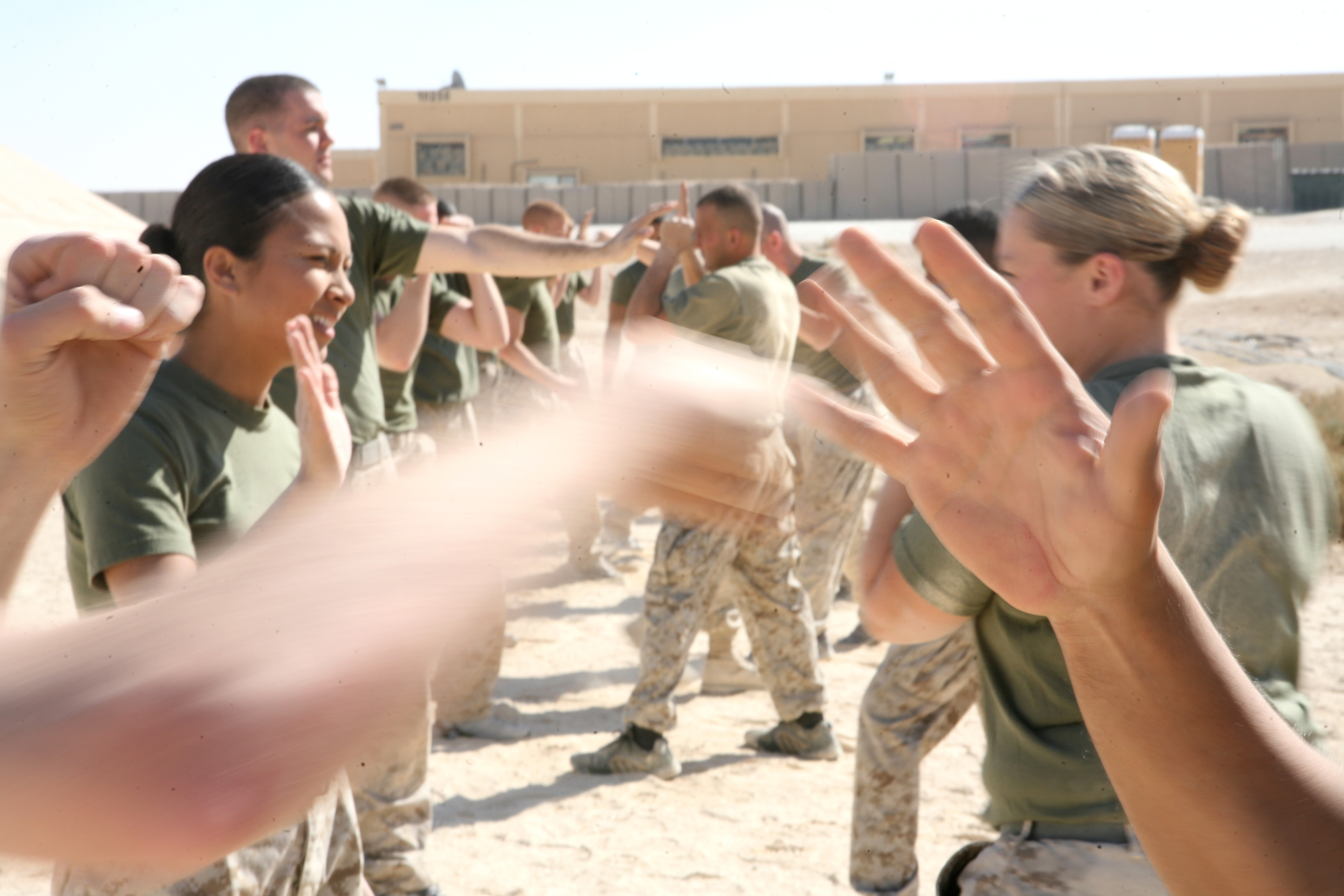
Palm block

=== Inside blocks ===
An inside block deflects a strike away from the defender and away from the attacker. For example, against a straight punch to the face, an inside forearm block would aim to meet the inside of the forearm of the attacker, pushing the punch outward, leaving the opponents facing each other which also helps in counterattack.

=== Outside blocks ===
An outside block deflects a strike away from the defender and across the attacker. For example, against a straight punch to the face, an outside forearm block would aim to meet the outside forearm of the attacker, pushing the punch outward, leaving the defender slightly to the side of the strike causing it to miss. Typically, because of the angles involved, inward blocks are used against attacks aimed at the torso.

=== High blocks ===
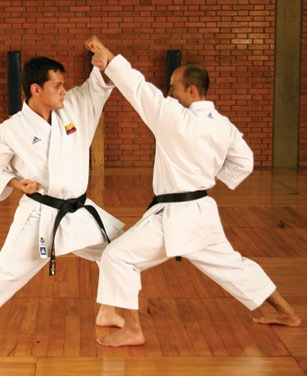
A high block against a face punch

A high block deflects a downward strike such as a hammer fist, a stick or a face punch from a taller opponent. The chamber starts low with the hand in a relaxed fist across the abdomen with the palm facing inward and in high block, face punch should be blocked in diagonal shape

=== Low blocks ===
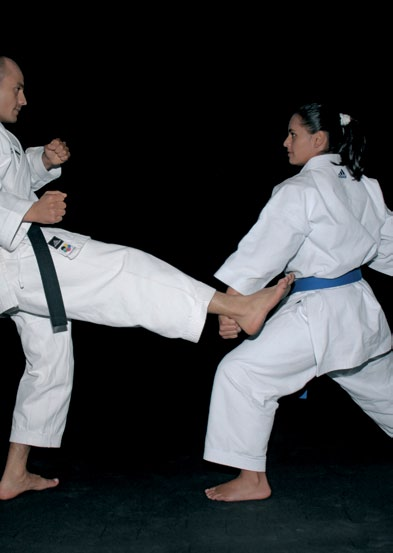
A low block against a low crescent kick

A low block deflects an inward strike directed at the stomach or ribs such as a roundhouse kick.

=== Parries ===
Parries are executed against the attacker by quickly pushing their arm or leg away to the right or left side( as it is considered as a block) and counterattacking when the procedure is done.

=== Other types of blocks and alternatives ===
More complex blocks include the circular block, X block, high X block, twin forearm guarding block, hooking block, and pole block.

Offensive techniques can also be used to block. For example, a kick or palm strike can be used to neutralize an incoming blow. It is also common to use the knee to block leg attacks from an opponent.

Blocks are considered by some to be the most direct and least subtle of defensive techniques. Other ways of avoiding attack include evasion, trapping, slipping and deflection of the oncoming attack; this approach is often referred to as the application of 'soft' techniques (see hard and soft (martial arts)).
