= Long guard =

Fighting style

Long or extended guards are some of the oldest guards in combat sports. Long guards were used in Ancient Greek boxing and are still used today in modern boxing. Long guards and hybrid long guards are also used in other martial arts such as pankration, Muay Thai, and mixed martial arts.

== Guards ==
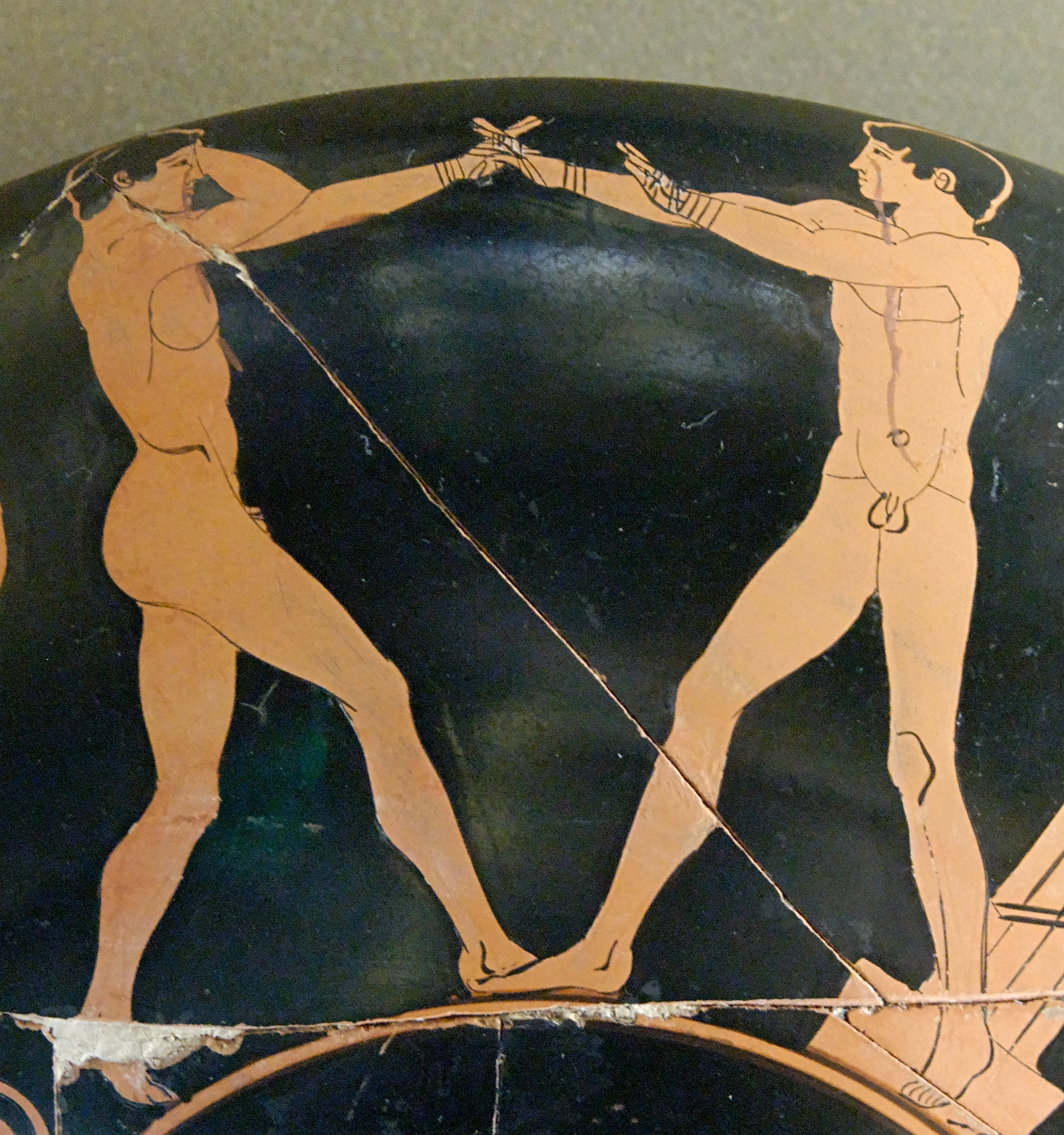
Boxer (left) using Dracula guard and Boxer (right) using Mummy guard on pottery dated to 470 BC

Long Guards consist of the Double Long Guard or Mummy Guard, and hybrid guards such as the Classic Long Guard and the Dracula Guard. In boxing these guards are often used by taller fighters or fighters with longer reach to keep opponents out of punching range, but shorter fighters or fighters with shorter reach often use them intermittently.

=== Mummy guard ===
The Mummy Guard consists of using both arms extended. The elbows are usually slightly bent with both palms facing the opponent. The chin is tucked and shoulders are usually raised to block the chin. The name Mummy guard comes from how Muhammad Ali described this guard.

In modern boxing Mummy Guard fighters can use their extended hands to block the vision of their opponents, especially when their opponents are using Classic or Peek-a-boo guards. When boxers are in a closed stance the extended rear hand of the Mummy Guard is used to control the lead hand of the opponent. This smothers the opponents jab rather than actively defending against it. This is effective against opponents using the Classic guards or Peek-a-boo guard, but is less effective against opponents with a low lead hand such as Crab Style fighters. When using the Mummy Guard the fighter uses defensive traffic, making straight punches unable to land via parries, hand traps and framing. This forces the opponent to use slower hooks around the arms.

When used by taller fighters or fighters with a longer reach it makes hooks and uppercuts difficult to land. If a fighter using the Mummy guard does not have a height or reach advantage it does make them more vulnerable to hooks, but they can raise their shoulders to defend hooks and bring their elbows in against uppercuts.

The Mummy Guard, however, makes powerful crosses, hooks and uppercuts more difficult as the arms must be brought back first to strike. This also telegraphs power punches making it easier for opponents to evade them. The Mummy Guard also leaves the lead side of the body exposed. Opponents know how long your reach is and can gauge distance. If an opponent uses lateral movement to get around the Mummy Guard and closes the distance they can land punches before the extended hands are recoiled to block.

The Mummy Guard has been used by boxers such as George Foreman, Sandy Saddler and Miguel Canto.

=== Classic long guard ===
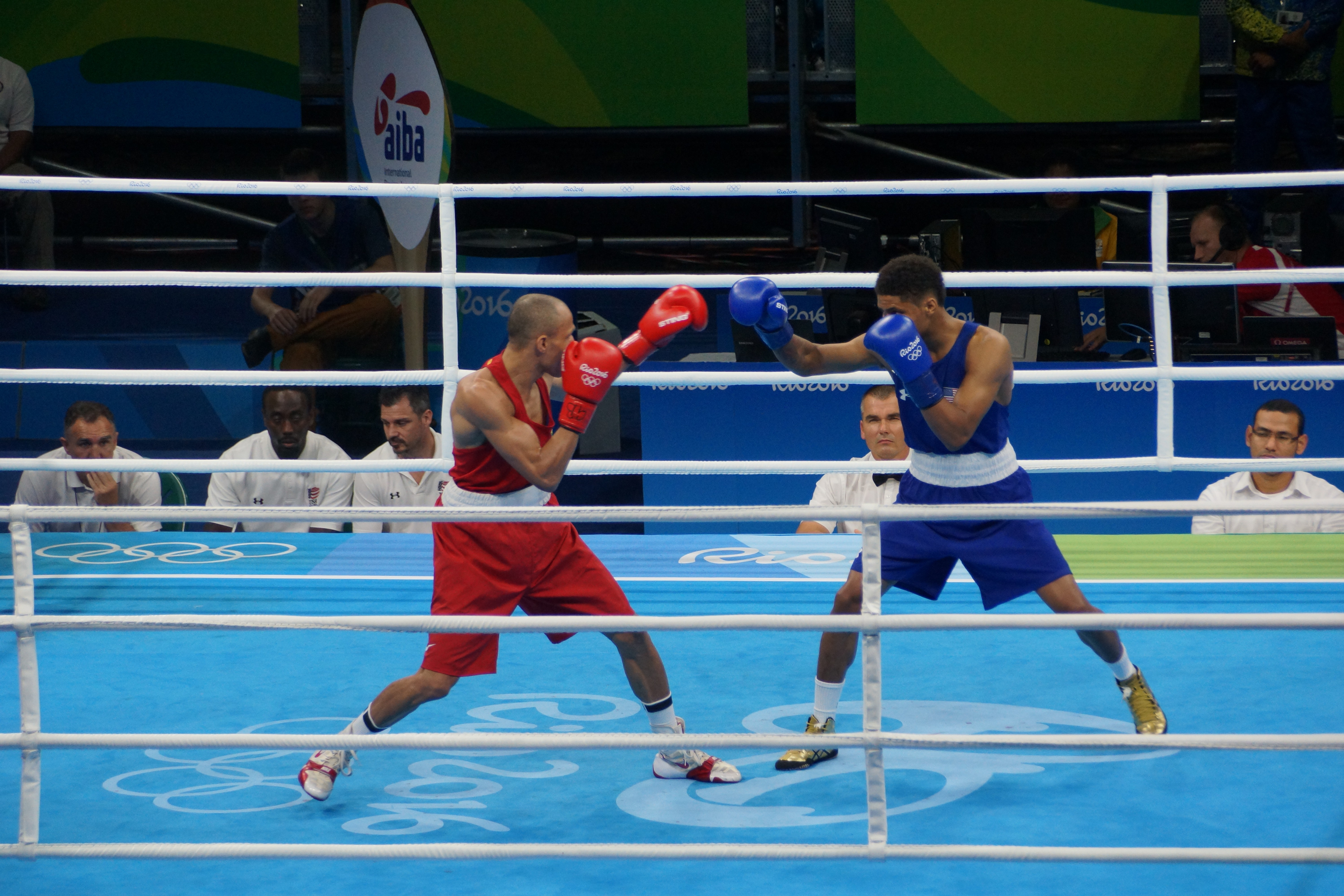
Boxers using Classic Long Guard

This is a hybrid guard usually combining the extended lead arm (left for an orthodox fighter and right for a southpaw) of the mummy guard and keeping the rear hand (right for an orthodox fighter and left for a southpaw) in one of the modern classic guards, typically with the rear arm at a 90 degree or less angle with the glove pressed against the side of the face. With the Classic Long Guard the lead hand is used to block the opponent's vision, for distance control, parries, hand traps and framing. The rear hand is still available for power punching and passive defense against hooks.

The Classic Long Guard, however, provides little passive defense against uppercuts and straight punches that get past the extended lead arm. The extended lead arm also makes using powerful lead hooks and lead uppercuts more difficult as the lead arm must be brought back first to strike. This also telegraphs these punches making it easier for opponents to evade them. The Classic Long Guard also leaves the lead side of the body exposed. Opponents also know how long your reach is and can gauge distance. Some of these disadvantages can be ameliorated by switching between the Classic Long Guard and other guards.

=== Dracula guard ===
This is a hybrid guard usually combining the extended lead arm (left for an orthodox fighter and right for a southpaw) of the Mummy Guard and keeping the rear hand (right for an orthodox fighter and left for a southpaw) in the cross block. It is named the Dracula Guard as it resembles Dracula hiding behind a cape.

With the Dracula Guard the lead hand is used for blocking the opponent's vision, distance control, parries, hand traps and framing. The rear hand is still available for power punching and passive defense against straight punches, uppercuts and hooks.

The Dracula Guard, however, makes powerful lead hooks and lead uppercuts more difficult as the lead arm must be brought back first to strike. This also telegraphs these punches making it easier for opponents to evade them. The Dracula Guard also leaves the lead side of the body exposed. Opponents also know how long your reach is and can gauge distance. These disadvantages can often be ameliorated by switching between the Dracula Guard and other guards.

== Origins ==
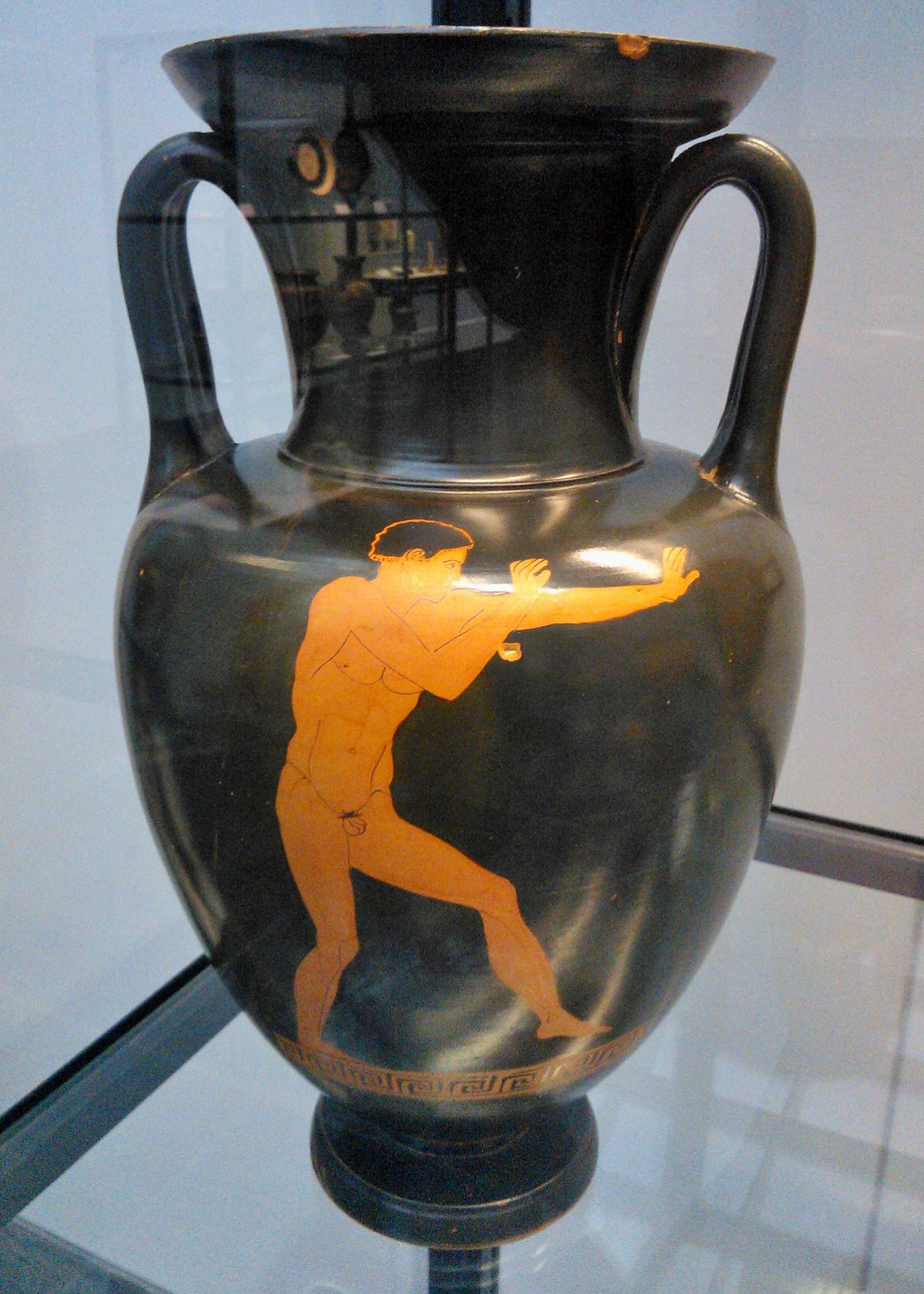
Pankratiast in fighting stance, Ancient Greek red-figure amphora, 440 BC

The origin of the Long Guards are unknown. Yet, the Long Guards are some of the oldest known guards and can be found in depictions of Ancient Greek boxing. Ancient Greek pottery often depicts both boxers and Pankratiasts as using variations of the long guard such as the Mummy Guard and the Dracula Guard. The Modern Classic Long Guard, with the rear arm at a 90 degree or less angle with the hand pressed against the side of the face, is not seen depicted on ancient pottery or frescos until after the sphairai, or padded hand protection, was introduced.

== Muay Thai ==
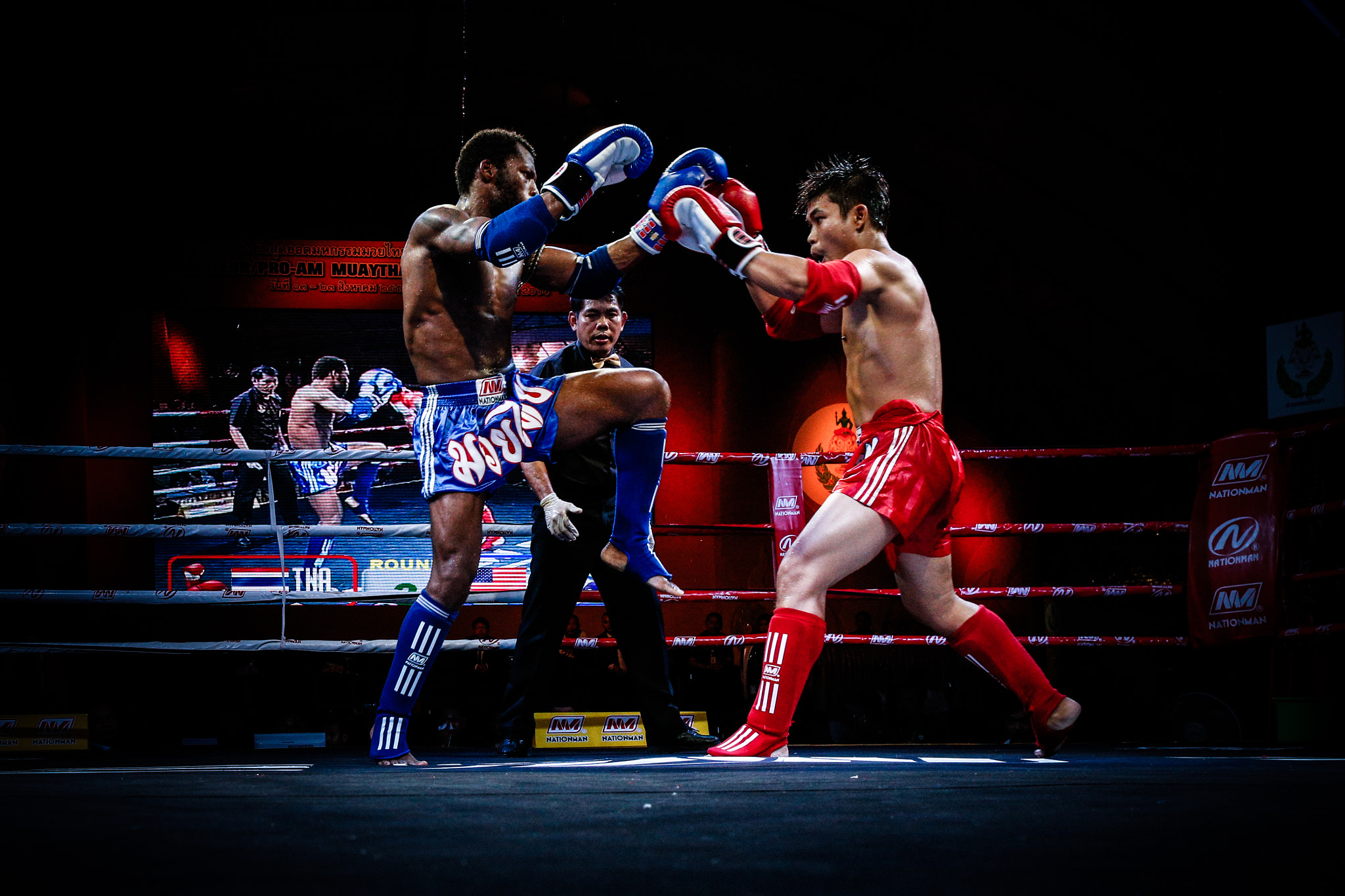
Muay Thai fighters using Mummy Guard

The Long Guards are also used in Muay Thai in many of the same ways they are used in boxing. The Mummy Guard, usually just called the long guard in Muay Thai, is used to protect against strikes, control distance, and set up counterattacks. The extended lead arm helps block strikes while the rear hand guards against body shots.

It is useful against aggressive opponents, allowing fighters to create space to fight in kicking range allowing them to use teeps and deflect punches. It is often combined with footwork like the reverse shuffle to maintain distance and avoid attacks. It can also be used to initiate a clinch to use elbows and knee strikes. By trapping an opponent's arms or pulling them down, fighters can open opportunities for hooks, uppercuts, and sweeps.

The Classic Long Guard is also used to create distance to fight in kicking range or initiate the clinch. It useful against hooks, but is less effective against straight punches and uppercuts.

The Dracula Guard protects against elbows and uppercuts. It is useful against aggressive opponents and helps defend against punches and elbows. It allows fighters to counterattack, such as with rear knee strikes or leg sweeps, while maintaining defense. However, it leaves openings for kicks to the body and legs, so fighters must adapt by checking or evading.

The Dracula Guard has been used by Muay Thai fighters such as Dieselnoi

== Mixed martial arts ==
Pankration is a precursor to mixed martial arts and has a similar rule set. The Long Guards have all the advantages and disadvantages they have in boxing and Muay Thai, but also have unique advantages and disadvantages. In mixed martial arts the Long Guards can be used to initiate a clinch which can not only be used to knee and elbow like in Muay Thai, but can also be used to set up wrestling entries.

By reaching over the opponent's lead shoulder, a Long Guard can transition into a collar tie, which is advantageous for clinch control and takedowns. The disadvantage is that because the arms are extended it is easier for an opponent to initiate their own clinch by grabbing the outstretched arms. The outstretched arms can be used to stop an opponent from shooting for a takedown, but can also help an opponent shooting for a takedown because the hands are held high allowing an opponent to level change under the extended arms and shoot for the legs.

Long Guards have been used by mixed martial arts fighters such as Daniel Cormier. and Ben Rothwell.
