= Age-uke =

Blocking technique in Karate

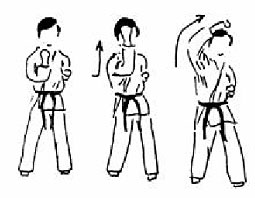
- A diagram of the performance of age uke

Japanese name
- Kanji: 上げ受け
- Hiragana: あげうけ
Transcriptions
- Revised Hepburn: Age uke

Age-uke (上げ受け), which translates to "rising block", or "upward block" is the Japanese term for a technique used in martial arts. There numerous variations in how the technique might be executed, and nothing implicit in the term itself restricts its use to unarmed techniques. It is commonly used with regards to the Karate technique that goes by that name, but can also refer to similar techniques in Kobudo.

Age-uke may be used to stiffly block or deflect an incoming high attack. Alternately, it may be used to receive an incoming attack, sweeping it overhead while maintaining contact with the attacking instrument (limb or weapon).

The term age-uke is frequently used interchangeably with "jōdan-uke" (high-level block). Whether these terms refer to two distinct techniques, or the same technique, depends entirely upon how each is used within any given martial arts school. However, the terms are distinct in that age comes from the verb ageru, meaning upward, and implying direction and/or motion. In the martial arts, the noun jōdan refers specifically to a target area of the body, including the shoulders and above. Since the term "age-uke" refers to blocks with an upward motion, there are many techniques called "age-uke" that can also be called "jōdan-uke", but some techniques are aimed at the center level, and are referred to as chūdan-uke.

== Description ==
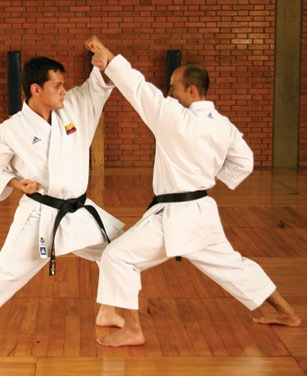
Karateka (left) using Age-uke

Age-uke in Karate is executed by bringing the arm up across the front of the body, and rotating the forearm so that it faces away from the forehead. The blocking motion occurs while the forearm rises, pressing or sweeping aside the attack against which it is guarding. Different styles of Karate perform this block with either an open hand or closed fist, but the closed fist is the most common in Karate Kata. Other variations of this technique include using the wrist or the hand itself to block.

Age-uke in Kobudo varies based on what weapon is being used. When using the Sai or the Tonfa, age-uke looks similar to how it appears in Karate, with the weapon pressed along the forearm of the blocking arm to reinforce the technique. The term can also be applied to a blocking technique with the Bo.

== See also ==
- Karate techniques
- List of shotokan techniques
