= Punch (combat) =

Striking blow with the closed fist

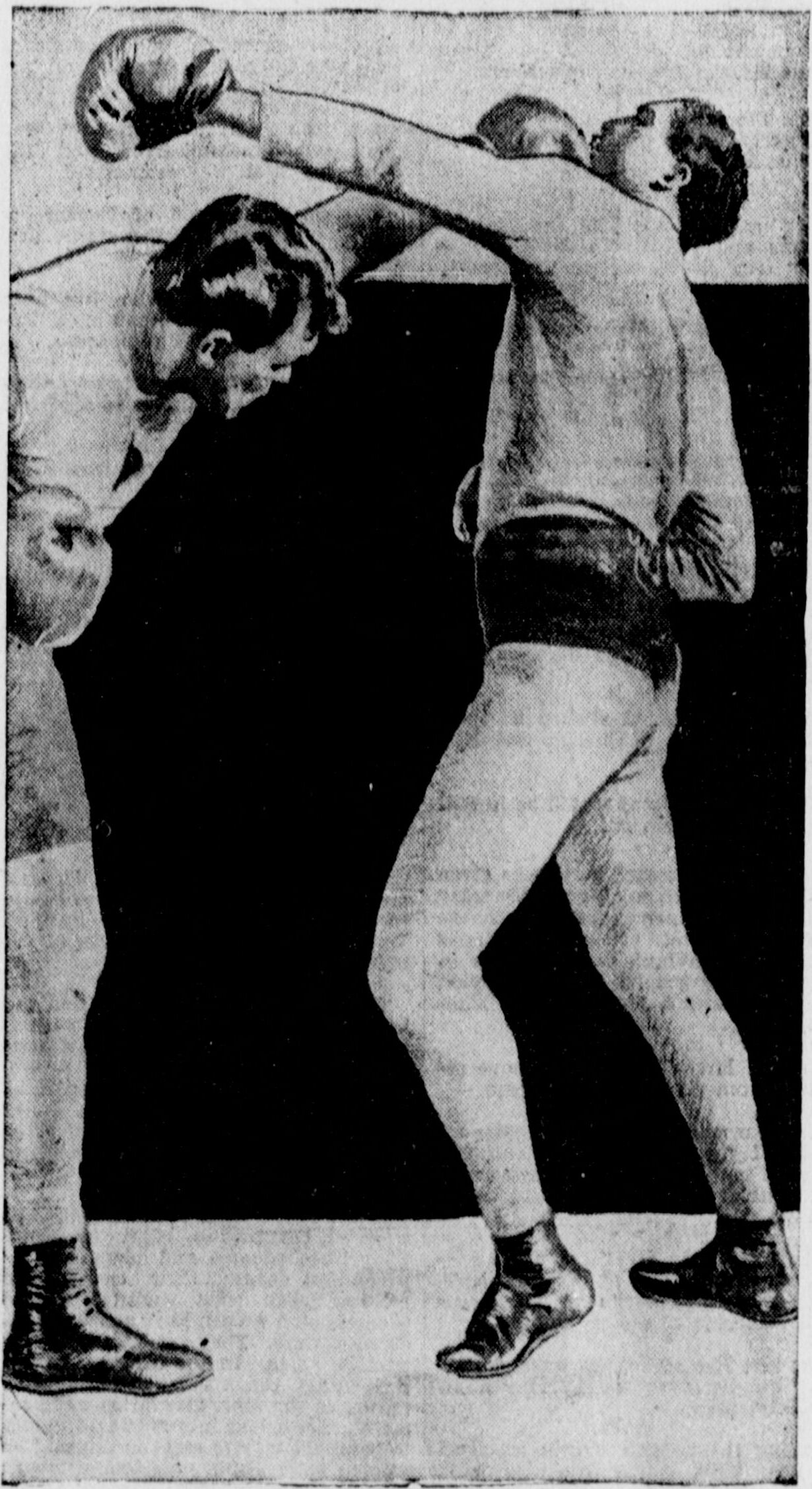
A jab by a boxer preparing for a championship fight

A punch is a striking blow with the fist. It is used in most martial arts and combat sports, most notably western boxing, where it is the only type of offensive technique allowed. In sports, hand wraps or other padding such as gloves may be used to protect athletes and practitioners from injuring themselves.

The use of punches varies between different martial arts and combat sports. Styles such as western boxing, Suntukan or Russian fist fighting use punches alone, while others such as kickboxing, Muay Thai, Lethwei or karate may use both punches and kicks. Others such as wrestling (excluding professional wrestling) and judo (punches and other striking techniques, atemi, are present in judo kata, but are forbidden in competitions) do not use punches at all. There are many types of punches and as a result, different styles encompass varying types of punching techniques.

== Basic types ==
This is not a comprehensive list of all punches and may need to be updated, due to the large diversity of schools of practice whose techniques, employing arm, shoulder, hip and leg work, may invariably differ.

Name	Description
Backfist	A backfist is performed by forming a fist and striking with the backside of the fist. A spinning backfist is performed when the attacker swivels 360 degrees before landing the punch, adding extra momentum to the attack. The fighter will lunge and begin spinning toward the side of the opponent of which fist they will attack with. Simpler terms, go to the left, spin to the left and connect with the left fist and vice versa.
Casting Punch	This is a punch used in Sambo and MMA that starts with a forward motion of the shoulders, which causes the bent arm to whip forward to the opponent. This punch can often cause the opponent to be put in a clinch if it misses at close range. Due to its purported origin, it is known as "Russian hook" in Japan.
Chain Punch	A punching attack primarily associated with Wing Chun, where one delivers punches rapidly from close range.
Chambered Punch	A strike commonly performed in karate, kung fu, and tae kwon do, originating from a "chambered" position.
Cross or straight	A direct straight punch similar to the jab, except delivered with the rear hand. Power is generated through the rotation of the hips.
Double Axe Handle	A punch where one puts both their hands together in a fist and then swings them in a motion similar to swinging in axe. Considered a highly ineffective and non-lethal punch, but is still occasionally seen in Professional Wrestling.
Hammer Fist	A compacted fist is brought down upon the target, usually using the outside area of the fist.
Haymaker	A punch in which the arm is whipped sideways from the shoulder joint with minimal elbow bend. The name is derived from the motion, which mimics the action of manually cutting hay by swinging a scythe. The haymaker is considered an imperfect/impure punch, as the angle of approach is unsupported by the remainder of the forearm. Since a haymaker's power is derived completely from weight transfer and momentum instead of muscle contraction, a long windup is required to generate sufficient force. Haymakers, in the form of shoulder punches, are frequently used from a mounted position in mixed martial arts as part of the "ground and pound" method, as the legs cannot be used to generate power. When thrown from standing, these punches leave the person vulnerable to a counter punch during the wind up, if blocked, or if the haymaker misses. Haymaker is generally considered a street or barfighter's punch, as it is the punch a person is most likely to use if they have not practiced martial arts and has little to no advantages over other punches such as the somewhat similar hook, making its use by trained martial artists rare.
Hook	A punch involving the use of turning to aim toward the side of the head or body. This punch must land using the knuckles and not from a flat fist. The hook is generally either thrown palm-down or palm-in.
Jab	The jab is a straight blow delivered (generally from a distance) with the arm above the lead foot ... The punch is quick and explosive. This punch must land from the very tips of the knuckles and not from a flat fist. " It is generally used for distraction, keeping distance, setting up, and defense.
Leopard Blow (Long Fist)	By tucking the fingertips against the bottom knuckle of each finger, a long fist is formed. They offer decreased strength but increased reach. The striking surface is also narrower, which allows the fist to dig between ribs and other soft target areas.
Lunge punch	A chambered punch where one steps in and delivers a punch from the same side as the leg that steps in. Though not particularly common in sparring, it is common in Karate and Taekwondo forms, where it is known as Oi-Tsuki (追い突き) and Bandae Jireugi (반대 지르기) respectively.
One-inch punch	A punch popularized by Bruce Lee, where one delivers a punch an inch away from the target, using the whole body to generate power.
Overhand punch	A semi-circular and vertical punch thrown with the rear hand. It is usually when the opponent is bobbing or slipping. The strategic utility of the drop relying on body weight can deliver a great deal of power. This punch must land from the very tips of the knuckles and not from a flat fist.
Reverse punch	Similar to a lunge punch but one punches with the hand opposite of the stepping leg. Known in Karate and Taekwondo as Gyaku-Tsuki (逆突き) and Baro Jireugi (바로 지르기) respectively.
Shovel hook	A close-range punch that is halfway between a hook and an uppercut. Shovel hooks are most commonly used to strike the body at a 45-degree angle. For example, a liver shot can be done using a shovel hook. This punch must land from the very tips of the knuckles and not from a flat fist.
Sucker punch	A punch that takes the enemy by surprise, possibly knocking them out, incapacitating them or severely injuring them. Could be an unexpected blow to the stomach or a strike from behind that the victim did not see coming.
Superman punch	A superman punch or diving punch is a technique used in Muay Thai, ITF-style Taekwon-Do, full contact karate and mixed martial arts fighting. The striker will lunge toward the opponent, pushing off with the back foot, punching with the opposite arm of the leg used to push off with although there may be variations in the name and technique, depending on the fighting style. The pose should resemble that of Superman flying through the air, hence the name.
Uppercut	The fist is raised vertically towards the target, usually the head or upper body. Since most guards are held with the arms in a vertical position, the uppercut can be used to avoid the opponent's attempts at blocking. This punch must land from the very tips of the knuckles and not from a flat fist.
Upset punch	Starts with the fist in the chambered position, with the palm facing downwards, delivered to the abdomen or solar plexus.

== Styles ==
A man being punched in the abdomen.

=== Boxing ===
In boxing, punches are classified according to the motion and direction of the strike; contact is always made with the knuckles. There are four primary punches in boxing: the jab, cross, hook, and uppercut.

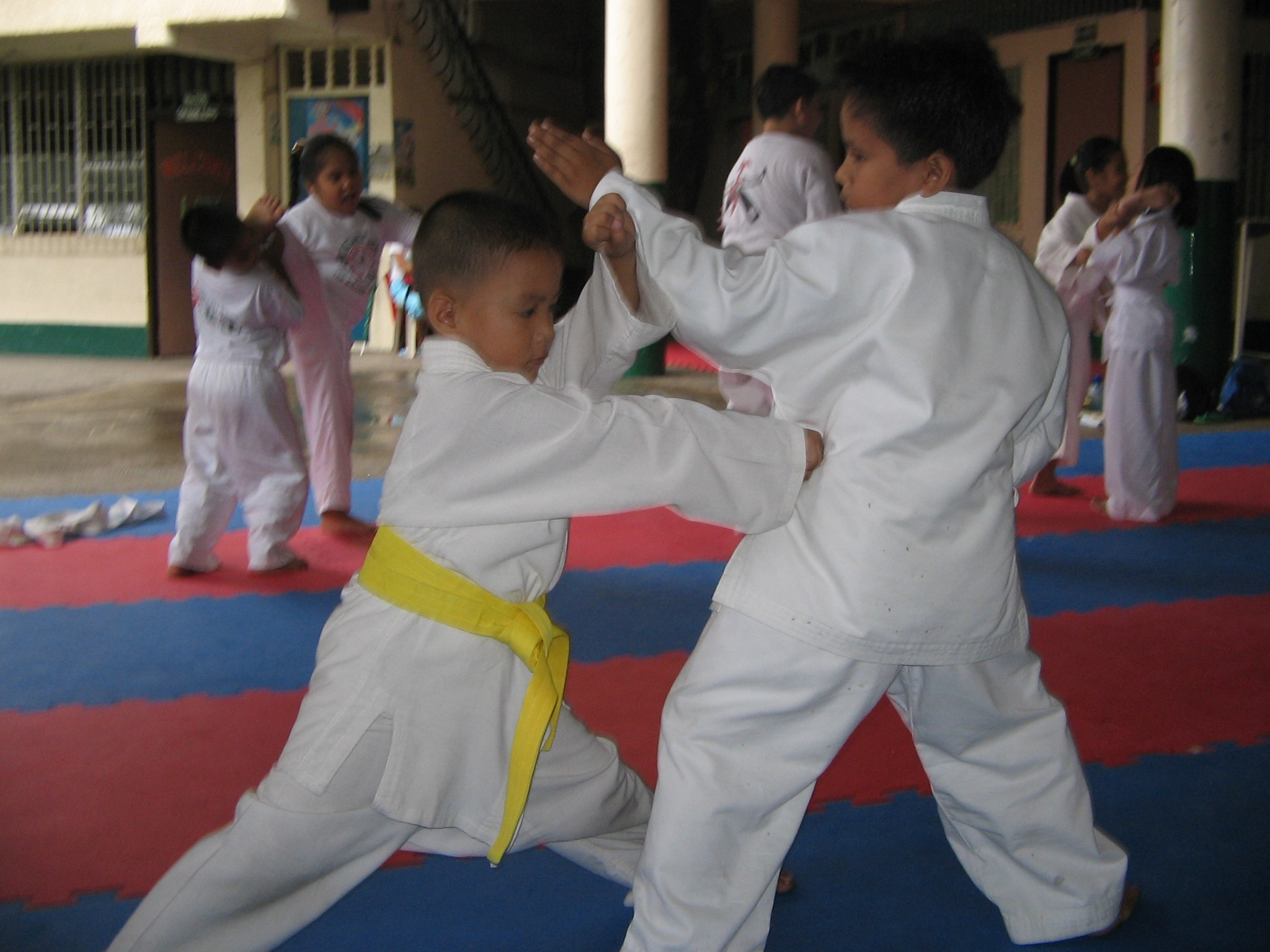
A karateka performing a 'reverse punch' or gyaku zuki being performed by two young boys.

=== Karate ===
Punching techniques in karate are called tsuki or zuki. Contact is made with the first two knuckles (seiken). If any other part of the hand is used to strike with, such as the back of the fist (uraken), then the blow is classified as a strike (uchi).

Karate punches include the thrust punch oi-zuki made using the lead-hand, straight punch choku-zuki, reverse punch gyaku-zuki, made from the opposite (lead) hand, and many other variations.

== Gallery ==
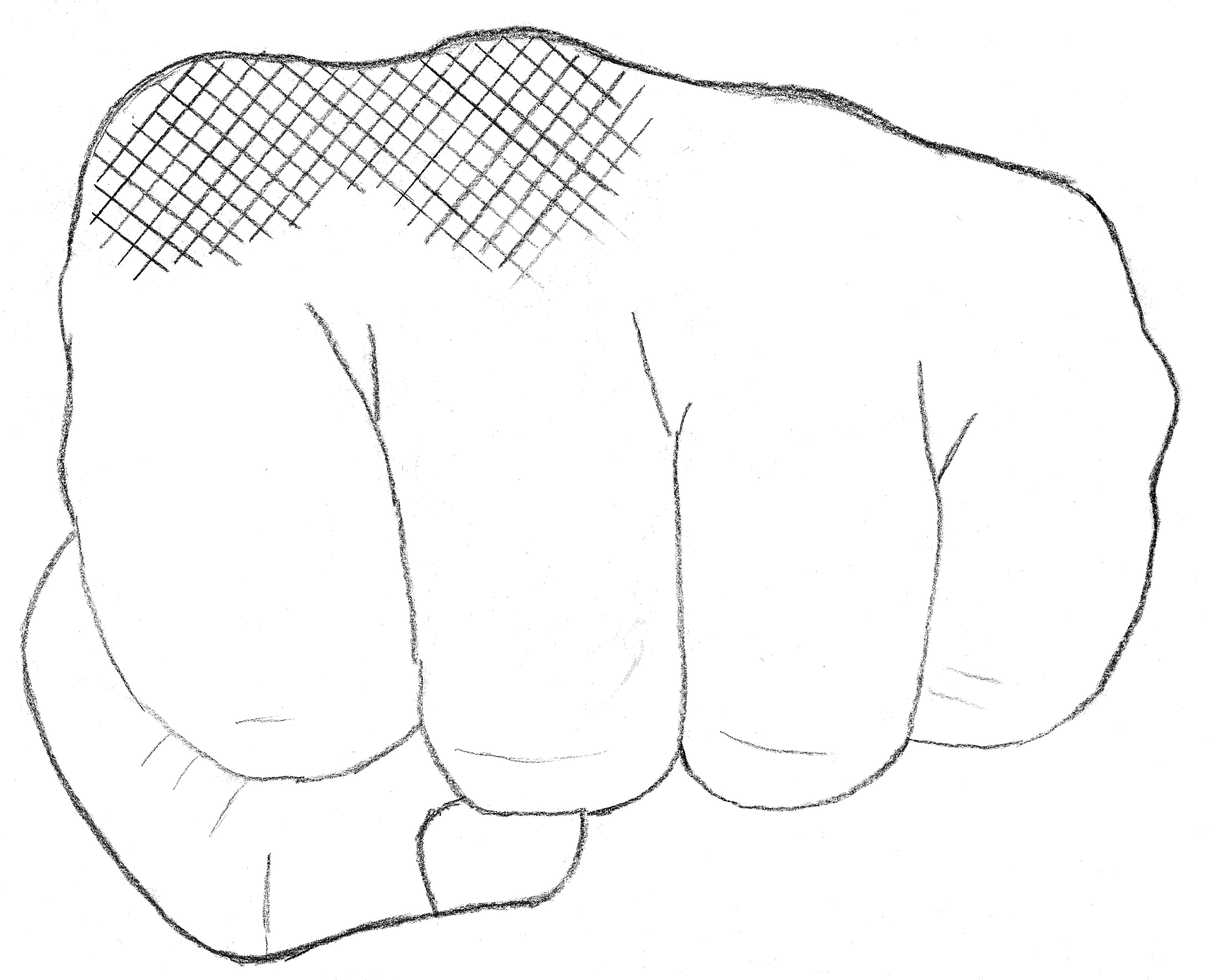
Seiken

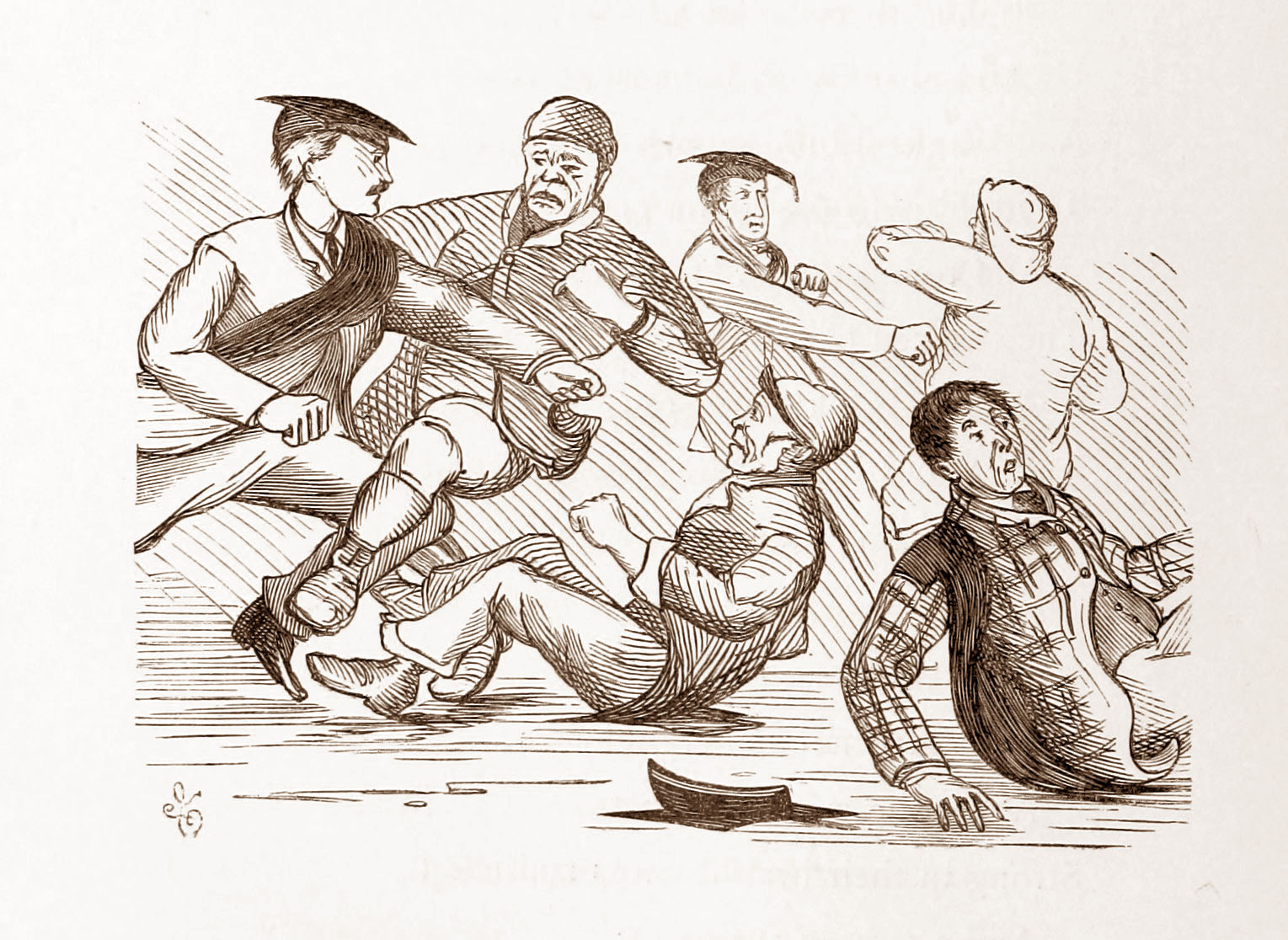
A brawl is a large scale fist fight

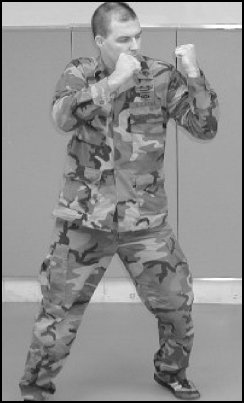
An American soldier demonstrating an uppercut
