= Hammerblow =

Martial arts technique

A hammerblow is a martial arts attack made with both hands interlocked at the fingers. The added weight and control (as opposed to a regular punch) allows for a slower, but more powerful strike. The attack is also more widely known as a double axe handle strike in Professional Wrestling.

To execute, one brings their palms together (slightly off-centre), locks the fingers downward, then swings at an opponent as if they were holding a club-weapon (like a bat). The technique is generally agreed upon as ineffective by most combat sports professionals, but remains a popular move in media and fight choreography due to the perceived power of the technique and ease of framing. It is most famous for its usage in Star Trek where Captain Kirk famously used the technique against the Gorn. It has also appeared in other popular media such as Dragon Ball and Final Fantasy VII.
