= Mariam Farid =

Mariam Farid may refer to:

- Mariam Mamdouh Farid (born 1998), Qatari athlete
- Mariam Farid (kickboxer), Australian kickboxer
