= Women's kickboxing =

Combat sport

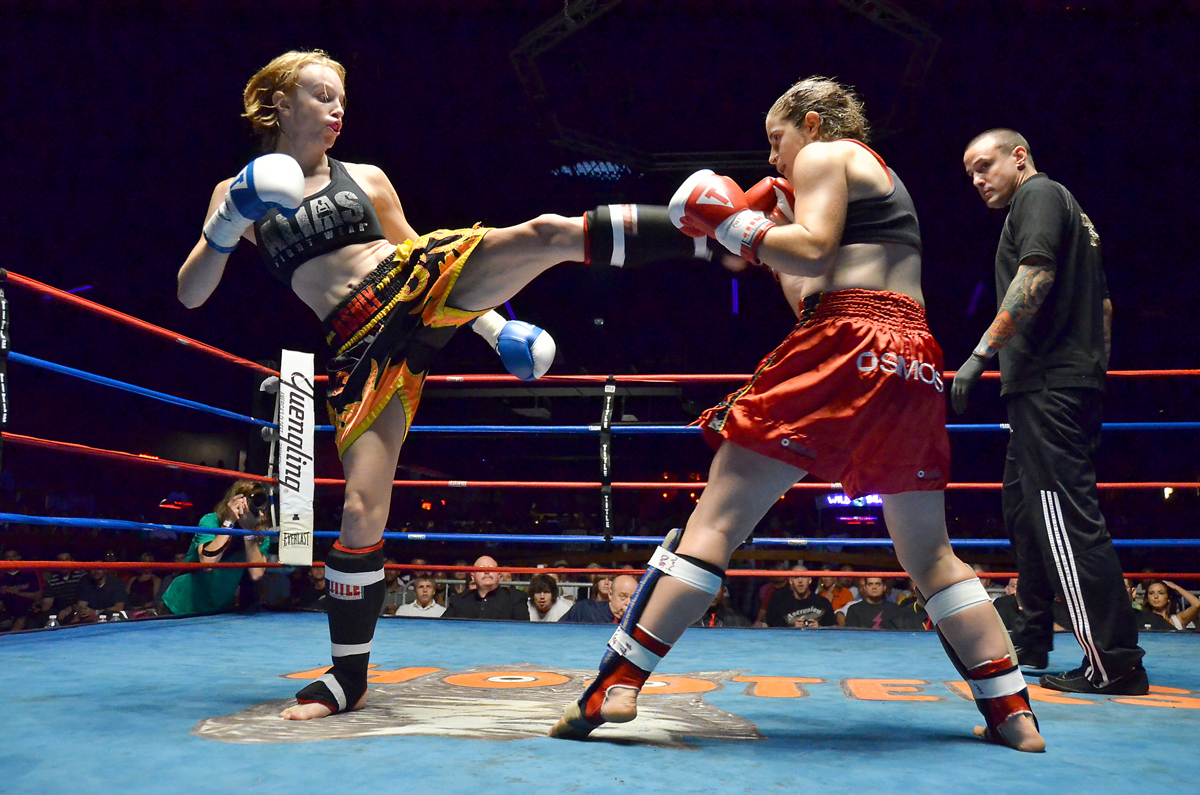
- Focus: Striking
- Hardness: Full-contact
- Famous practitioners: see list of female kickboxers
- Parenthood: Karate, Muay Thai, Boxing
- Descendant arts: Shoot boxing

Women have participated in kickboxing since the 1960s in Thailand. But there has been a superstition and prejudice women have often being prevented from participating in the major tournaments in Thailand.

The World’s Muay Thai Angels is one of the first organisations to be a place for women to participate in and the first tournament was won by Chommanee Sor Taehiran.

Women's kickboxing in Australia has a small but devoted following. In the 1970s women in the United States took up kickboxing as they were prevented from taking part in women's boxing. In the UK kickboxing has a growing following according to the WMC.

In May 2016 the kickboxing organisation Glory announced the creation of a women's division built around Tiffany van Soest.

In 2021 the Lumpinee Boxing Stadium finally allowed women to compete in Muay Thai.

== In popular culture ==
In Stieg Larsson's book The Girl Who Played with Fire (2006) and its film adaptation, Lisbeth Salander, her friend and lover Miriam Wu, and their friend Paolo are kickboxers. Lisbeth adopted her kickboxing ringname, "The Wasp", as her hacker handle and has a wasp tattoo on her neck.

== See also ==
- List of female kickboxers
- Women's kickboxing in Australia

== Bibliography ==
- Global Perspectives on Women in Combat Sports:Women Warriors around the World, Alex Channon, Palgrave Macmillan, August 2015, ISBN 9781137439352
