= Women's kickboxing in Australia =

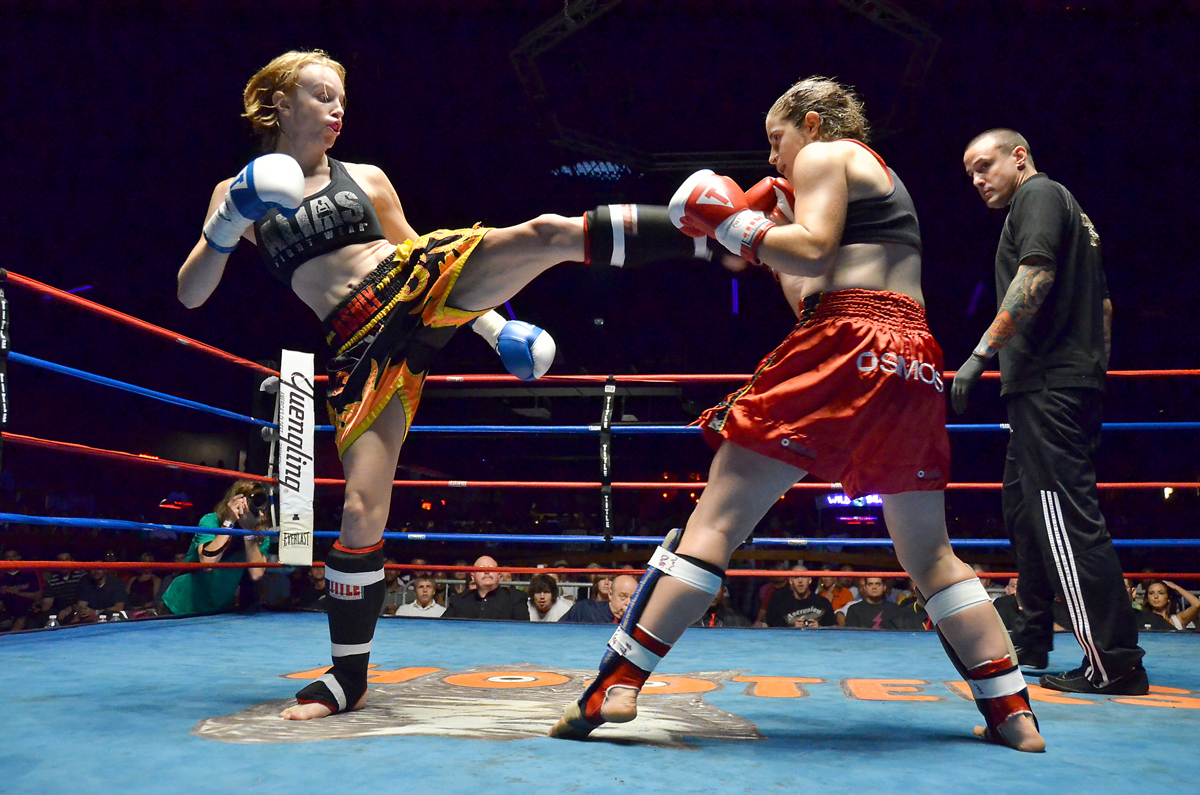
- A women's kickboxing competition
- Country: Australia
- National team: Australia

Women's kickboxing in Australia is not popular when compared to men's participation in the sport. Women have faced legal challenges in participating in New South Wales, which outlawed their participation in the ring. The sport has been embraced by Muslim women, who can be fully clothed while participating.

== Statistics ==
In 2010, less than 1% of all Muay Thai kickboxers were female.

== History ==
In 1985, Neville Wran, the New South Wales Premier, tried to ban a women's kickboxing event from taking place in the state. He said that "women punching and kicking each other is not acceptable to the community.' He sought assistance from the state's Minister of Sport, Mike Cleary, to block the contest. The Boxing and Wrestling and Control Act 1986 was amended in order to prevent women from competing in New South Wales. Specifically, section 62D of the act refers to women. Minister for Sport Michael Cleary said before the New South Wales parliament "The spectacle of women attacking each other" was wrong and that female fighters risked "becoming freaks in some sort of Roman circus disguised as a sporting contest." Holly Ferneley challenged the constitutionality of the ban, citing section 42 of the Sex Discrimination Act in Australia's federal courts. Ferneley lost because the justice, Murray Wilson, ruled she lacked standing as she was not a registered kickboxer because she is disqualified from registering because of her gender. The first woman in New South Wales to be banned from the sport was Penny Gulliver.

During the 1980s and 1990s, women's kickboxing saw a large expansion in the number of competitors. In 1990, the Women World Muay Thai tournament was first held; Lucy Tui represented Australia at the inaugural event. In 1994, at the WMTA, Australia had only one representative, Lucy Tui, who was the only woman at the event. Because of the ban on women's participation in kickboxing in New South Wales, Lucy Tui became a judge in the sport. In 2001, while competing in a Christchurch tournament, Tricia Devellerez was injured and needed to be induced into a coma. In 2008, the sport became legal again in New South Wales. It was reported in 2008 that South Australia saw a rise in female participation in exercise. According to Adelaide Now, Office for Recreation and Sport executive director Paul Anderson "said the reason women were outstripping men was likely because of the introduction of more "fun" options at gyms, such as spin classes and kickboxing."

The International Sport Kickboxing Association-ISKA world cup tournament was held in 2005 in Sydney. Women fighters competed, with a pair coming from Papua New Guinea. In 2007, the Kokoda Track cup was held in order to develop a stronger relationship between kickboxers in Papua-New Guinea and Australia. Papua-New Guinea sent female fighters to compete against the Australians.

== Media coverage ==
Melita Carnarvas is an Australian female kickboxer. The media has intentionally tried to portray her as "the glamour girl of Australian kickboxing", to further an image of the sport being heteronormative within Australia's sporting culture. The Australian media has done similar heteronormative coverage for the American kickboxing champion, Kathy Long.

== Minority participation ==
Kickboxing has become a popular sport for Muslim women in the Australia. Part of the reason for this is Muslim women are allowed to compete while fully clothed which does not conflict with the religious beliefs of the sport's participants. Mariam Farid is a Muslim woman from Sydney. She specialises in Muay Thai kickboxing. As an amateur kickboxer, she has won three bouts. She has faced criticism from the Muslim community following media coverage of her participation, but she also has received support on places like Facebook.

Kickboxing courses are offered in Australia for members of the LGBT community.

== Notable Women fighters ==
- Holly Ferneley – an Australian professional female kickboxer.
- Stephanie Curtiss – lost to American Bridgett "Baby Doll" Riley with a 7-round points loss.
- Sharon "Wild Thing" Anyos – Australian female kickboxer. In 1989, she won the WAKO Australian Kickboxing Lightweight title, in the process scoring victories over Nadine McDonald and Narelle Rockall. She also defeated Holly Ferneley by unanimous decision.
- Penny Gulliver – is a former Australian women's kickboxing champion.
- Kim-Alina Ross – is a Traralgon kickboxer, who won her first match in 50 seconds with a knockout win over Angela Clark, just forty people attended the match. Her trainer described this win as a positive step towards encouraging more women to participate in the sport locally.
- Bec Hyatt – The best known Australian female mixed martial artist started her career with kickboxing before transitioning into MMA .

== Bibliography ==
- Stell, Marion K. (1991). Half the Race, A history of Australian women in sport. North Ryde, Australia: HarperCollins. ISBN 0-207-16971-3.
