= Overhand punch =

Punch in boxing

Overhand (overcut)
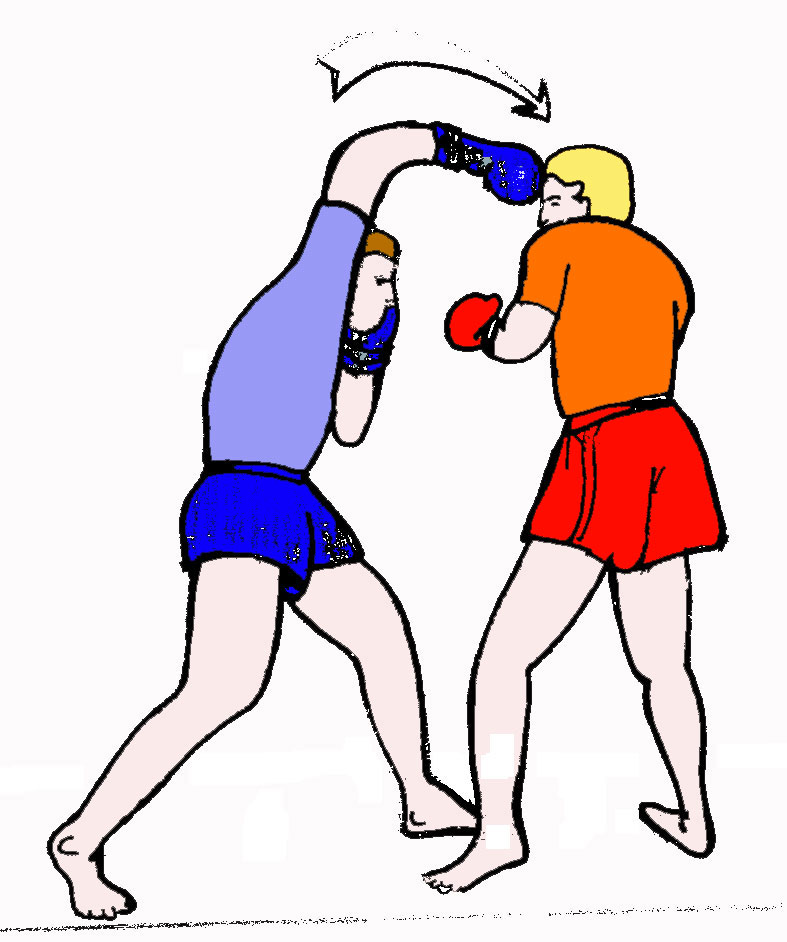
- Right overhand in medium range
- Also known as: France: Coup de poing descendant China: 超手摆拳 Thailand: Mat kro (หมัดฮุก) (Serbia) Serbian: прекоручни
- Focus: Striking

An overhand (or overcut or drop) punch is a semi-circular and vertical punch thrown with the lead or rear hand. It is designed to go over the opponent's lead hand or jab to hit their head. The overhand is a versatile counter-punch used to surprise an opponent, land a knockout blow, or as part of a setup for other combinations. It's executed by driving off the back leg, dropping the body and head to the side, and using a looping motion to arc the arm downwards onto the target. The strategic utility of the drop relying on body weight can deliver a great deal of power. It can also be employed when the opponent is bobbing or slipping.

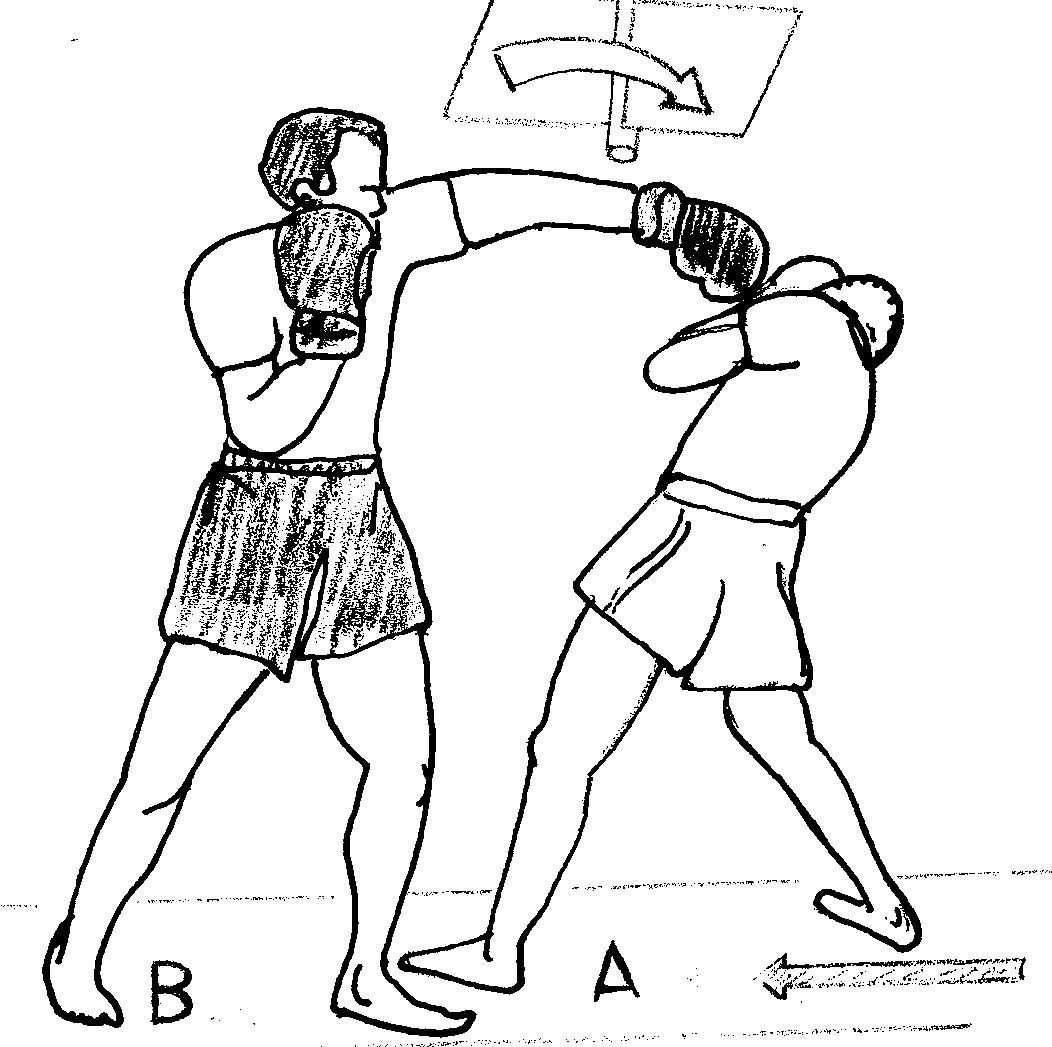
Left overhand in long range

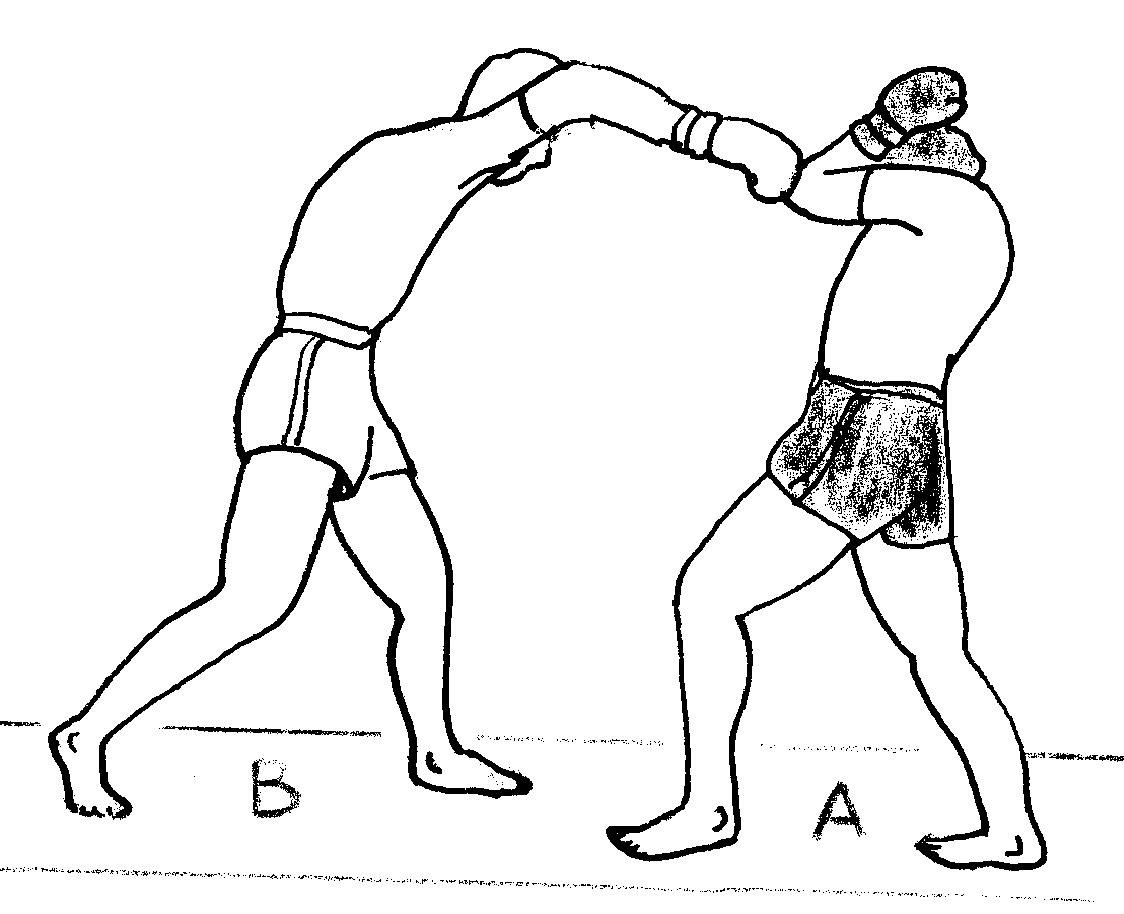
Right overhand in long range

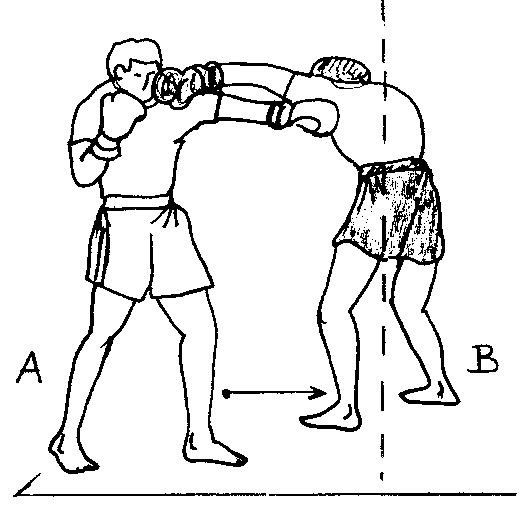
Left overhand in long range and counterpunch

== Mechanics ==
The rear overhand punch is a powerful, looping strike designed to go "over" an opponent's guard. The mechanics are similar to throwing a baseball. It involves a coordinated step, weight transfer, and footwork for balance. Your front foot steps forward and slightly to the left (for an orthodox stance), mirroring the arc of the punch. As you step, shift your weight onto your front leg to put your full body weight behind the punch. The stepping motion naturally creates the arcing path of the punch, helping it circle around your opponent's guard.

If the fighter is in a bladed stance the back foot stays in place, maintaining a wide base. This allows the fighter to fall back easily after throwing. This leaves the fighter open to counters so they must roll out to the right after landing to avoid a counter-punch. From a squared stance the back foot is brought forward to follow the step as this generates more twisting power and keeps your feet squared under your body. It also provides better balance and makes it harder to knock you off-balance if countered.

== Setups and Counters ==
An overhand should be set up to be effective. Common setups include: Using a jab to preoccupy the opponent before looping the overhand over their guard. Feinting the overhand to gauge reactions before throwing it for real. Rolling under an opponent's hook and coming up with the overhand. Using a hand trap in a closed stance by grabbing the opponent's lead hand and pulling it down while throwing the rear overhand punch. Throwing a jab to the body, or feinting a jab to the body, then throwing the overhand. In Mixed martial arts, faking a level change as if going for a takedown and then throwing the overhand.

The overhand can also be used as a counterpunch in response to your opponent's actions. It can be used to punish a weak or predictable jab by throwing the overhand over the jab. It can also be used when an opponent lowers their lead hand.

== Defense and Counters ==
Defense relies on distance, angles, positioning and anticipation. A fighter should maintain a good stance, use their lead hand for protection, study their opponent's habits to anticipate the punch, and always look to counter after defending, as the attacker is most vulnerable immediately after throwing it.

Some options for an orthodox closed stance against rear overhand include:

- Dodge and Counter — Lean or step back just enough for the punch to miss. This exposes the attacker's right side, allowing for counters like a jab-cross or hook-cross combination.
- Wedge block — almost straighten your lead arm and angle it out to intercept the circular punch. You can then wrap the arm to tie up the opponent.
- Helmet cover — Raise your lead glove high to block the shot next to your ear (like answering a phone), keeping your chin tucked. Be aware that covering can still cause impact damage.
- Slip or Duck and Counter — Time the punch, bend your knees, and slip your head to the outside (left for an orthodox right), creating an opening for a left hook to the body.
- Duck and Hook — Duck under the punch and move inside on your opponent, then counter with a left hook to the head or body.
- Shoulder roll and Cross — Shoulder roll and fade back then counter with the cross.
- Roundhouse Kick — Time a left roundhouse kick to the exposed right side of the body as the punch is thrown.
- Takedown — As the opponent drives forward with the committed punch, change levels to avoid it and shoot for a takedown against their compromised balance.
