= Gyaku-zuki =

Karate and aikido technique

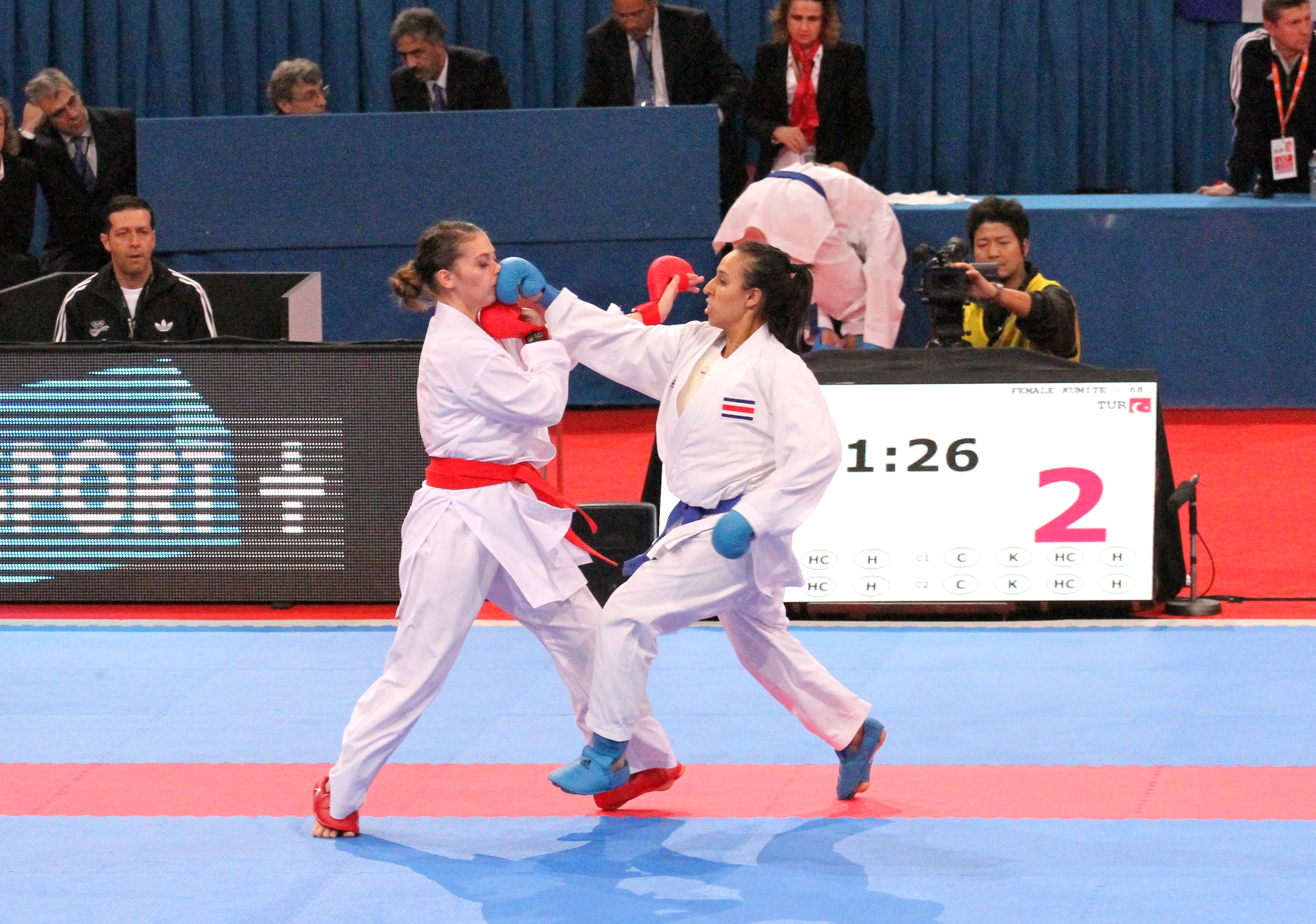

Japanese name
- Kanji: 逆突き
- Hiragana: ぎゃくづき
Transcriptions
- Revised Hepburn: gyaku-zuki

The gyaku-zuki (Japanese: 逆突き, pronounced [ɡjakɯzɯki]) is an attack technique often also referred to as a reverse punch. This is used in many budō disciplines, e.g. in karate or aikidō. This is an embodiment of the choku-zuki (straight punch forward).

After a step forward from the zenkutsu-dachi position, a straight forward punch is made for each forward leg (chūdan or jōdan), with the hip twisted in, or the hip rotation supporting the impact. The gyaku-zuki is the counterpart to the oi-zuki, in which the impact is made to be the same in relation to the front leg. While the oi-zuki is used as an attacking technique and with a full step forward, the gyaku-zuki is a counterattack that is used in a standing position, without a full step forward.

Also common are the two variants of performing the crotch and kick simultaneously, or supporting the thrust (without crotch) by simultaneously sliding the entire body and legs forward.

Example: In the left display, the execution of a gyaku-zuki is done by the karateka doing a kick with the right fist.

== Literature ==
- Werner Lind: Lexikon der Kampfkünste. China, Japan, Okinawa, Korea, Vietnam, Thailand, Burma, Indonesien, Indien, Mongolei, Philippinen, Taiwan u. a. Sportverlag, Berlin 1999, ISBN 3-328-00838-1, (Edition BSK).
