= Oi-zuki =

Martial arts technique

Japanese name
- Kanji: 追い突き
- Hiragana: おいつき

An oi-zuki Japanese pronunciation: [oiˌzɯki] (Japanese: 追い突き), known in Wadō-Ryū as jun-zuki (Japanese: 順突き), is an equal-sided punch used in budo disciplines such as karate or jujitsu.

This is an embodiment of the choku-zuki with foot movement. In addition to the block techniques, the Oi-Zuki is one of the first techniques a student learns. The oi-zuki is the counterpart to the gyaku-zuki (fist punch with the side whose leg is not straight at the front).

Due to the long movement, the oi-zuki is rarely used in competition. It is mainly found in katas and elementary school techniques.
