= Bobbing (boxing) =

Defensive strategy in boxing

Bobbing is one of the basic strategies of defensive boxing, executed by slightly moving the head to either side so that the opponent's punches slip by the boxer's head. The slip is used to evade swings, jabs, and straight punches. It can not be used with hooks as they move on the side level. Using slips is valid but risky with uppercuts since the punch is usually too close when the defender can determine the exact line of the punch. To overcome the hooks problem, the defender usually incorporate slipping (also called weaving) with ducking (also called bobbing)

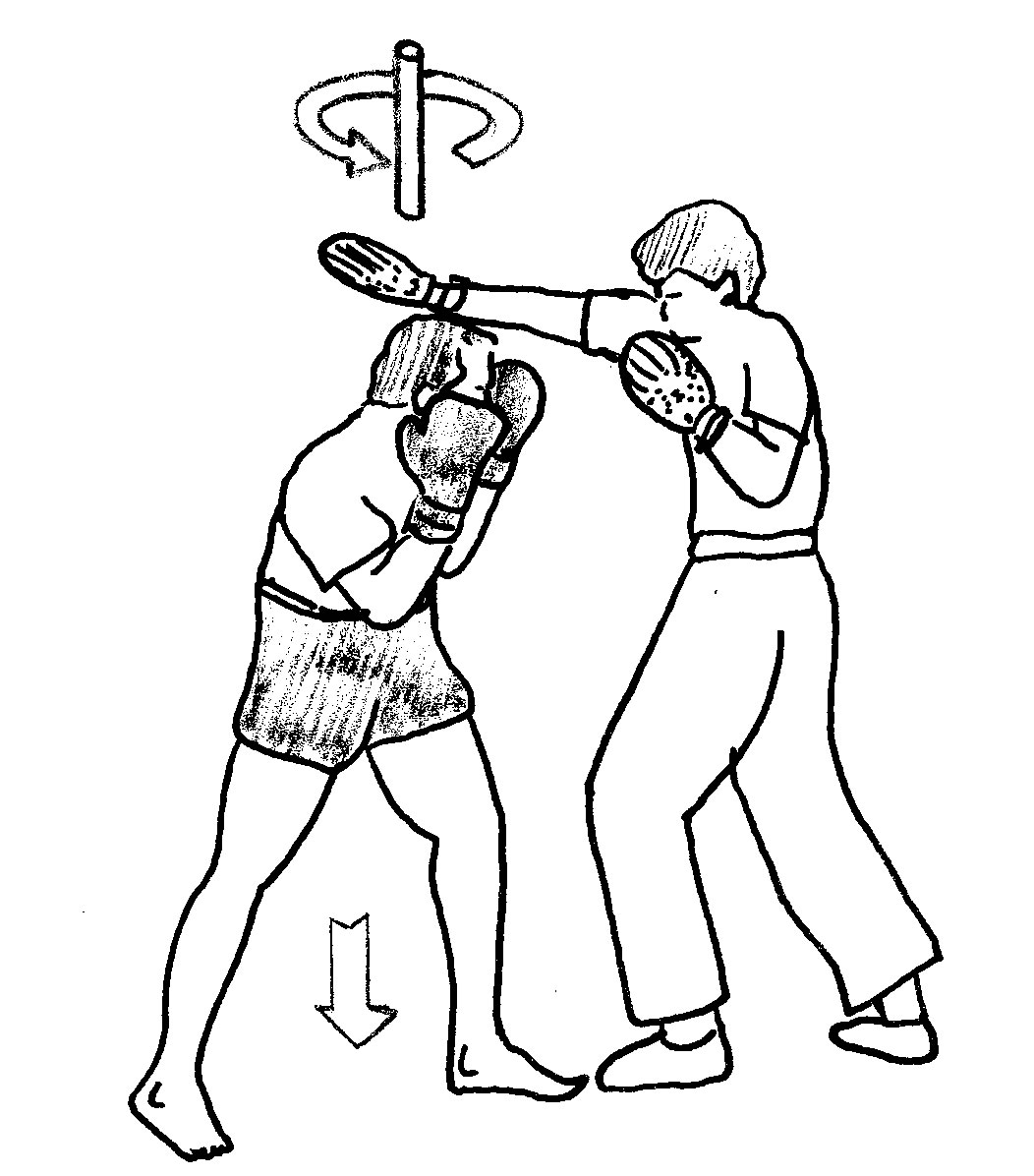

== Famous bobbing boxers ==
- Joe Frazier
- Mike Tyson
- Jack Dempsey
