= Shovel hook =

Martial arts punch

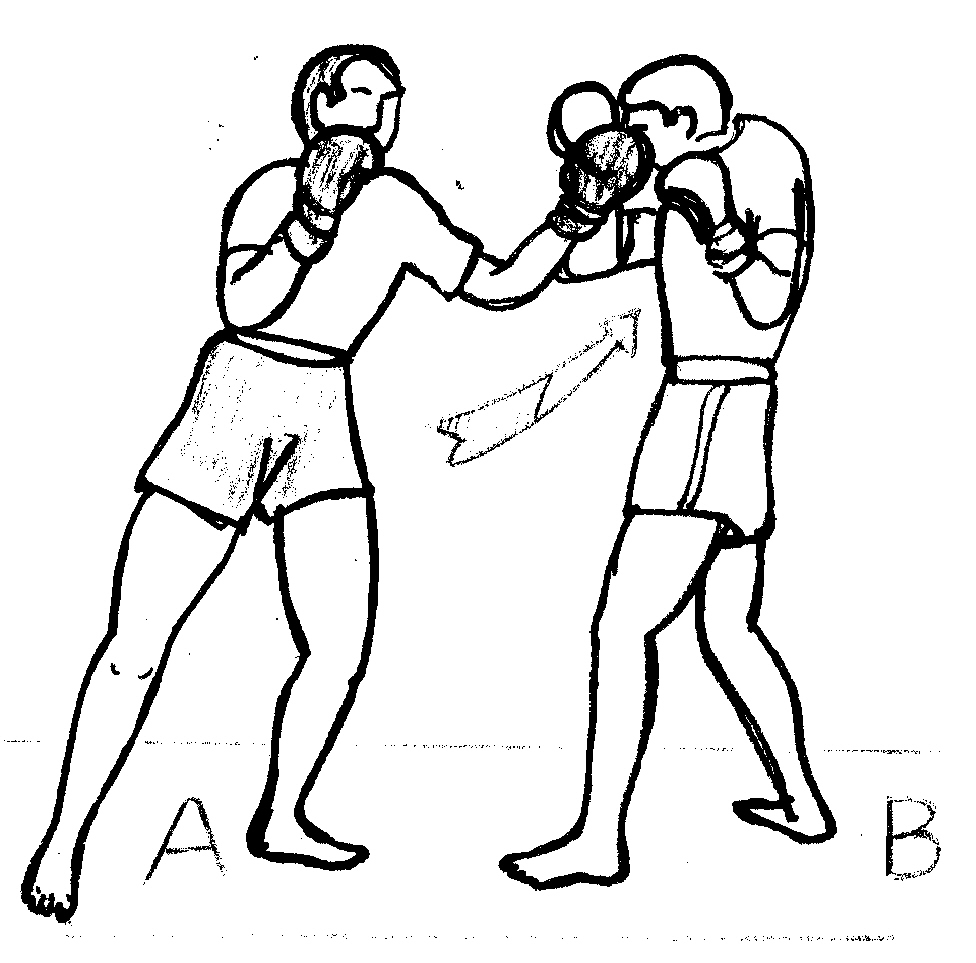
- Boxer (left) using a shovel hook

The shovel hook is a sophisticated and powerful hybrid punch, occupying a unique middle ground between boxing's fundamental blows. It combines the horizontal torso rotation of a hook with the vertical, rising trajectory of an uppercut. This results in a punch that travels on a sharp, compact diagonal arc, moving forward and upward toward the target. Unlike a wide, sweeping hook, the shovel hook is a tighter, more concentrated punch, often described as a "digging" or "lifting" motion designed to deliver force underneath an opponent's defensive shell.

The primary anatomical target of the shovel hook is the solar plexus, jaw, or the liver. Its upward angle is engineered to slip under the elbow and connect with the soft tissue beneath the rigid structure of the rib cage. When thrown to the liver—located on the right side of the body—the punch's upward drive compresses the organ against the diaphragm, rib cage and spine, maximizing the traumatic impact. This strategic targeting of vulnerable organs is what gives the shovel hook its fight-ending potential, as it can trigger an overwhelming physiological shutdown via the vagus nerve.

Executing a shovel hook with power requires a precise and coordinated kinetic chain. The punch begins from a stable, athletic stance, often with the knees slightly bent to facilitate the upward drive. Power initiation starts from the ground, with the legs driving upward. This leg drive is seamlessly coupled with a sharp, explosive rotation of the hips and core torso. The arm acts not as a primary power source but as a solid conduit, channeling this generated force from the lower body through the fist.

The fist position and arm angle are critical technical details. The puncher's knuckles are typically held in a vertical or "thumb-up" position, which naturally aligns the wrist with the diagonal path of the punch and helps in targeting the soft midsection. The elbow remains tucked in at a moderate angle, neither flared out like a wide hook nor pinned to the body like a tight uppercut. This positioning creates the perfect leverage for the diagonal arc, ensuring structural integrity upon impact to prevent injury to the puncher's hand or wrist.

Due to its compact but committed motion, the shovel hook is inherently a close-range weapon. It is most effectively deployed in the pocket, where longer, straighter punches are less practical. This proximity, however, also presents a risk, as throwing the punch can expose the puncher's head to counters.

== Set-ups ==
A shovel hook is rarely thrown in isolation. It is most effectively set up by preceding attacks. Beyond single setups, the shovel hook integrates seamlessly into destructive punch combinations. The core principle across all setups is the high-low strategy: using punches aimed at the head to raise the opponent's guard, thereby exposing the torso for the fight-ending blow.

Common setups for an orthodox fighter in a closed stance include:

1. Left Hook to Head-Shovel Hook to Body. First establish a credible threat by throwing hard left hooks to your opponent's head. This conditions them to raise their guard high whenever they see the hook coming. Once this pattern is set, you feint or throw the same initial motion, but instead target the shovel hook to the now-unprotected liver. The setup doesn't have to be immediate. The goal is to get the opponent anticipating a headshot, making them complicit in creating their own vulnerability. The Gervonta Davis vs. Ryan Garcia fight is a classic example of this psychological and physical setup.

2. Jab-Shovel Hook. A jab to the head causes the opponent to react by bringing their hands forward to parry or block. This movement pulls their elbows away from their torso, creating the opening for the shovel hook. The critical technical point is to keep your eyes locked on your opponent's head/chest. Any glance down at the body will telegraph your intention. The punch should be a surprise, as demonstrated by Bernard Hopkins's knockout of Oscar De La Hoya, which was set up with a simple Jab-Shovel Hook.

3. Double Jab-Overhand-Shovel Hook. You throw a double jab to distract your opponent from the following overhand. The overhand can be a precursor to the shovel hook to the liver because of the downward motion used which loads up the left side for the liver shot.

4. Jab-Cross-Shovel Hook You throw several standard Jab-Cross (1-2) combinations at the head. This establishes a predictable pattern and keeps the opponent's guard high. You then fluidly add the shovel hook to the end of the combination, using the cross to step into the optimal range.

5. Jab-Cross-Lead Hook-Shovel Hook. The sequence starts with a Jab-Cross (1–2) to the head, forcing a high guard. You immediately follow with a Lead Hook to the head while simultaneously taking an outside step with your lead foot. This footwork angles you off to the side, lining up the shovel hook perfectly against the opponent's exposed liver, which becomes a "large target."

6. Jab-Rear Hook-Shovel Hook. You begin by throwing a few Jab-Rear Hook (1–4) combinations. The rear hook (a right hook for an orthodox fighter) is an unexpected head punch that can disrupt your opponent's guard and expectations. After establishing this pattern, you throw the full combo: a Jab to distract, the Rear Hook to make them shell up high on their left side, which exposes the right side of their body for the finishing shovel hook.

7. Right Hook-Left Shovel Hook. You throw a Right Hook to the head, which forces the opponent to focus their defense on that side. You then use the recoil and momentum from the right hook to immediately swing back with the Shovel Hook to the liver. The power of the first hook makes the opponent over-commit to defending their head, leaving them vulnerable.

8. Slipping a Right Hand. You deliberately draw out your opponent's cross (right hand) by leaning forward or jabbing at their gloves. As they throw the punch, you slip to the outside (to your left). This defensive move places you parallel to your opponent and in a loaded position, allowing you to counter with a shovel hook to the now-exposed liver as their punch misses.
