= Southpaw stance =

Hand-to-hand combat terminology

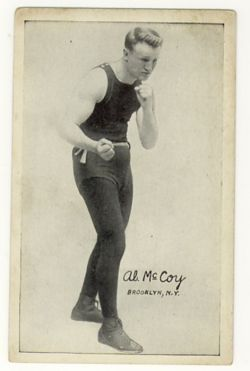
Al McCoy, world champion in the 1910s, displaying southpaw stance with right hand and right foot to the fore

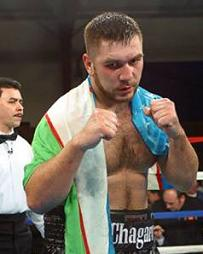
Ruslan Chagaev in southpaw stance

In boxing and some other sports, a southpaw stance is a stance in which the boxer has the right hand and the right foot forward, leading with right jabs, and following with a left cross right hook. It is the normal stance for a left-handed boxer. The corresponding boxing designation for a right-handed boxer is the orthodox stance, which is generally a mirror-image of the southpaw stance. In American English, "southpaw" generally refers to a person who is left-handed. While many advantages have been theorized for left-handedness in sports, many studies have found no impact at the professional level.

== Previous uses of the term southpaw ==
The "American Heritage Dictionary of the English Language" cites the conventional wisdom that the word "southpaw" originated "from the practice in baseball of arranging the diamond with the batter facing east to avoid the afternoon sun." Although some commentators claim that the term originated due to the orientation of baseball playing fields to keep the sun out of the batters' eyes, with the resulting alignment of a left-handed pitcher's throwing arm causing the pitcher to have his left hand on the south side of his body, the term had been since 1909 to indicate "not-usual".

== See also ==
- List of southpaw stance boxers
- Footedness
