= One-two combo =

Strategy in boxing

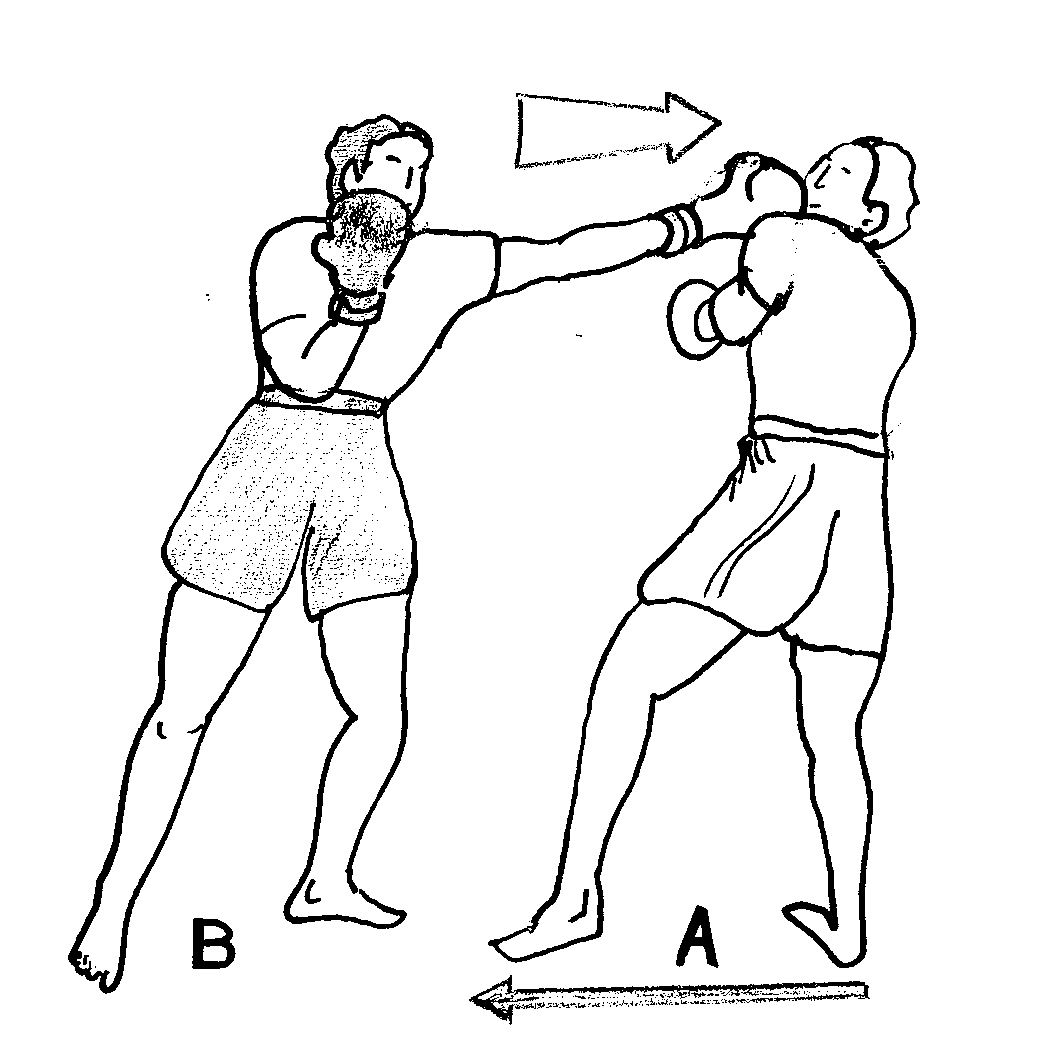
A drawing of a jab.

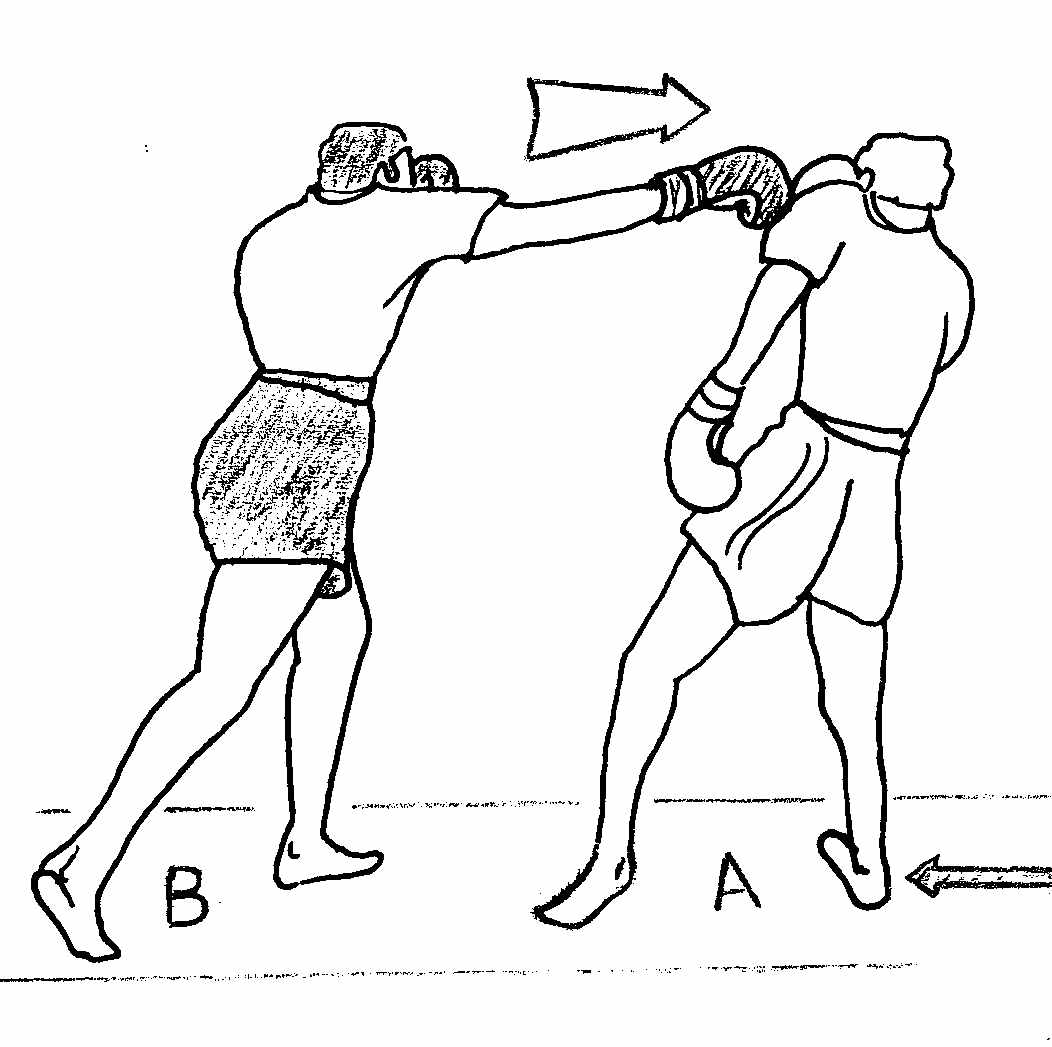
A drawing of a cross.

In boxing, the "one-two combo" is the name given to the combination consisting of two common punches found in boxing – a jab (thrown with the lead hand) followed by the cross (thrown with the back hand). In boxing parlance, fundamental punches are commonly assigned numbers by trainers and in this case there is the jab (#1) and the cross (#2).

Boxers begin practicing the basics starting with offense and generally learn punches starting with the fundamentals - the jab (#1), the cross (#2), then onward to more complex punches such as the lead hook (#3), rear uppercut (#4), lead uppercut (#5) As boxers learn the fundamentals they begin to learn how to incorporate these punches together in a variety of combinations. The "one-two combo" is the first combination a boxer will learn from their coach that utilizes different punches, this is because the one-two combo consist of two fundamental punches first learned as a beginner. It is one of the most commonly used combinations in boxing.

In a one-two combo, the objective is to get in range and land a power-punch. In this situation, both the jab and cross have different purposes. Naturally, the boxing stance has the lead hand in front, closer to the opponent while the dominant hand is in the back, further from the opponent. In this combo, the jab (lead hand) is designed as a range finder to close the distance between a fighter and their opponent to set up a power-punch (backhand). In a one-two combo the cross is the power punch due to the torque and rotation of the body required when using this technique. While throwing this combo, the jab is thrown while stepping forward into range and is followed by the cross while the jab is retracted back to guard, after the cross makes impact it is then retracted back to guard.

When this combination lands successfully, the boxer's jab is used to lift their opponent's head in order to expose their chin for their cross - resulting in the one-two combo.
