= Short straight-punch =

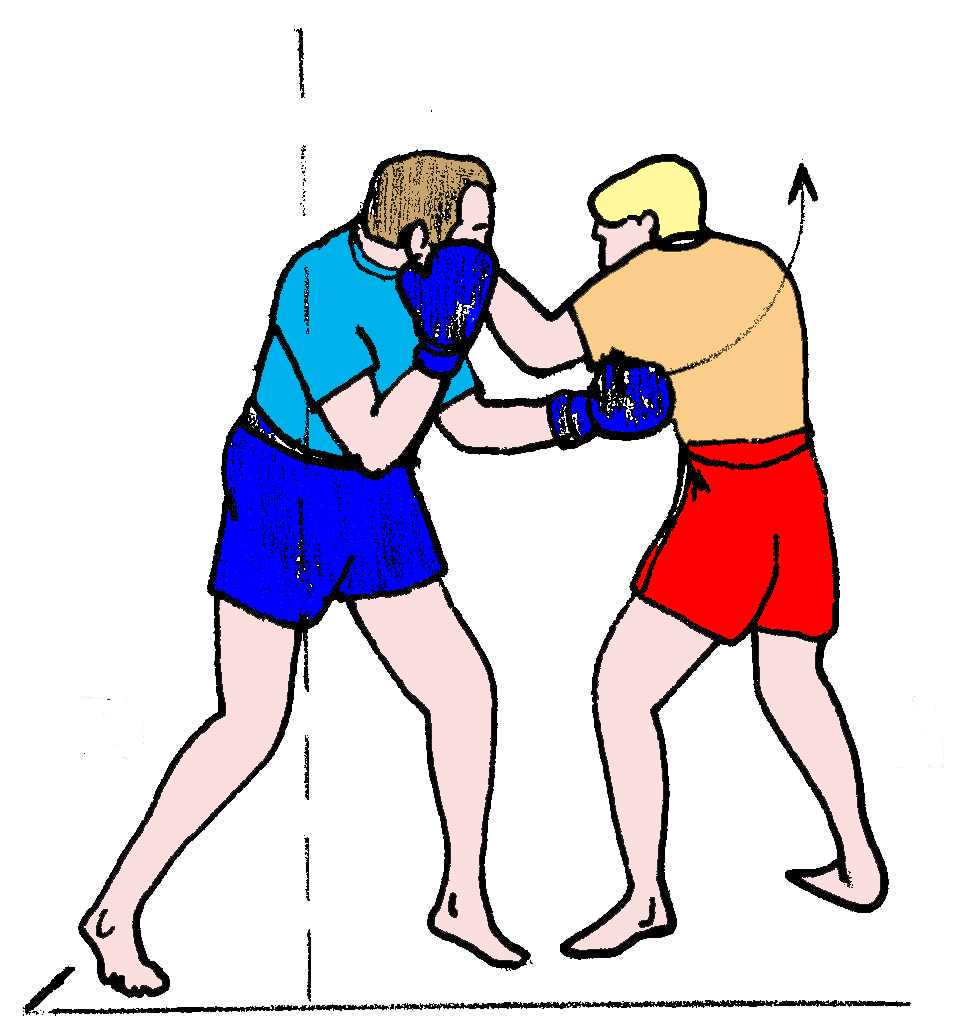
- Short straight-punch in short range Burmese boxing
- Also known as: France: Direct court au corps-à-corps Serbia: Кратеж
- Focus: Striking

The short straight punch is an offensive hand technique used in some fighting sports.

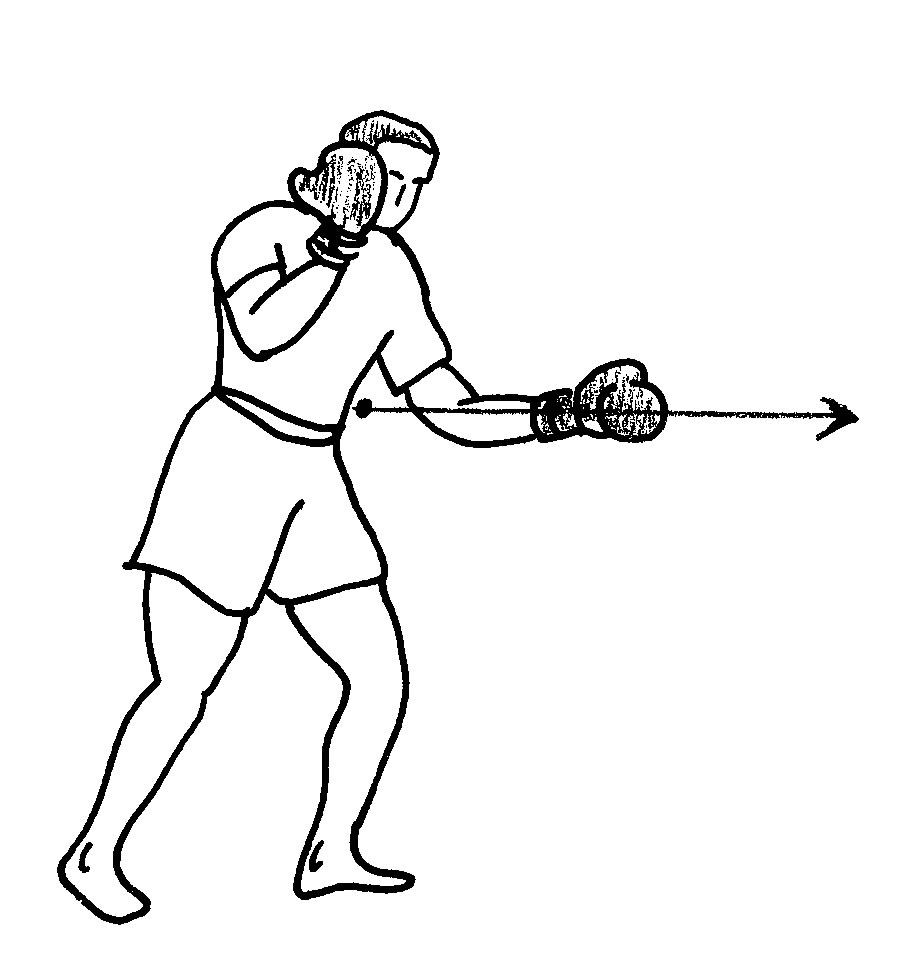
Short straight-punch in shadow-boxing

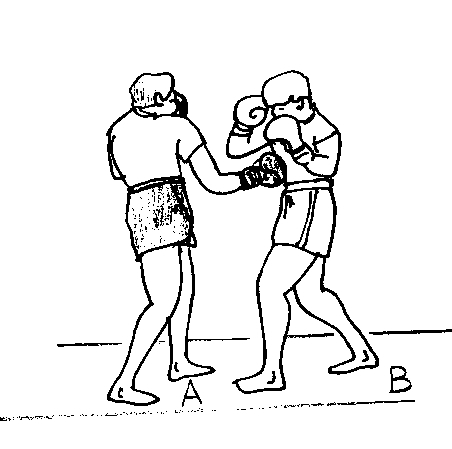
Short straight-punch in clinch

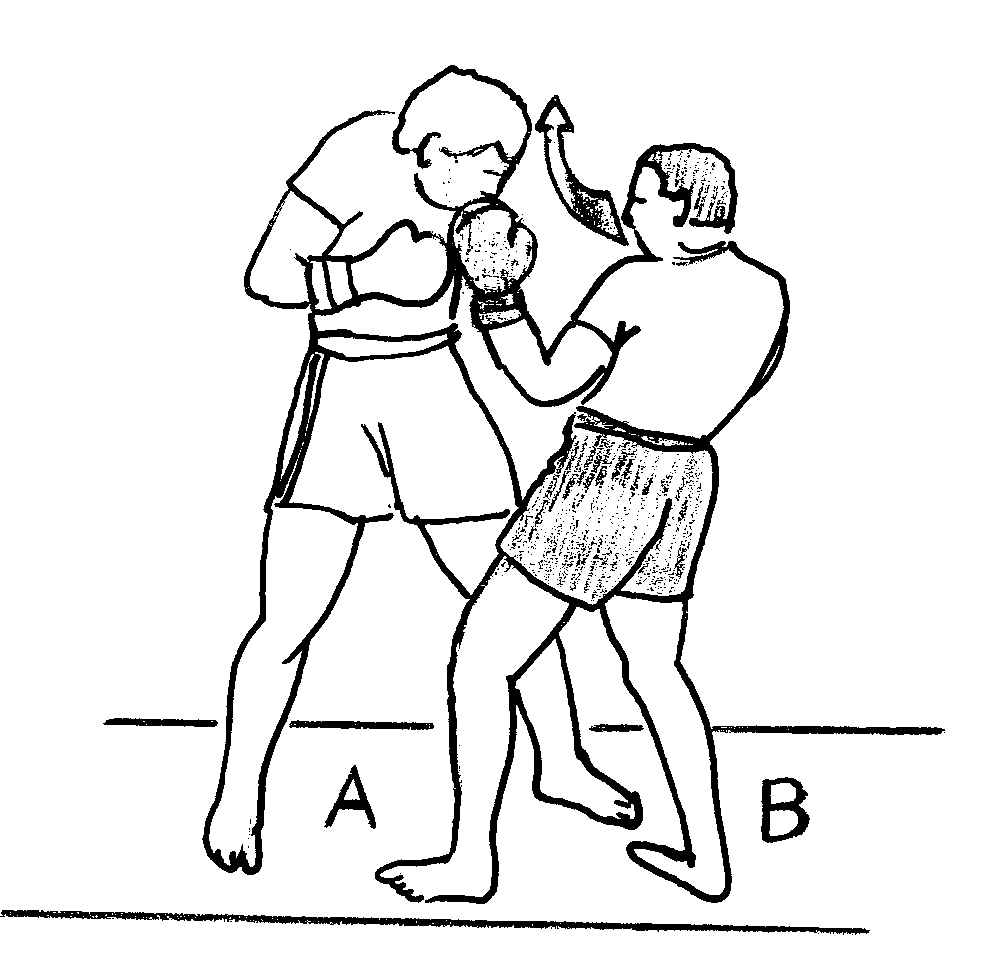
Short straight-punch in counterpunch

== Sources ==
- Georges Blanchet, Boxe et sports de combat en éducation physique, Ed. Chiron, Paris, 1947
- Alain Delmas, 1. Lexique de la boxe et des autres boxes (Document fédéral de formation d’entraîneur), Aix-en-Provence, 1981-2005 – 2. Lexique de combatique (Document fédéral de formation d’entraîneur), Toulouse, 1975–1980.
- Jack Dempsey, Championship fighting, Ed. Jack Cuddy, 1950
- Gabrielle & Roland Habersetzer, Encyclopédie des arts martiaux de l'Extrême-Orient, Ed. Amphora, Paris, 2000
- Louis Lerda, J.C. Casteyre, Sachons boxer, Ed. Vigot, Paris, 1944
