= Check hook =

Technique used in boxing

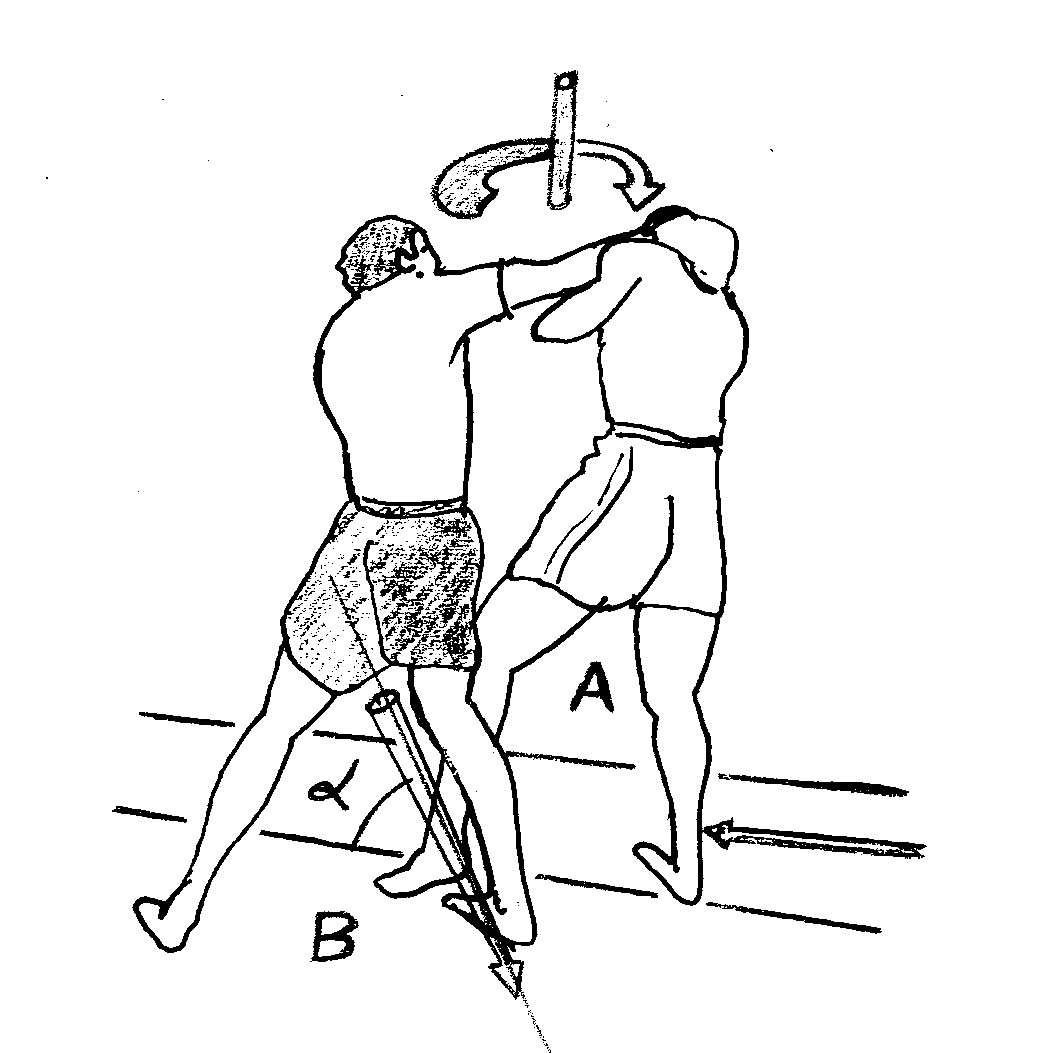
- Check hook after a side step
- Focus: Striking

In boxing, a check hook is employed to prevent aggressive boxers from lunging in. There are two parts to the check hook. The first part consists of a regular hook. The second, trickier part involves the footwork. As the opponent lunges in, the boxer should throw the hook and pivot on his lead foot and swing his back foot 45 to 90 degrees around (sometimes referred to as "turning the corner"). If executed correctly, the aggressive boxer will lunge in and sail harmlessly past his opponent like a bull missing a matador. This is rarely seen in professional boxing as it requires a great disparity in skill level to execute.

Floyd Mayweather Jr. demonstrated an example of this punch against Ricky Hatton in their 2007 encounter. Ricky Hatton was caught with the check hook as he was lunging in; Hatton continued forward as he was knocked off balance and proceeded to ram his head into the ring post as Floyd Mayweather stepped out of harm's way. When interviewed, Mayweather stated that he was taught the check hook in the Michigan amateurs.

== Types of Check Hook ==
Once a boxer is well-versed with the traditional check hook as described above, some of the check hook variations can be even more effective, as follows:-

1) The Lead Check Hook

This variation of the check hook typically works best for orthodox vs. southpaw matchups, and it often leaves the opponent open to a follow-up uppercut as they try to chase. It is deemed highly effective against taller opponents with relatively longer reach as instead of pivoting off to the side, the boxer takes a step to his lead side and fire off the hook at close range.

2) The Backstep Check Hook

First of all, this variation is deemed risky as the boxer might end up in front of the opponent, exposing himself to their attacks. Instead of pivoting off to the side, a step backward is taken with the rear leg thereby enabling him to get out of the way of their punches while landing the check hook.

3) The Switch Stance Check Hook

The switch stance check hook is considered to be an advanced variation of the check hook. In this case the boxer takes a step back with his lead leg, thereby ending up in the opposite stance and then throw a check hook with the revised new lead hand from the switch stance. This type of hook scores higher than usual as opponents who expect a check hook from the normal stance are taken by surprise by receiving a hook with the opposite hand.

4) The Pivot Out Check Hook

This type check hook is executed when the boxer pivots and then throws the punch, allowing him to further empower the hook at the same time keeping him safe and away from opponent’s attacks as he pushes off with the rear leg.

5) The Corkscrew Check Hook

Corkscrew is an even more modern yet effective version of the check hook variation and very popular one especially amongst the shorter fighters. On one hand it allows the boxer to block the opponent’s straight punches while on the other hand it allows him to take a step back and land a solid check hook thrown like a corkscrew jab.
