= Cross (boxing) =

Type of punch found in boxing

Cross (Straight punch)
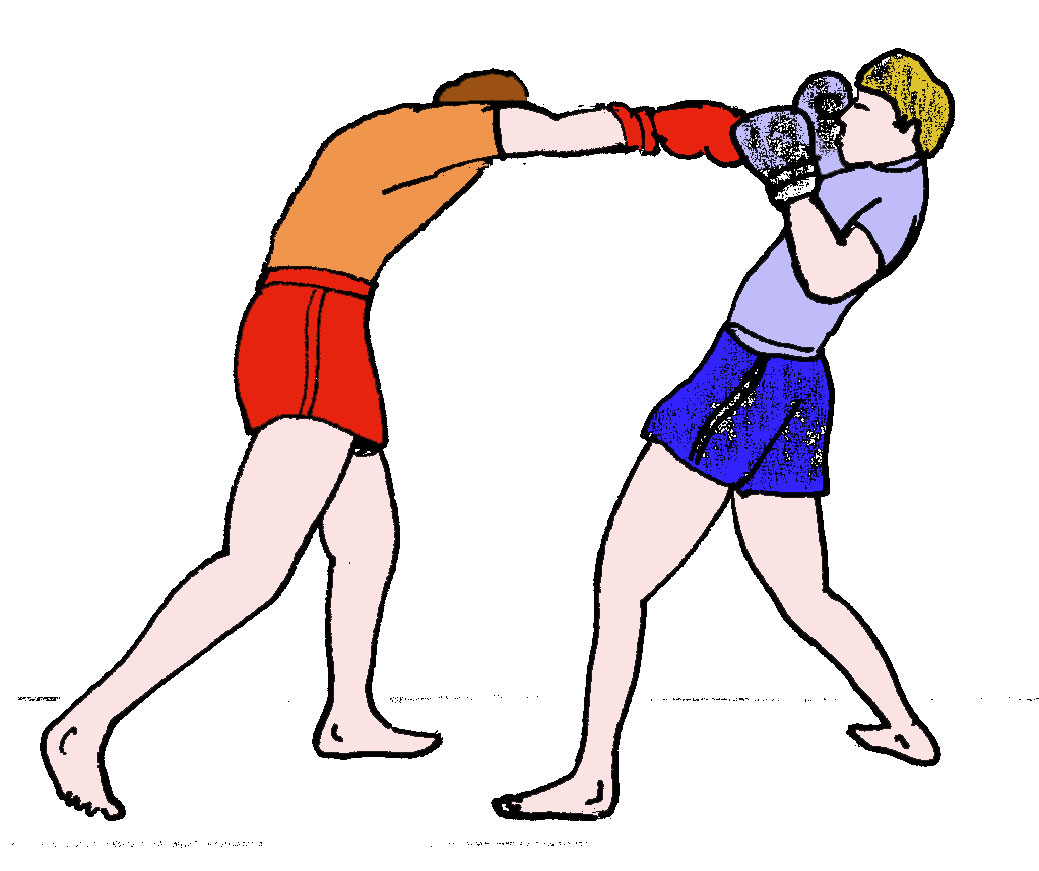
- Cross for the stop in Burmese boxing
- Also known as: France: Direct (bras arrière) Albania:Direkt Serbia: Задњи директ (двојка) Romania: Directă (braţ spate) Japan: Gyaku zuki China: 後手直拳 Russia：Кросс Thailand: Mat Trong Kwa (หมัด ตรง ขวา) (Myanmar) Burma: Pyon Latt-di Poland: Prosty Ukraine: Крос Bulgaria: Прав удар
- Focus: Striking

In boxing, a straight or cross (also commonly called a rear hand punch) are punches usually thrown with the dominant hand and are power punches like the uppercut and hook. Compubox, a computerized punch scoring system, counts the straight and cross as power punches.

The Straight/Cross remains one of the most common methods of knockout across combat sports including boxing, kickboxing, and MMA.

== Technique ==
From the guard position, the rear hand is thrown from the chin, travelling towards the target in a straight line. The rear shoulder comes forward and finishes touching the outside of the chin. For cover, the lead hand can be retracted and tucked against the face to protect the inside of the chin. For additional power, the torso and hips rotate counterclockwise (for right-hand dominant, and clockwise for left-hand dominant) as the straight/cross is thrown. Weight is also transferred from the rear foot to the lead foot, resulting in the rear heel turning outwards to transfer weight. Body rotation and the sudden weight transfer is what gives the straight/cross its power.

If it is thrown the instant an opponent leads with the same side hand, the blow crosses over the leading arm, hence its name. If the rear hand instead travels inside the opponent's guard, it is a straight.

It is commonly used to set up a hook. The straight/cross can also follow a jab, creating the classic "one-two combo". A variation of this is a corkscrew punch where it travels in same angle as hook but keep arm fully extended and flick your wrist to first 2 knuckles.

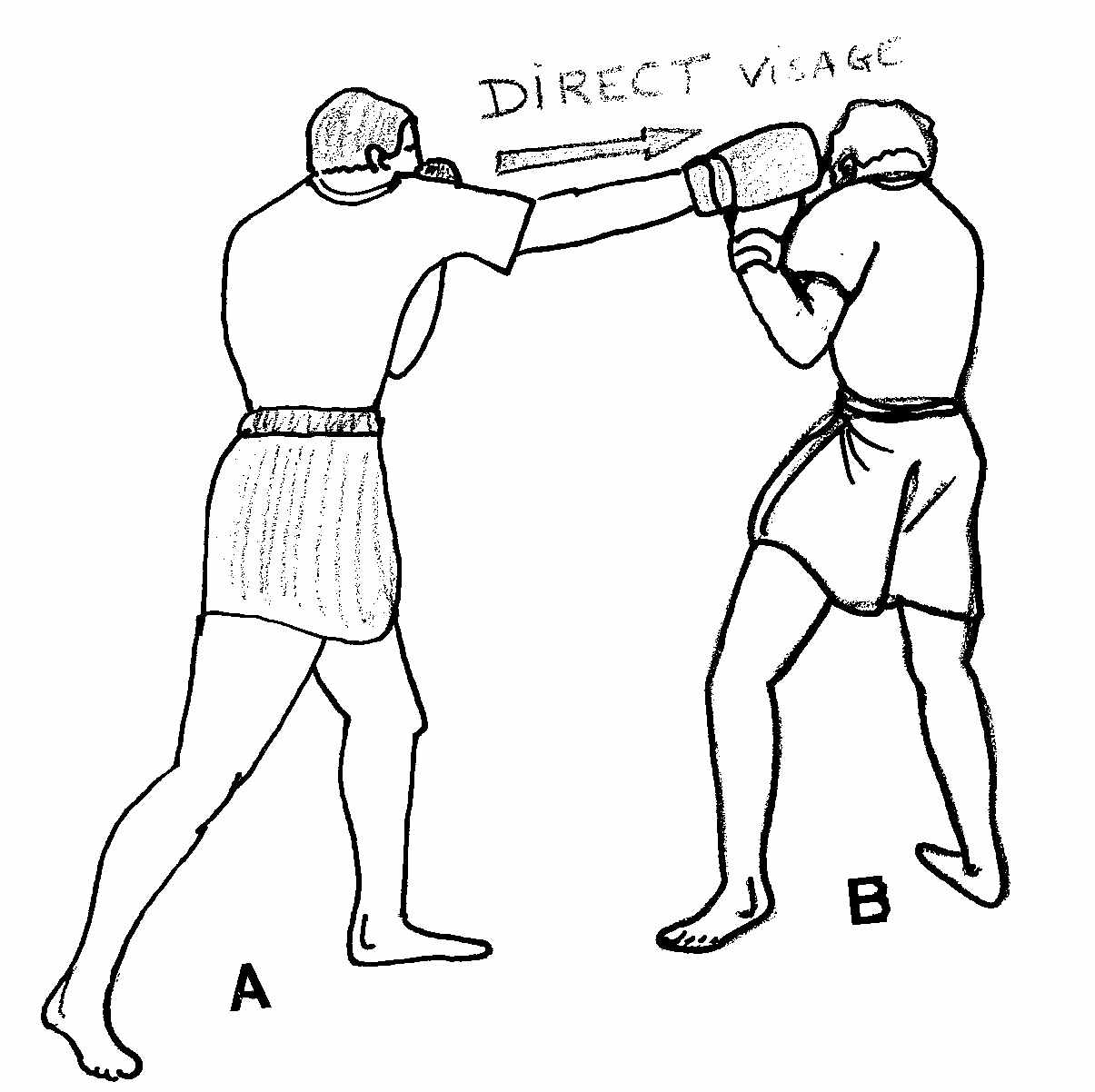
A right cross (as it is traveling over the guard)

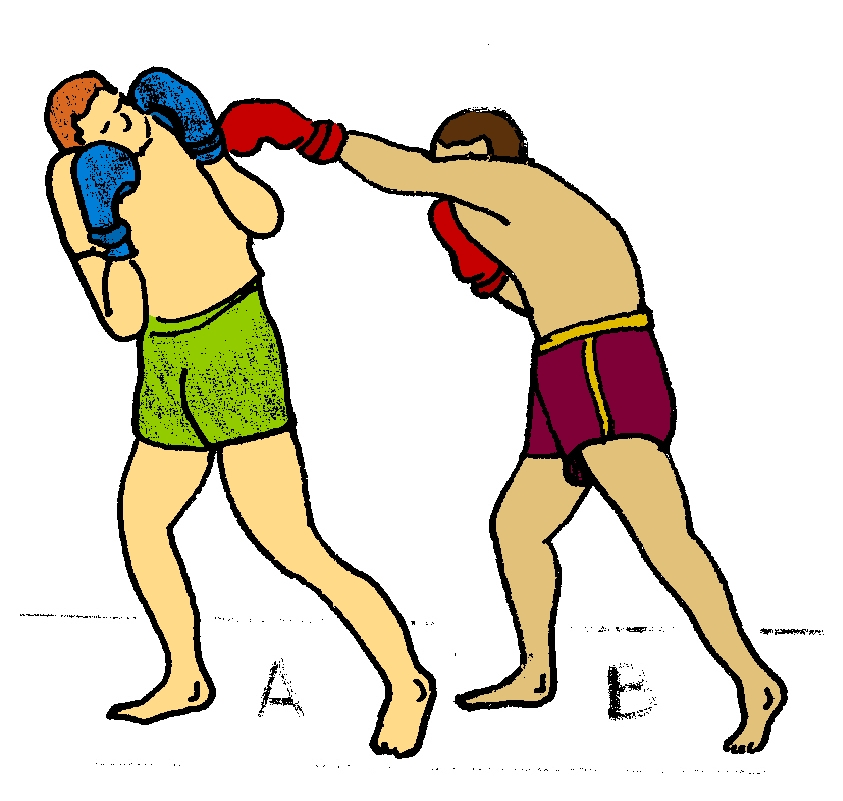
A left straight punch from a Southpaw

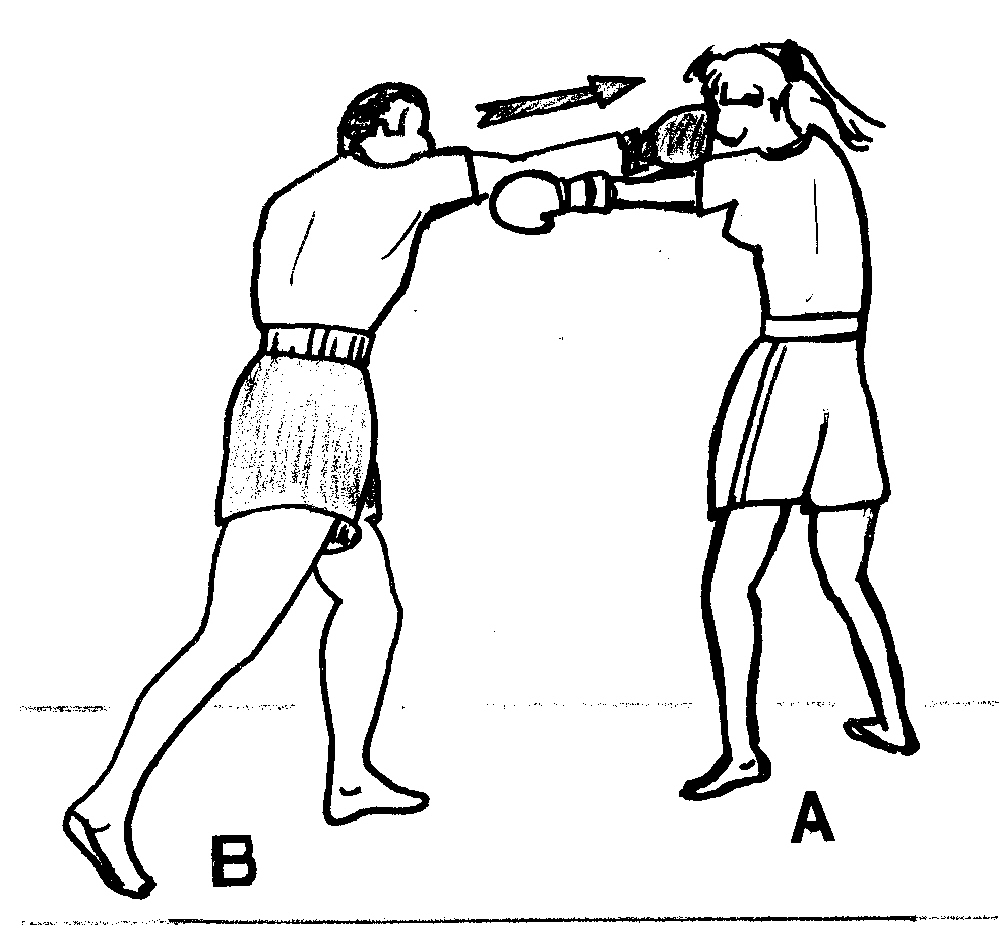
A straight in counterpunch. Were this over the jab, it would be considered a cross.
