= Counterpunch (boxing) =

Type of punch

A counterpunch is a boxing punch that immediately follows an attack launched by an opponent. It exploits the opening created in an opponent's guard.

== Technique ==
Counterpunchers are tactical, fighters who find the middle of offence and defence as well as relying on opponent mistakes or their own ability to provoke an opponent's mistakes in order to gain an attacking advantage to get score cards or the chance of a knockout. They combine their offensive and defensive skills to avoid or block shots in order to immediately place well-timed punches on opponents who have lost their guard.

Boxers who fight against counter punchers must constantly feint and conceal their offensive punches to prevent anticipation for the counterpunch. Successful boxers who use this style must have good reflexes, intelligence, punch accuracy and better-than-average hand speed.

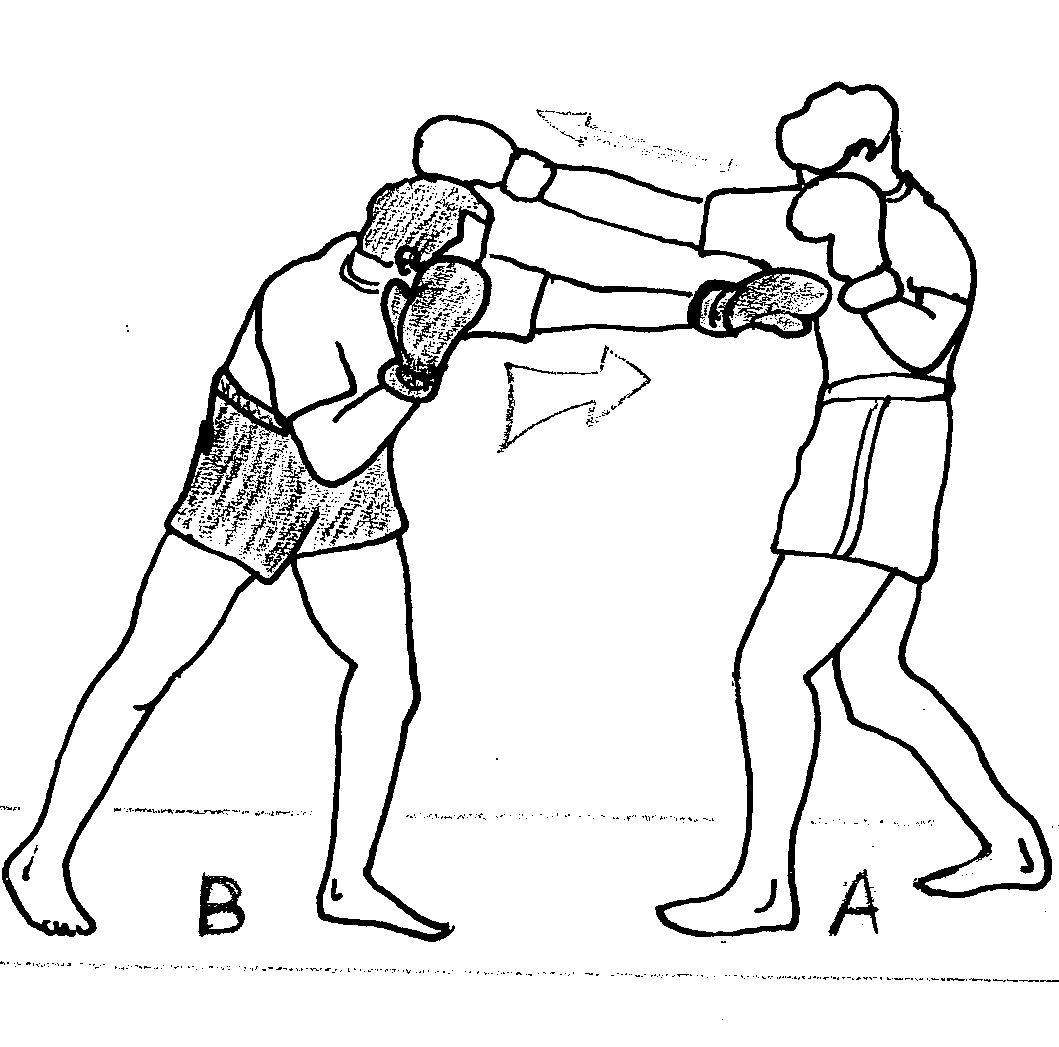
Boxer B makes a left jab counterpunch to the body following Boxer A's right straight punch.

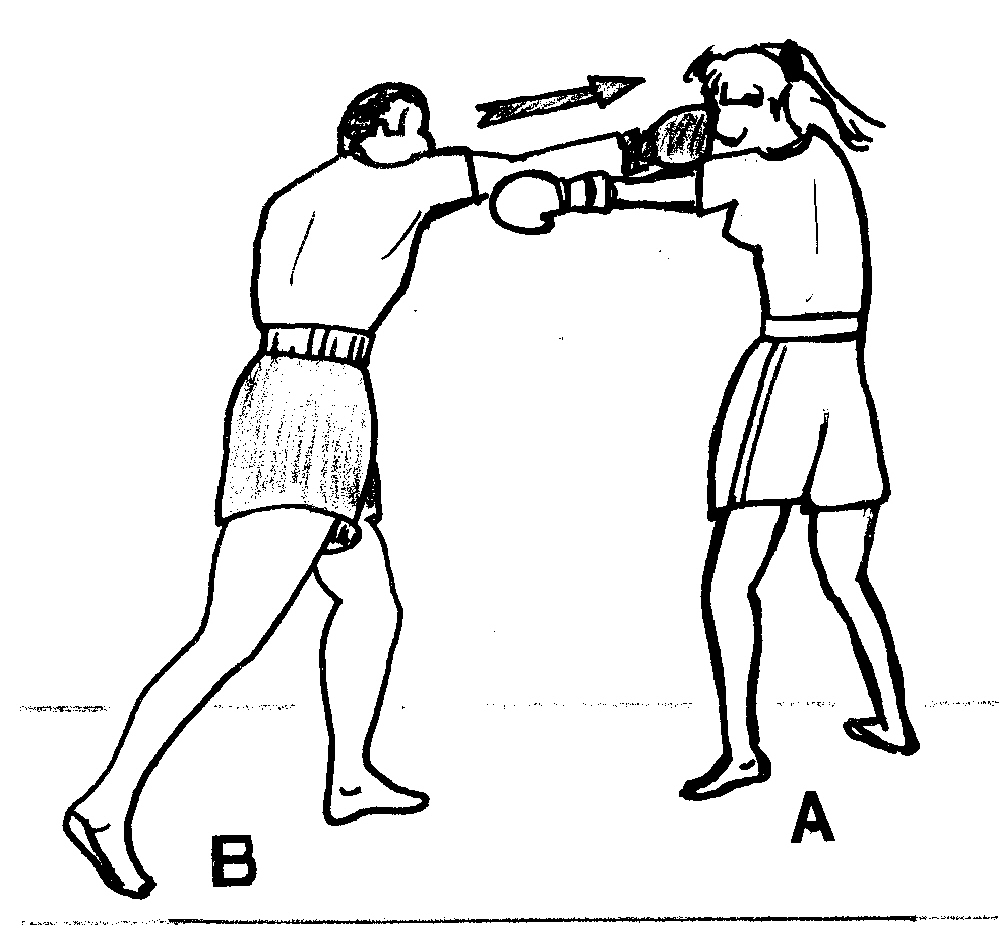
Boxer A's left jab is countered with Boxer B throwing a right straight punch to the head.

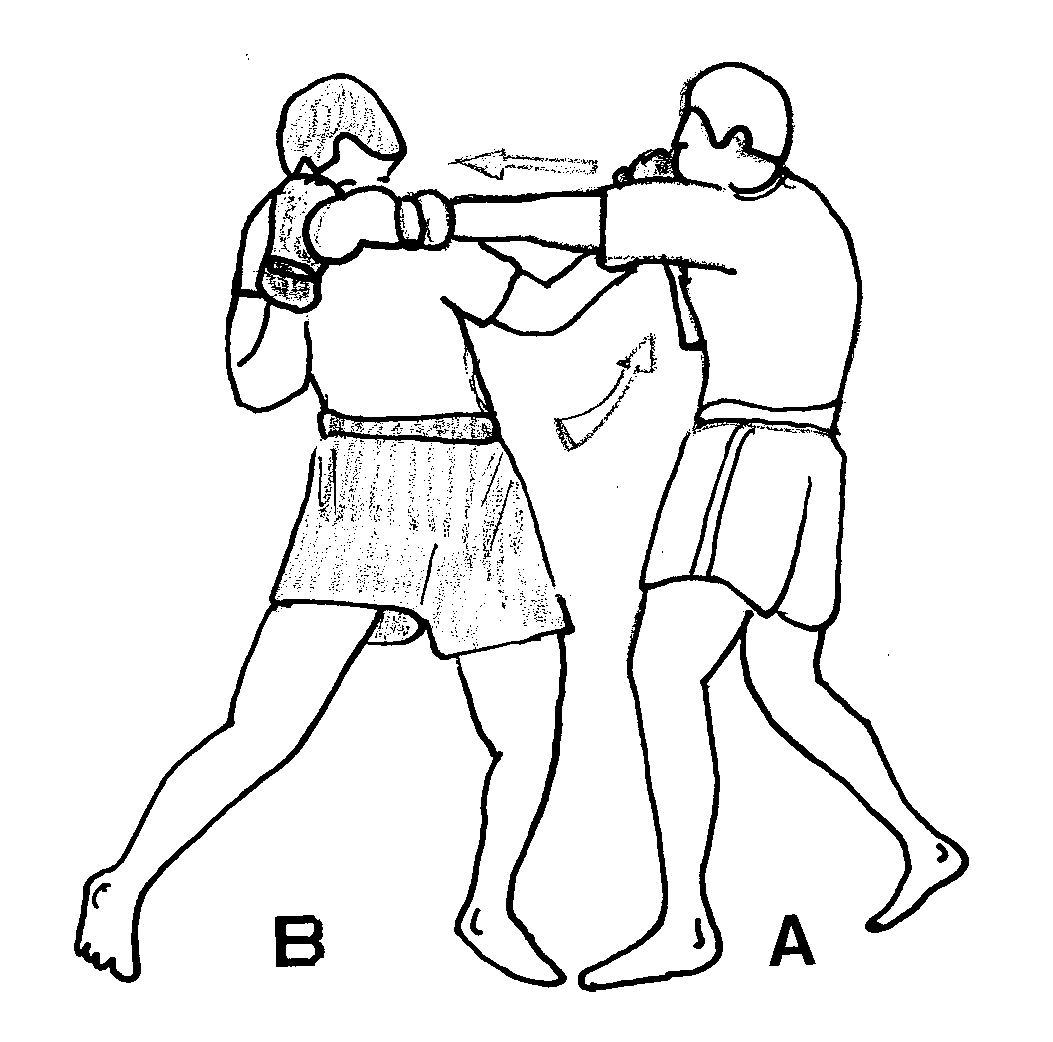
Boxer B uses a bolo punch as an effective counterpunch to a left jab from Boxer A.

=== Cross-counter ===
A cross-counter is a counter-punch begun immediately after an opponent throws a jab, exploiting the opening in the opponent's position.

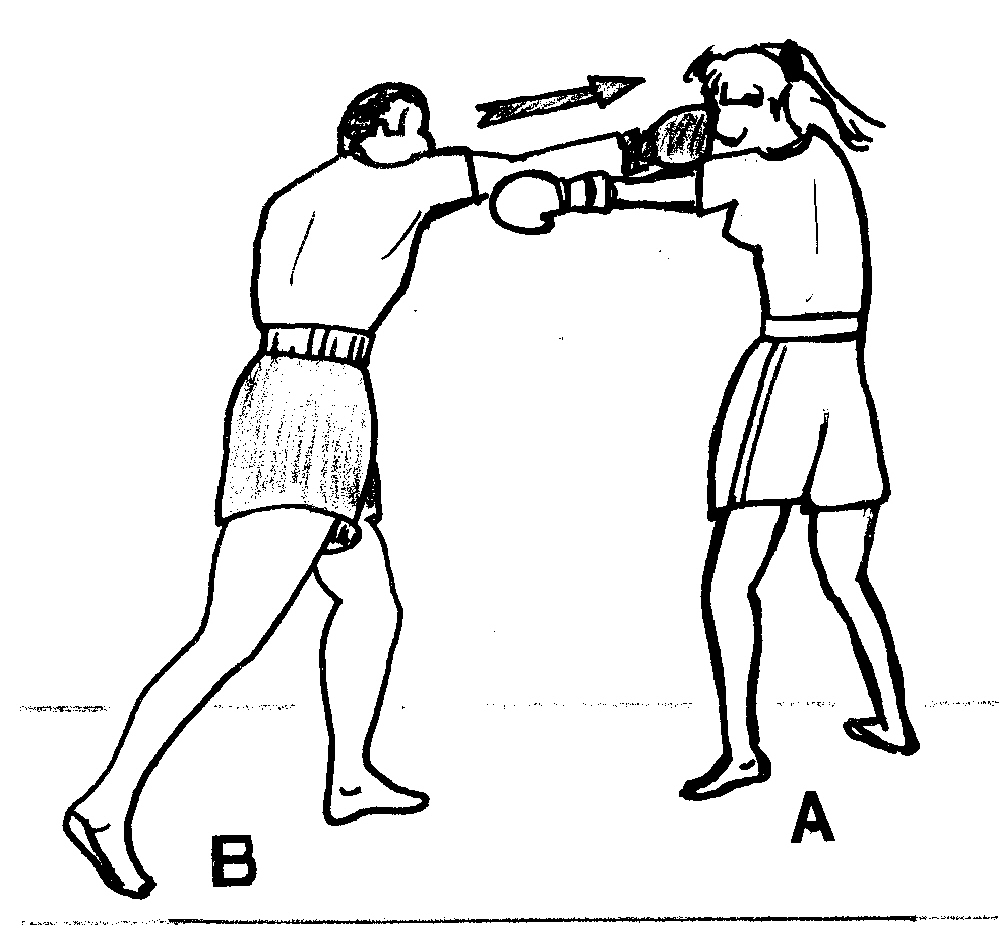
A right straight punch on instance-as a counter-punch after an opponent's left jab

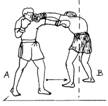
A left jab on instance-as a counter-punch (cross) after an opponent's left jab

== Notable exponents ==
- Young Corbett III
- Mike Tyson
- Marvin Hagler
- Bernard Hopkins
- Ricardo López
- Juan Manuel Márquez
- Canelo Álvarez
- Floyd Mayweather Jr.
- Willie Pep
- Jerry Quarry
- Salvador Sánchez
- James Toney
- Pernell Whitaker
