= Jab =

Type of punch

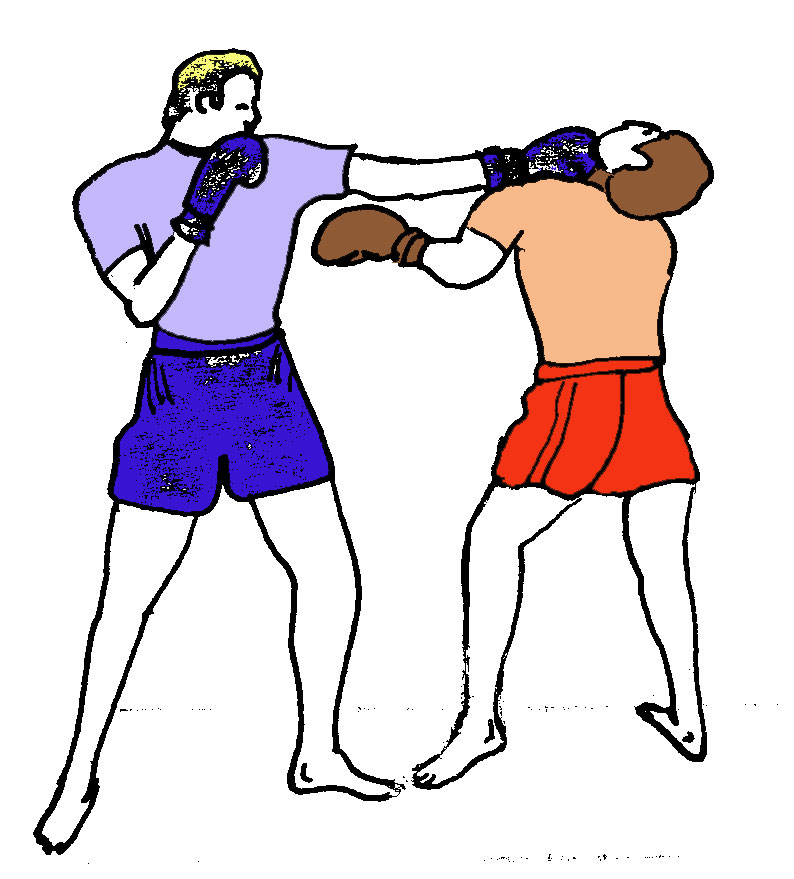
- Also known as: (Albania) Albanian: Direkt Brazil: Direto Bulgaria: Ляв прав (Myanmar) Burmese: Pyon Latt-di (China) Chinese: 前手直拳/ 刺拳 (Croatia) Croatian: Prednji direkt (Czech Republic) Czech: Direkt (Netherlands) Dutch: Directe (Estonia) Estonian: Sirge (France) French: Direct (bras avant) (Germany) German: Gerade (Führhand) (Israel) Hebrew: ישרה (Italy) Italian: Diretto (Japan) Japanese: Kizami zuki / Jun zuki (Choku zuki) (Poland) Polish: Prosty (Romania) Romanian: Directă (braţ faţă) (Russia) Russian：Джеб (Serbia) Serbian: Предњи директ (кец) (Thailand) Thai: Mat Trong Say (หมัด ตรง ซ้าย) (Vietnam) Vietnamese: Đấm quai hàm.
- Focus: Striking

A jab is a type of punch used in martial arts. Several variations of the jab exist, but every jab shares these characteristics: while in a fighting stance, the lead fist is thrown straight ahead and the arm is fully extended from the side of the torso. This process also involves a quick turn of the torso. It is an overhand punch; at the moment of impact, the pronated fist is generally held in a horizontal orientation with the palm facing the ground. This is also called a "front punch."

Jabs are usually aimed at the face or function as a feint, to lead to a second punch. Dynamic muscles involved in the jab include deltoids, triceps, pectorals, and the serratus anterior in the extension of the arm, and quadriceps and calves in the body drive.

== Etymology ==
The word jab was first used in 1825, to mean "to thrust with a point." The term is a Scottish variant of the word job, which means "to strike, pierce, thrust."

== Uses ==
=== Defense ===
A jab is an integral part of a fighter's defense. Its speed and power of execution and reach can keep the opponent at a distance, preventing him from charging in. Defensive jabs can be employed while moving backwards.

=== Speed jab ===
This jab gives a fighter high mobility and is often used with the intention of scoring points. Fighters use this variation of the jab when they want to preserve the mobility and balance of their stance.

=== Rangefinding jab ===
Used in order to establish a feeling for distance, the rangefinding jab is often used to set up a power punch with the other hand. Thus it can help conserve stamina and lower the risk of being countered by allowing the fighter to commit his stronger hand only when he is within proper range.

Boxers have been wobbled by a rangefinding jab.

=== Power jab ===
Power can be added to a jab if it is thrown with a moderate step forward. The drawback to this technique is that it takes the fighter out of his boxing stance, committing him to the punch rather more than the speed jab. A "pivot jab" is the most powerful jab, one in which the weight shifts almost entirely to the lead foot, which pivots to put the mass of the body behind the punch. Jabbing from the hip, rather than from a tight guard, will add power to the jab at the expense of speed.

=== Jab to the body ===
Jabbing to the body is relatively uncommon, because it increases a fighter's vulnerability to a counterpunch. Typically, the fighter bends at the waist and fires a speed jab to the midsection of his opponent in an attempt at getting the opponent to drop his guard. It is impractical to put the body weight behind this punch, so power is limited. The jab to the body can be used effectively to counter the opponents lead jab.

=== Jab combinations ===
- Jabs are often doubled up in an attempt at getting the opponent to compromise his guard.
- "Jabbing on the fly" is a point-scoring maneuver that employs a quick series of speed jabs thrown by a circling fighter.
- Most combinations start with a jab as a way of closing the distance and finding the proper range. In this context, the jab is referred to as a "set-up jab".
- Many fighters end their combinations with a jab that is designed to stifle counterpunches.

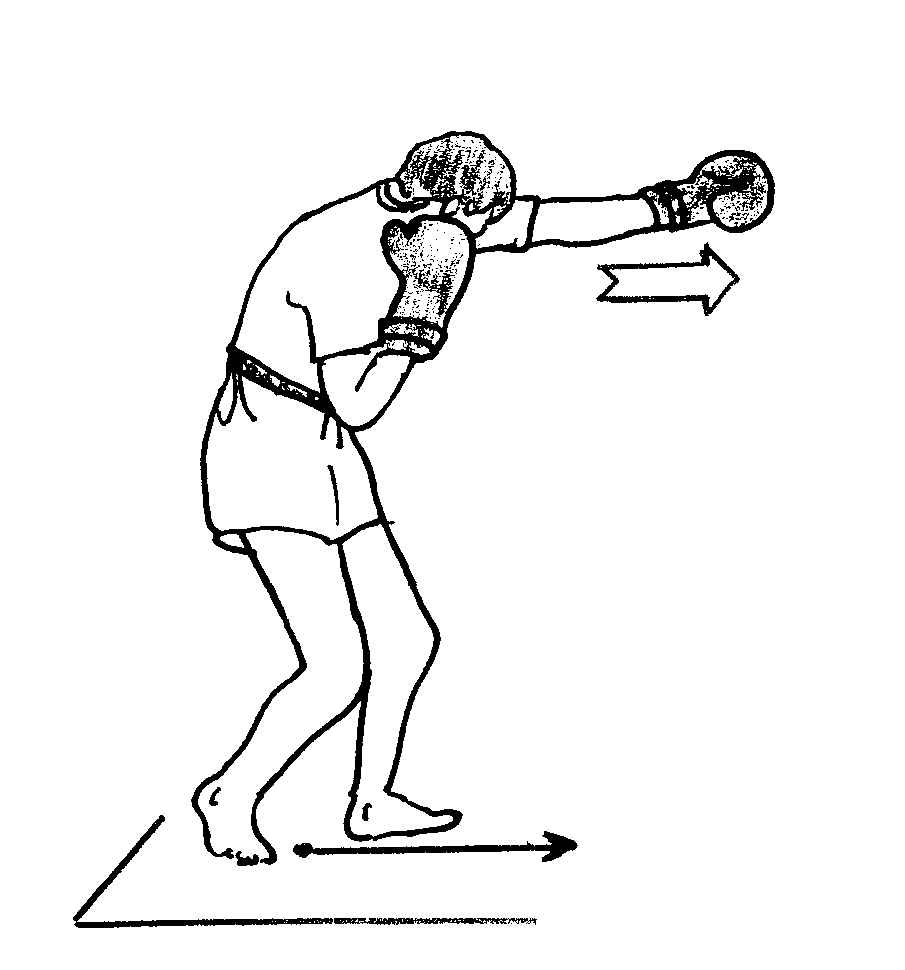
Jab with full crouch

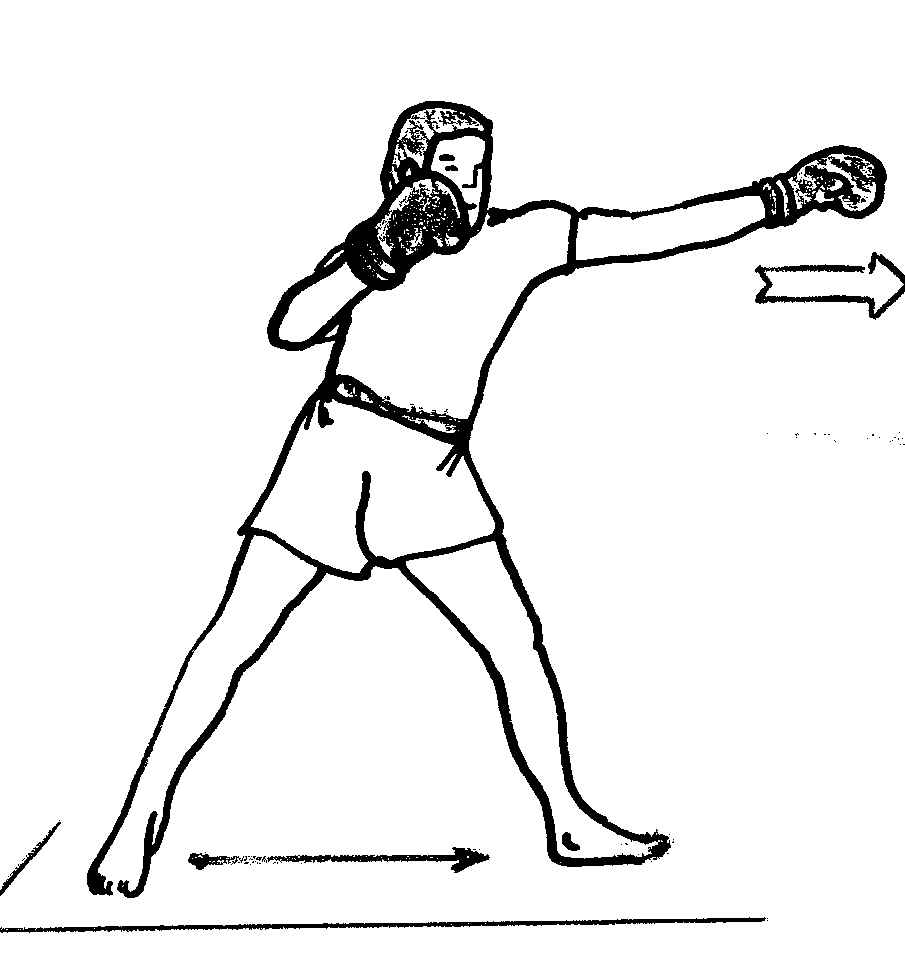
Jab with side stance

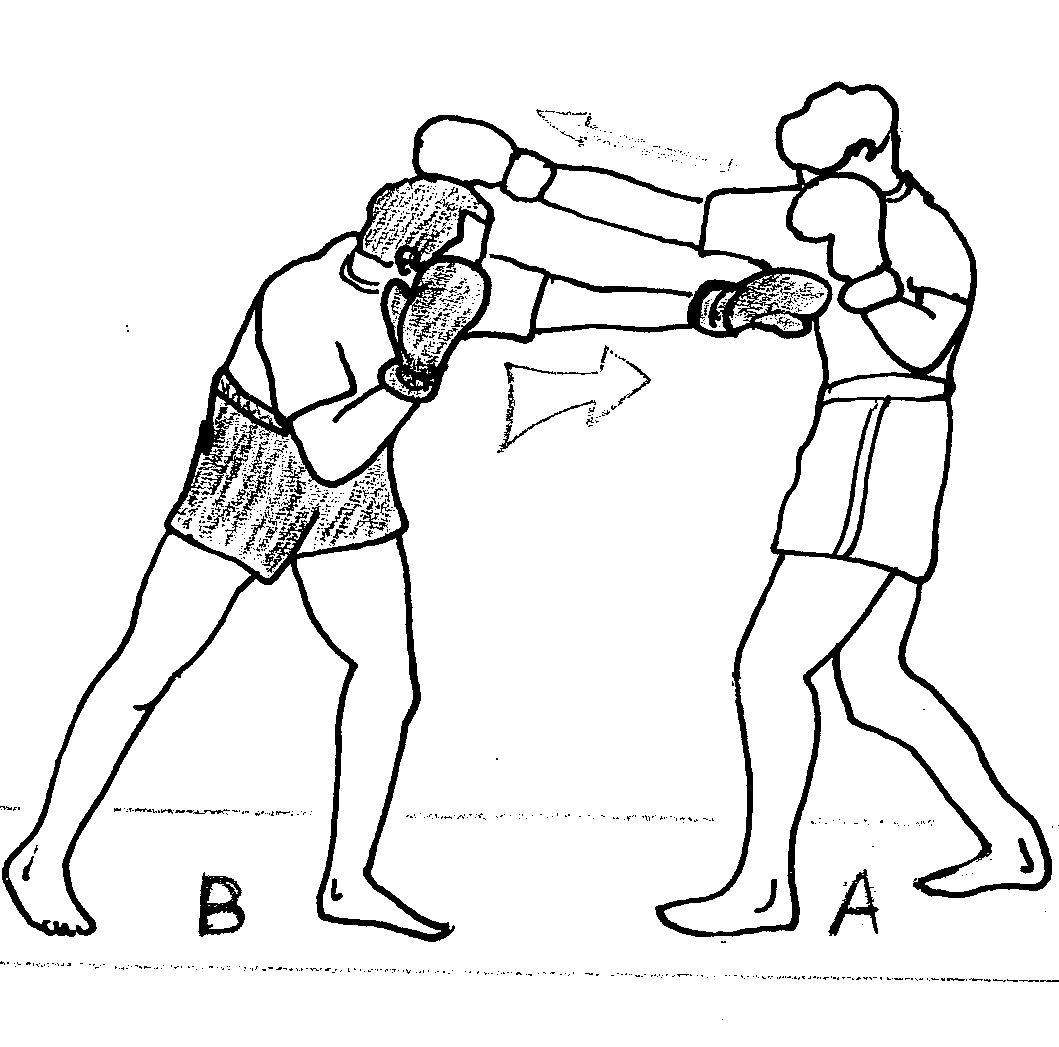
Jab in counterpunch

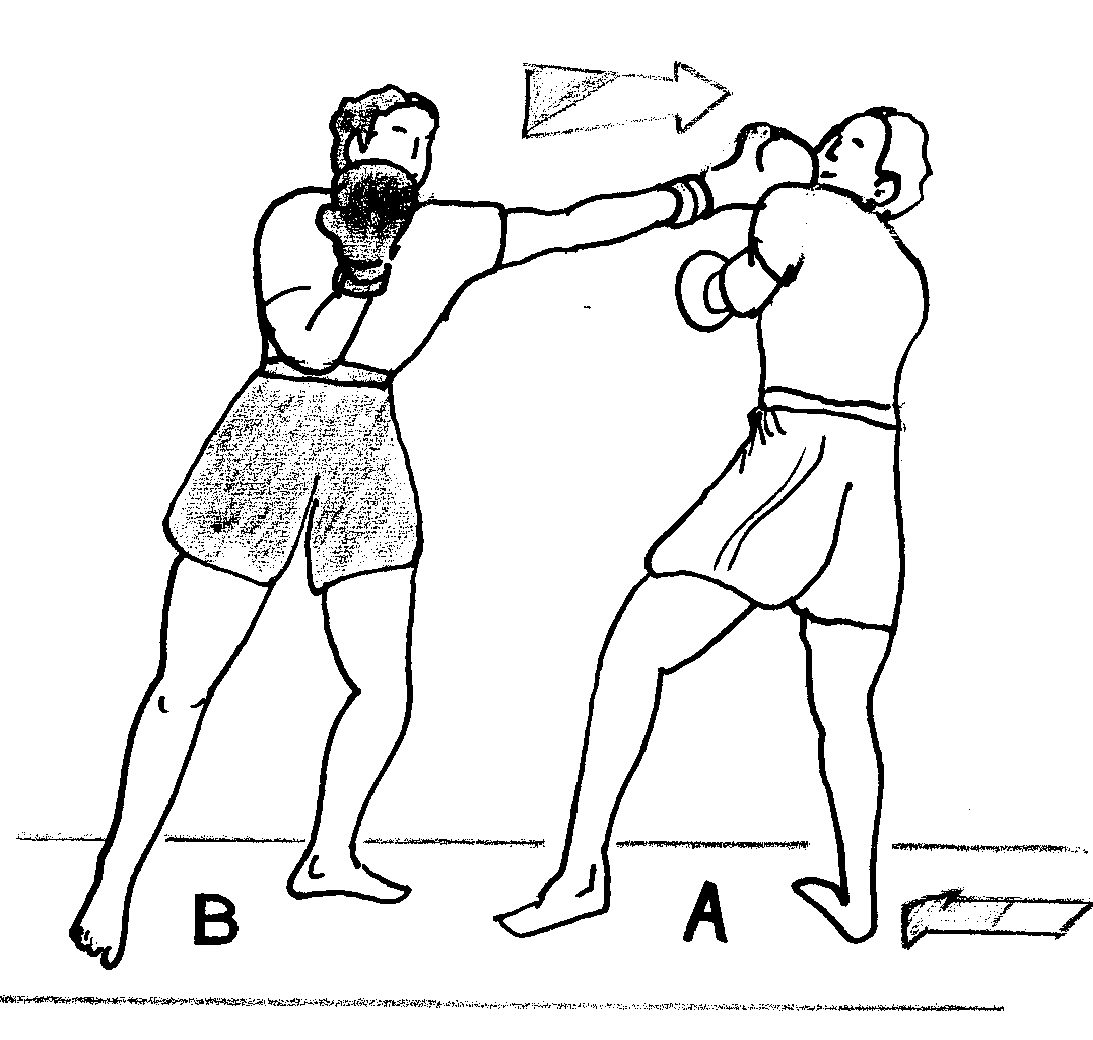
Jab for the stop

Historians consider some of the best jabbers in history to be Sonny Liston, Larry Holmes, Muhammad Ali, and George Foreman. Recent master jabbers include Lennox Lewis and Wladimir Klitschko, both coached by the same trainer and able to develop significant power into their jabs. Holmes' jab has often been called "the best among Heavyweights", Ali's jab was famous for its speed and Liston's for its power. Mike Tyson used a rare version of a slip jab, that allowed him to jab effectively against taller opponents with longer reach. Gennady Golovkin has been regarded as having one of the most proficient jabs in boxing.

== See also ==
- Hook (boxing)
- Cross (boxing)
- Uppercut
- Bolo punch
- One-two combo

== Bibliography ==
- Link, Norman and Lily Chou (2011). The Anatomy of Martial Arts: An Illustrated Guide to the Muscles Used in Key Kicks, Strikes and Throws. Ulysses Press. ISBN 978-1-56975-787-1
