= Hook (boxing) =

Boxing punch

- Also known as: English: Left hook, right hook; Israel: מגל; Spain: Gancho; Albanian: Kroshe; Estonia: Haak; Czech: Hák; Serbia: Кроше; Finland: Koukku; France: Crochet (coup crocheté); Germany: Haken; Romania: Croşeu; Japan: Mawashi tsuki; Russia: Хук; Italy: Gancio; Thailand: Mat Wiyeng San (หมัดเหวี่ยงสั้น); Burma: Wai Latt-di; Poland: Sierpowy; Greece: Κροσέ (krose); Turkey: Kroşe (croche); China: 摆拳; Latvia: Āķis; Lithuania: Kablys; Ukraine: Гук; Saudi Arabia: خطاف; Bulgaria: Кроше; Hungary: Horog
- Focus: Striking

A hook is a punch in boxing. It is performed by turning the core muscles and back, thereby swinging the arm, which is bent at an angle near or at 90 degrees, in a horizontal arc into the opponent. A hook is usually aimed at the jaw, but it can also be used for body shots, especially to the liver.

== Technique and variations ==
Hook punches can be thrown by either the lead hand or the rear hand, but the term used without a qualifier usually refers to a lead hook.

When throwing a hook, the puncher shifts his body weight to the lead foot, allowing him to pivot his lead foot and generate kinetic energy through the hip, torso, and shoulder, swinging his lead fist horizontally toward the opponent. Sometimes, depending on style and what feels comfortable to the individual, the lead foot is not pivoted. Pivoting increases the power of the punch, but leaves one lacking in options to follow up with, such as the right uppercut or right hook.

The hook is a powerful punch with knockout power.

Variations of the hook are the shovel hook or upper-hook; a punch that combines elements of a traditional hook and an uppercut, often thrown at a 45-degree angle. It's designed to hit the opponent's body or chin, and the "shoveling" motion is meant to dig in, similar to using a shovel.

Another variation on the hook is the check hook, which combines an ordinary hook with footwork that removes a boxer from the path of a lunging opponent.

Several boxers noted for their hooks are Joe Frazier, Bob Foster, Jack Dempsey, Henry Cooper, David Tua, Tommy Morrison, Rubén Olivares, Félix Trinidad, Andy Lee, Sam Hyde and Mike Tyson.

== Gallery ==
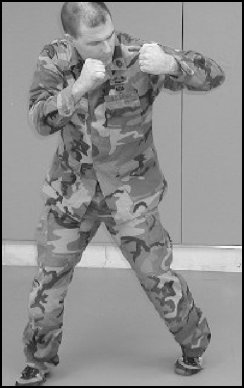
A hook

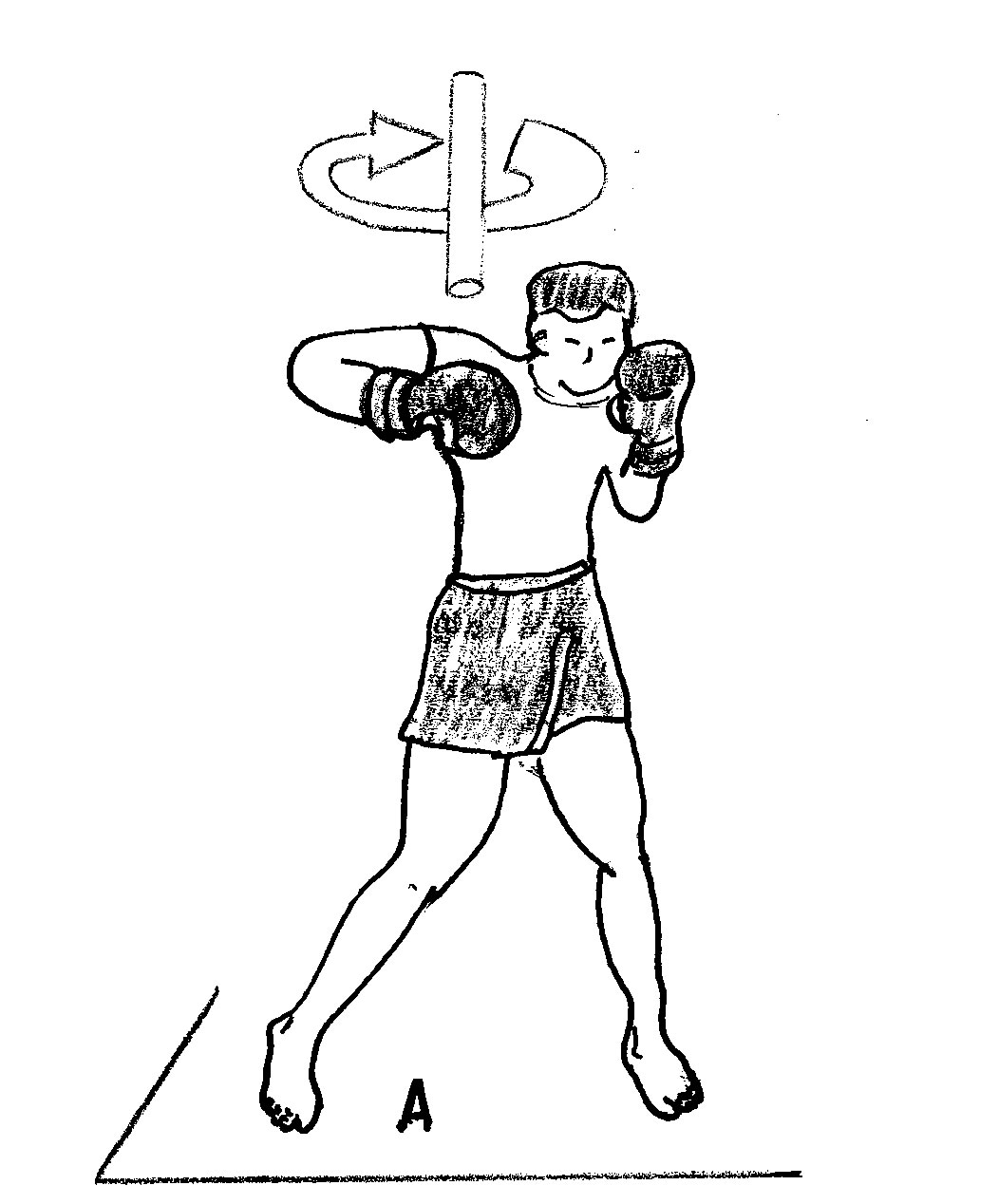
Hook in shadowboxing

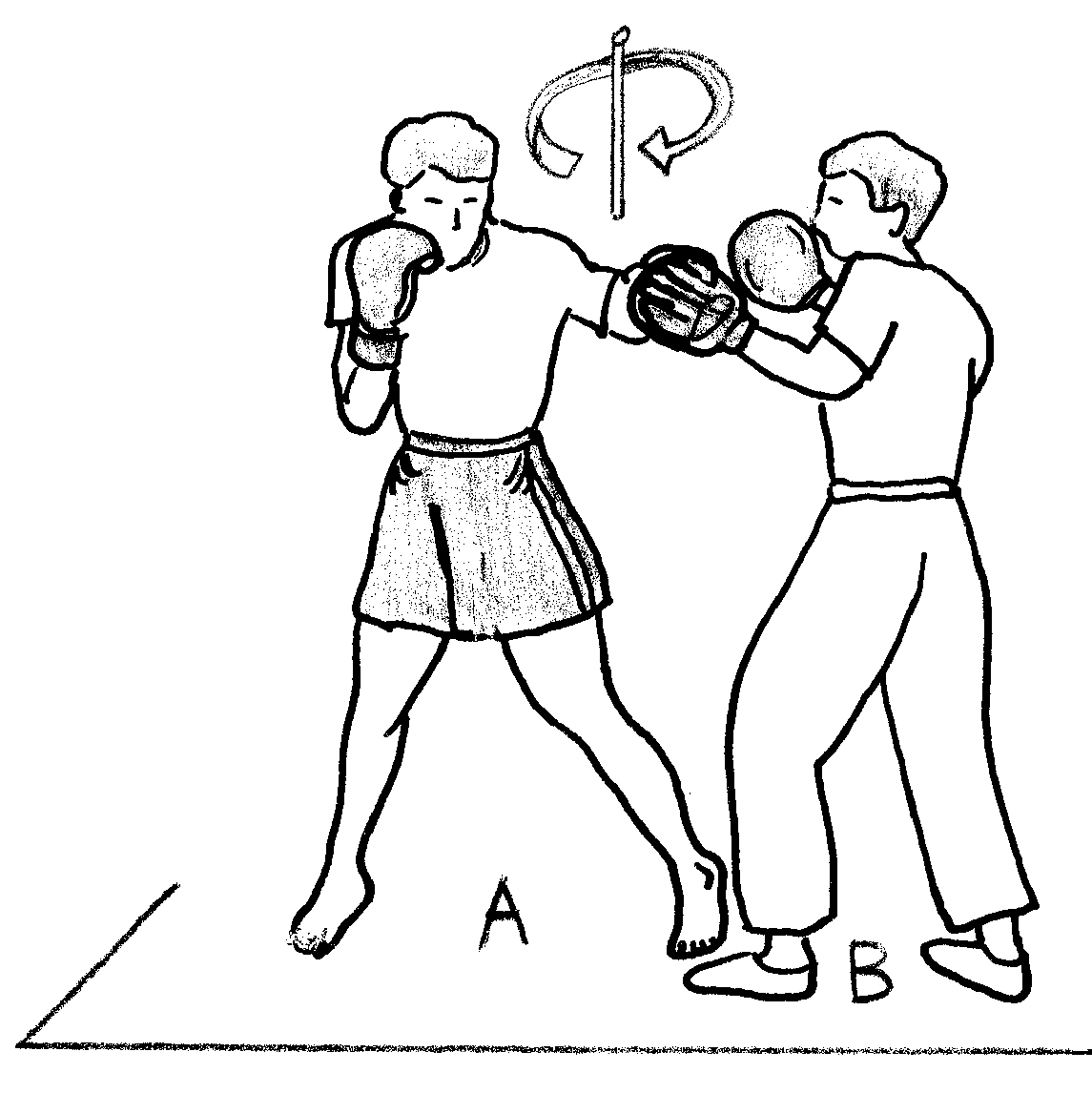
Another hook

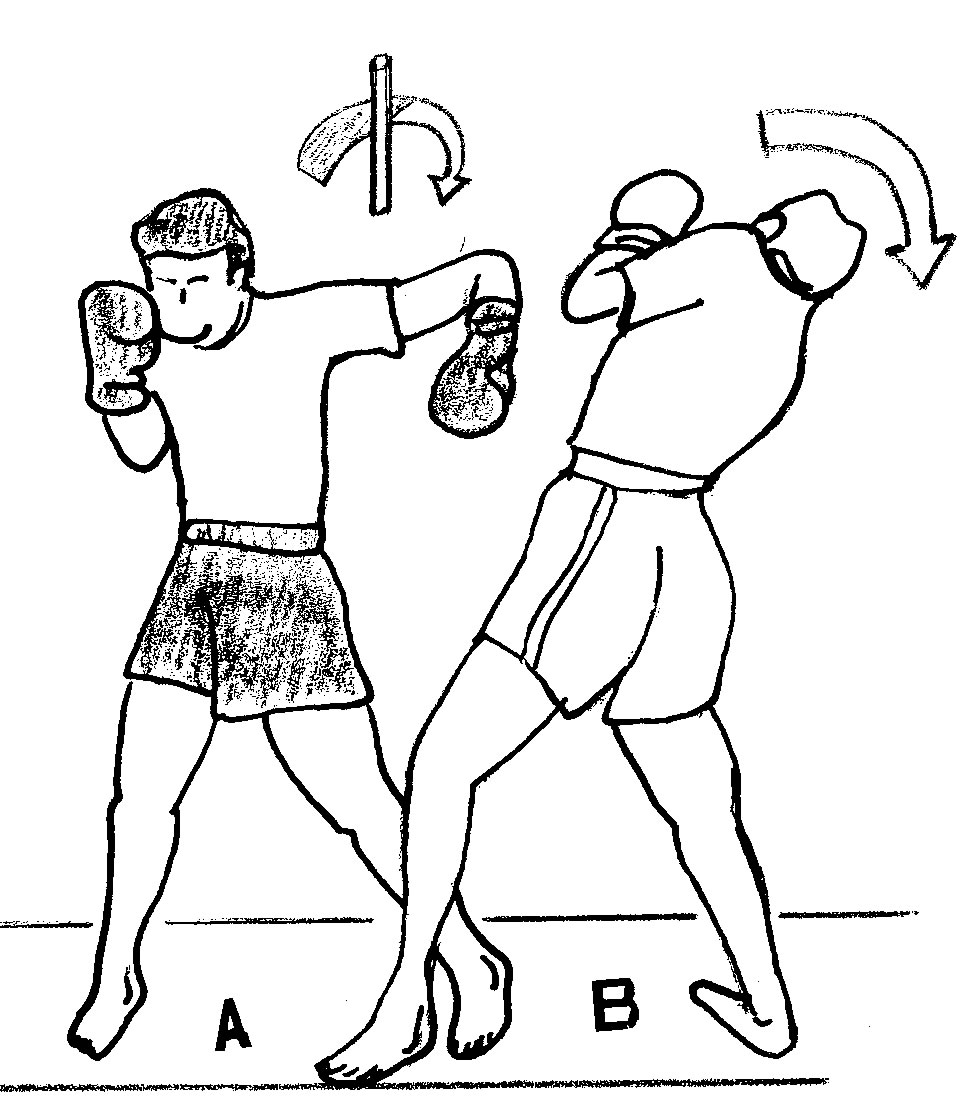
Left hook in medium range

== See also ==
- Bolo punch
- Russian hook
- Cross (boxing)
- Jab
- Uppercut
