= Uppercut =

Boxing punch

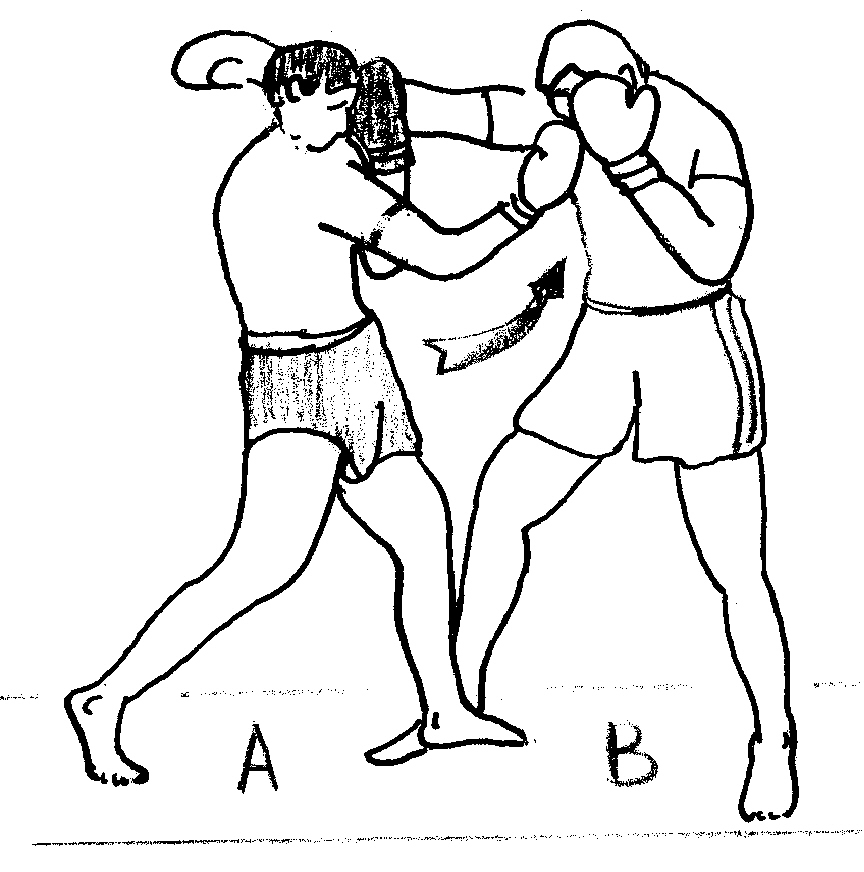
Uppercut in counterpunch

The uppercut (formerly known as the undercut) is a punch used in boxing that starts low and travels upwards vertically aiming at the opponent's chin or upper abdomen (so-called "solar plexus"). It is, along with the cross, one of the two main punches that count in the statistics as power punches.

Uppercuts are useful when thrown at close range, because they are considered to cause more damage. The uppercut is a powerful punch capable of delivering a knockout strike. Additionally, it is likely that a boxer would miss if the uppercut is thrown when the opponents are apart. Uppercuts usually do more damage when landed to the chin, but they can also cause severe pain and injury when thrown to the body (particularly the solar plexus) or when landing on the nose or eyes.

The punch moves as its name implies: it usually initiates from the attacker's belly, making an upward motion that resembles a pirate's hook in shape, before landing on the opponent's face or body. In a conventional boxing combination, it is the second punch thrown, after the jab, but it can either initiate or finish a combination.

When performing an uppercut, the attacker should stay close to the target, so as to prevent the opponent from detecting that the punch is coming, and countering with a straight punch. An uppercut from the outside also loses some of its power because the arm is no longer bent at the elbow and cannot effectively transfer the total body's force in the upward movement.

Samuel Elias, also known as "Dutch Sam", is credited with creating this punch originally called an "undercut". It was reported that "Dutch Sam created havoc with the new blow until a new way was found to block it". Boxers famous for their uppercuts include Lennox Lewis, Joe Louis, Wilfredo Gómez, Julio César Chávez, Sonny Liston, George Foreman, Mike Tyson, Rubén Olivares, and Sandy Saddler.
