= Professional wrestling weight classes =

Weight classes used in professional wrestling

In professional wrestling, a weight class is a standardized weight range for the wrestlers. The top class in almost every promotion is heavyweight, but super heavyweights exist. Weight class matches in modern-day American professional wrestling are rare, but weight class championships still exist. However, Japanese professional wrestling, Mexican wrestling and traditional British wrestling use the weight classes more seriously.

== Australia ==
=== Australian professional wrestling championships determined by weight class ===
Name	Promotion	Weight limit
Australian Light Heavyweight Championship	National	Unknown
Australian Middleweight Championship	National	Unknown
Australian Welterweight Championship	National	Unknown
NWA World Light Heavyweight Championship (Australian version)	World Championship Wrestling (Australia)	92–97 kg
Pacific Pro Wrestling Light Heavyweight Championship	Pacific Pro Wrestling	<85 kg
World Light Heavyweight Championship (Australian version)	National	Unknown
WWA International Cruiserweight Championship	World Wrestling All-Stars	Unknown

== United States ==
WWE, the largest professional wrestling promotion both nationally and internationally, had a reserved championship exclusively for wrestlers under the "Cruiserweight" category until 2022. Historically, WWE has had a number of championships that were only competed by lighter wrestlers such as the WWE Light Heavyweight Championship which became defunct in 2001. Conversely, WWE's so-called "Heavyweight" championships are not exclusive to heavyweight performers (240 lbs and above), as they have been won by comparatively smaller wrestlers such as Rey Mysterio and AJ Styles.

While some of the smaller, independent wrestling promotions use weight classes, most of the larger promotions do not. Even if weight classes are used, they are usually not enforced due to the scripted nature of professional wrestling. In March 2013, Total Nonstop Action Wrestling (TNA) imposed a 230 lb (104 kg) weight limit for wrestlers competing in the X Division for the TNA X Division Championship. In October 2013, however, TNA wrestler Samoa Joe, billed at 280 lb (127 kg), competed in an X Division Championship bout at TNA's Bound for Glory pay-per-view. Rather, it's more common for wrestling promotions to create a secondary championship to be competed for by smaller wrestlers. This championship, depending upon the promotion, is usually named Cruiserweight, Light Heavyweight or Junior Heavyweight. In some sports, most notably boxing since it has a large number of weight classes, these three names represent different separate weight classes. In professional wrestling the upper weight limit of these championships varied and are often not strictly enforced, depending upon the desires of company management, but usually ranged from a maximum of 215 pounds to 230 pounds depending upon the promotion. Throughout the years, practically all of such championships have been retired due to the wrestling promotion closing down or losing interest. The oldest of these championships still active in the United States is the NWA World Junior Heavyweight Championship. Created in 1945, the title is also recognized and frequently defended in other promotions outside of the United States.

=== US pro wrestling championships determined by weight class ===
Name	Promotion	Weight limit	Years active
AWA World Light Heavyweight Championship	American Wrestling Association	<220 lbs.	June 1981 – 1993
TNA X Division Championship	Total Nonstop Action Wrestling	No official weight limits, formerly 225, 230 lbs.	June 19, 2002 – present
WCW Cruiserweight Championship	World Championship Wrestling/WWE	<225 lbs.	March 20, 1996 – September 25, 2007 After WCW was purchased by WWE, then the WWF, in March 2001, the WWF included the WCW Light Heavyweight Championship as part of the lineage of the WCW Cruiserweight Championship. The title was renamed the WWE Cruiserweight title when, WWF turned into WWE.
WCW Light Heavyweight Championship	World Championship Wrestling	<235 lbs.	October 27, 1991 – September 2, 1992
WWF Light Heavyweight Championship	WWE/UWA	<215 lbs.	March 26, 1981 – November 25, 2001 Originally sanctioned as a co-promotion with the Mexican UWA until its closure in 1995, it was then defended in NJPW before becoming a full-time WWF title in 1997. It was abandoned in favor of the WWE Cruiserweight title.
NXT Cruiserweight Championship	WWE	<205 lbs.	September 14, 2016 – January 4, 2022

=== Former NWA Weight Classes ===
The only active National Wrestling Alliance championships in a specified weight division are the NWA World Heavyweight Championship (active since July 14, 1948) and the NWA World Junior Heavyweight Championship (revived in March 2022). The usual weight limit between the two is 225 lbs., but in practice the heavyweight championship is open to any weight class.

Name	Weight limit	Years active	Notes
NWA World Super Heavyweight Championship	Unlimited	2003 – 2005	Controlled by Pro Wrestling Zero1
NWA World Light Heavyweight Championship	<200 lbs.	November 6, 1952 – August 2010	Controlled by Empresa Mexicana de Lucha Libre since 1958 and kept by successor promotion Consejo Mundial de Lucha Libre until 2010; replaced with Historic version (see below). An alternate version existed in New Jersey from 1997 to 1998.
NWA World Middleweight Championship	<185 lbs.	1939 – August 2010	Controlled by Empresa Mexicana de Lucha Libre and kept by successor promotion Consejo Mundial de Lucha Libre until 2010; replaced with Historic versions (see below).
NWA World Welterweight Championship	<170 lbs.	March 15, 1946 – June 1992; December 1995 – April 2016	Controlled by Empresa Mexicana de Lucha Libre and kept by successor promotion Consejo Mundial de Lucha Libre until 2010; replaced with Historic versions (see below).

== Mexico ==
No other professional wrestling promotions have made such an extensive use of weight classes as some located in Mexico. The lucha libre style is highly prominent in Mexico and makes extensive use of high spots and a fast, sometimes frantic, pace that suits physically smaller wrestlers. As a result, most of the top professional wrestling stars in Mexico are lighter than those in many American promotions. Whereas the few American promotions and governing bodies, such as the National Wrestling Alliance, have what would be termed a Cruiserweight, Light Heavyweight or Junior Heavyweight division, several Mexican wrestling promotions have multiple weight classes.

=== Mexican pro wrestling championships determined by weight class ===
Name	Promotion	Weight limit	Years active
AAA World Cruiserweight Championship	Lucha Libre AAA Worldwide	<105 kg	May 21, 2009 – present
CMLL World Light Heavyweight Championship	Consejo Mundial de Lucha Libre	between 92 and 97 kg	September 26, 1991 – present
CMLL World Middleweight Championship	Consejo Mundial de Lucha Libre	between 82 and 87 kg	December 18, 1991 – present
CMLL World Welterweight Championship	Consejo Mundial de Lucha Libre	between 70 and 78 kg	February 15, 1992 – present
CMLL World Lightweight Championship	Consejo Mundial de Lucha Libre	between 63 and 70 kg	February 27, 1999 – present
NWA World Historic Light Heavyweight Championship	Consejo Mundial de Lucha Libre	between 92 and 97 kg	August 12, 2010 – present
NWA World Historic Middleweight Championship	Consejo Mundial de Lucha Libre	between 82 and 87 kg	August 12, 2010 – present
NWA World Historic Welterweight Championship	Consejo Mundial de Lucha Libre	between 70 and 78 kg	August 12, 2010 – present
Mexican National Light Heavyweight Championship	Consejo Mundial de Lucha Libre	between 92 and 97 kg	September 25, 1942 – present
Mexican National Welterweight Championship	Consejo Mundial de Lucha Libre	between 77 and 87 kg	June 17, 1934 – present
Mexican National Lightweight Championship	Consejo Mundial de Lucha Libre	between 63 and 70 kg	June 28, 1934 – present
IWRG Intercontinental Middleweight Championship	International Wrestling Revolution Group	between 82 and 87 kg	July 27, 1997 – present
IWRG Intercontinental Welterweight Championship	International Wrestling Revolution Group	between 70 and 78 kg	March 1, 1998 – present
IWRG Intercontinental Lightweight Championship	International Wrestling Revolution Group	between 63 and 70 kg	May 29, 2008 – present
IWRG Intercontinental Super Welterweight Championship	International Wrestling Revolution Group	between 70 and 78 kg	November 19, 2006 – 2007

== Japan ==
As with Mexico, non-heavyweight wrestling championships have risen to prominence in a number of Japanese wrestling promotions. Unlike Mexico, however, and more in line with most promotions in the United States, most Japanese wrestling companies generally have a secondary singles and, in some cases, a tag team championship geared to the Cruiserweight/Junior Heavyweight/Light Heavyweight weight division rather than multiple weight divisions; lower weight division belts are usually imported from Mexico, as in the case of the UWA titles.

=== Japanese pro wrestling championships determined by weight class ===
- BJW Junior Heavyweight Championship: February 3, 1998 – 2002
- BJW Junior Heavyweight Championship: May 7, 2017 – present
- GHC Junior Heavyweight Championship: June 24, 2001 – present
- GHC Junior Heavyweight Tag Team Championship: July 16, 2003 – present
- Independent World Junior Heavyweight Championship: October 28, 1993 – present
- Tenryu Project International Junior Heavyweight Championship: March 26, 1995 – present
- International Junior Heavyweight Tag Team Championship: February 23, 1996 – present
- IWGP Junior Heavyweight Championship: February 6, 1986 – present
- IWGP Junior Heavyweight Tag Team Championship: August 8, 1998 – present
- NWA International Lightweight Tag Team Championship: December 23, 2003 – present
- Zero1 NWA World Junior Heavyweight Championship: September 20, 2011 – present
- Osaka Light Heavyweight Championship: July 31, 2022 – present
- Tohoku Junior Heavyweight Championship: August 25, 2002 – present
- UWA World Light Heavyweight Championship: November 25, 1975 – present
- UWA World Middleweight Championship: November 26, 1975 – present
- AJPW World Junior Heavyweight Championship: July 31, 1986 – present
- Zero1 International Junior Heavyweight Championship: June 29, 2002 – present

== United Kingdom ==
The 1947 Admiral-Lord Mountevans rules set out seven weight divisions with maximum weight limits and called for champions to be crowned of each limit: Lightweight: 11st (154 lb or ~70 kg), Welterweight 11st 11 lb (165 lb or ~75 kg), Middleweight 12st 8 lb (176 lb or ~80 kg), Heavy Middleweight 13st 5 lb (187 lb or ~85 kg), Light Heavyweight 14st 2 lb (198 lb or ~90 kg), Mid-Heavyweight 14st 13 lb (209 lb or ~95 kg) and Heavyweight for all weights upwards of 15st (210 lb or ~95 kg). The system has survived into the 21st century among traditional style British promotions. Since 2000 there has so far been at least one new champion crowned in all seven weight divisions and one new British champion in all divisions except Heavy Middleweight (vacant since 1996).

An earlier system of weight classes with different levels and more divisions existed under the 1930 All-In rules. Many "American style"/"New School" promotions follow the example of modern US promotions of having a Cruiserweight/Junior Heavyweight/etc division alongside primarily Heavyweight competition.

- British Commonwealth Junior Heavyweight Championship
- British Flyweight Championship (2005–2012)
- British Lightweight Championship (1933–present)
- British Welterweight Championship (1938–present)
- British Middleweight Championship (1930s–2005)
- British Heavy Middleweight Championship (1953–1990s)
- British Light Heavyweight Championship (1920s–2004, 2014–present)
- British Mid-Heavyweight Championship (1952–1981, 2002–present)
- European Heavyweight Championship
- European Mid-Heavyweight Championship
- European Junior Heavyweight Championship
- European Cruiserweight Championship
- European Light Heavyweight Championship
- European Middleweight Championship (up to 1995)
- European Welterweight Championship (up to 1994)
- European Lightweight Championship
- World Lightweight Championship (1950-2001)
- World Welterweight Championship (up to 1970)
- World Middleweight Championship (1976-1981, 1991-1996)
- World Heavy Middleweight Championship (1981-2012)
- World Light Heavyweight Championship
- World Mid-Heavyweight Championship(up to 1999)
- World Heavyweight Championship (1979-1989, 1991)
- ICW Zero-G Championship
- RQW Cruiserweight Championship
- PWP Catch Division Championship

An exclusion does apply to charity-run organisations, whereby the organisation is not required to have weight divisions and may use the weight, without impersonation, to market their product for the charity and/or cause and nothing further. Organisations of this nature may also have a smaller roster of professional wrestlers to be able to separate weight divisions and therefore, all athletes must sign a contractual disclaimer in order to compete.

== European mainland ==
Professional wrestling in France and in Spain in the 20th century used similar weight systems to the United Kingdom, minus a Heavy Middleweight division.

== Russian Federation ==
=== Russian professional wrestling championships determined by weight class ===
- IWF Lightweight Championship: limited by 187 lbs

== See also ==
- Brazilian Jiu-Jitsu weight classes
- Boxing Weight Class
- Kickboxing weight classes
- Mixed martial arts weight classes
- Taekwondo weight classes
- Wrestling weight classes
