= Jim Breaks =

British professional wrestler (1940–2023)

Personal information
- Born: James Breaks; 25 March 1940 Bradford, West Riding of Yorkshire, England
- Died: 25 December 2023 (aged 83) Gran Canaria, Spain

Professional wrestling career
- Ring name: Jim "Cry Baby" Breaks
- Trained by: Bernard Murray
- Debut: December 1958
- Retired: March 1991

James Breaks (25 March 1940 – 25 December 2023) was an English professional wrestler. A holder of several of the Mountevans championships he regularly competed for these and in other matches on ITV's wrestling coverage particularly on World of Sport. These matches were previewed in national listings magazine TVTimes which also gave Breaks further in-depth coverage.

== Early life ==
Jim Breaks was born in Bradford in 1940. His family eventually moved to nearby West Bowling, where he first trained to wrestle as an amateur at the Windmill Club. At the age of 18, he was called up for National Service, serving as a physical training instructor in the Duke of Wellington's Regiment. After his service was up, Breaks worked as a pin setter in a textile mill. He considered re-enlisting for National Service, but after a chance meeting with promoter Norman Morrell, Breaks decided to start a career in professional wrestling and trained with Bernard Murray.

== Career ==
Breaks made his debut in December 1958, losing to his mentor, Bernard Murray. After spending three years working under Joint Promotions, he moved to Dale Martin Promotions in January 1962. A year later, he returned to Joint Promotions, when in October, he won his very first championship, the British Lightweight Championship, defeating Melwyn Riss, ending Riss' reign of nearly five years. Breaks would hold the title for over three years, before losing it to Alan Miquet in February 1967. Breaks quickly rebounded a month later by winning the European Lightweight Championship, defeating Modesto Aledo. Unfortunately, he would vacate the title for unknown reasons, but regained the title for a second time in May. In November 1967, he would win the British Welterweight Championship, defeating Alan Sargeant; Sargeant would eventually regain the title from Breaks. In December 1968, Breaks regained the British Lightweight Championship for a second time, defeating Alan Miquet. Six months later, his second reign as British Lightweight Champion ended when he lost the title to Zoltan Boscik. In March 1970, after nearly three years as European Lightweight Champion, he lost the title to Bill Ross, who he and Breaks swapped the title between each other multiple times until 1974, when Breaks defeated Ross for the final time for his fifth reign as champion. In August 1971, Breaks regained the British Lightweight Championship for a third time, defeating Johnny Saint. He would swap the title back and forth with the likes of Jon Cortez, Bobby Ryan, Alan Miquet, Dynamite Kid and Steve Grey, until his final reign as champion ended in March 1984, losing to Grey. In September 1975, his fifth reign as European Lightweight Champion ended when he lost the title to Bobby Ryan. He would trade the title back and forth with Ryan and Johnny Saint, before finally losing the title in March 1981 to Jon Cortez, ending his seventh reign as champion. In 1985, he joined All-Star Wrestling. It wouldn't be until February 1985 that Breaks would regain the European Lightweight Championship for an eighth time, defeating Jackie Robinson. He would swap the title back and forth with Jon Cortez, Peter Bainbridge, Steve Grey and Kid McCoy, until his complete retirement in 1991 (He retired from active competition in 1988, but wrestled semi-actively for three years). In November 1985, he defeated Johnny Saint to win his only World Lightweight Championship, before losing it back to Saint after over a year as champion.

== Later life and death ==
Breaks once owned a pub in Wyke called the New Inn with his ex-wife Carol.

In 1989, he was a consultor on a production of the wrestling play, Trafford Tanzi And The Venus Flytrap, in Huddersfield.

In June 2020, Breaks was found not competent to stand trial for the 2017 murder of his ex-partner Donna Cowley. He died in Gran Canaria on 25 December 2023, at the age of 83.

== Championships and accomplishments ==
- British Championships
  - British Lightweight Championship (11 times)
  - British Welterweight Championship (8 times)
  - European Lightweight Championship (17 times)
  - World Lightweight Championship (1 time)
