= British Middleweight Championship =

Professional wrestling championship

The British Middleweight Championship is the Middleweight professional wrestling championship competed for throughout the British wrestling circuit.

The title was recognised as official by national TV network ITV for the purposes of their coverage of the UK wrestling scene and by its listings magazine TV Times in accompanying magazine feature coverage.

== History ==
=== Joint Promotions ===
Joint Promotions established a British Middleweight title in 1952 in compliance with the resolutions of the Mountevans Committee. By 1971, this title was in the possession of Brian Maxine who continued to claim the title without dispute in an unbroken reign until 2000. Also a successful musician, Maxine wore his championship belt on the cover of record releases.

=== The Wrestling Alliance (TWA) ===
A new version of the championship was created in 2000 for TWA which became the focus of a feud between Mal Sanders and James Mason.

Meanwhile, Maxine, wrestling for Premier Promotions, continued to wear his old championship belt but no longer laid claim to the title. A contest for the belt between Maxine and Johnny Kidd on 15 March 2003 in Midhurst was strictly billed as being only for the championship belt as a possession. Maxine would still be wearing the belt for appearances with LDN in 2007.

=== Revolution British Wrestling (RBW) ===
A new version of the championship was created out of a four-man tournament which saw Cameron Knite qualify over Jack Storm during December 2003 in Sheffield while Johnny Kidd overcame Ross Jordan in Nottingham during December as well to qualify.

The final was held in Enfield, London on 24 January 2004 and saw Johnny Kidd defeat Knite, two falls to one, to be crowned first champion.

On 22 May 2004, Jorge Castano defeated Johnny Kidd for the Championship in Hitchin, Hertfordshire, in his third attempt, following previous contests between the two in Chingford and Nottingham, and would hold the belt up to RBW's eventual closure in late 2005. Until and unless steps are taken to reorganise this championship, Castano remains as dormant champion for the rest of his professional career.

== List of champions ==
This is a history of all combined versions of the British Middleweight title.

Key

Symbol	Meaning
#	The overall championship reign
Reign	The reign number for the specific wrestler listed.
Event	The event promoted by the respective promotion in which the title changed hands
N/A	The specific information is not known
—	Used for vacated reigns in order to not count it as an official reign
[Note #]	Indicates that the exact length of the title reign is unknown, with a note providing more details.

=== British independent circuit (1938–1952) ===
No.	Champion	Reign	Date	Days held	Location	Event	Notes	Ref(s)
1	Jack Moores	1	N/A	N/A	N/A	live event	First recorded champion	
2	Billy Reilly	1	N/A	N/A	Wigan	live event		
3	Jack Dale	1	1935	N/A	London	live event	Won a tournament for the title.	
4	Robert H Cook	1	1950	N/A	London	live event	Atholl Oakeley promotions show	

=== Joint Promotions (1952–?) ===
No.	Champion	Reign	Date	Days held	Location	Event	Notes	Ref(s)
1	Tommy Mann	1	1952	N/A	N/A	live event		
2	Harry Fields	1	1952	N/A	N/A	live event		
3	Cyril Knowles	1	1954	N/A	N/A	live event		
4	Les Stent	1	1954	N/A	N/A	live event		
5	Guido Ronga	1	1956	N/A	N/A	live event		
6	Tommy Mann	2	1956	N/A	N/A	live event		
7	Harry Fields	2	1958	N/A	N/A	live event		
8	Bobby Steele	1	1958	N/A	N/A	live event		
9	Harry Fields	3	1958	N/A	N/A	live event		
10	Alan Colbeck	1	1961	N/A	N/A	live event		
11	Tommy Mann	3	May 1961	184	Leeds	live event		
12	Chic Purvey	1	December 1961	N/A	N/A	live event		
13	Tommy Mann	4	N/A	N/A	N/A	live event		
14	Chic Purvey	2	N/A	N/A	N/A	live event		
15	Tommy Mann	5	N/A	N/A	N/A	live event		
16	Chic Purvey	3	N/A	N/A	N/A	live event		
17	Tommy Mann	6	May 1963	123	N/A	live event		
18	Bobby Steele	2	October 1963	N/A	N/A	live event		
19	Tommy Mann	7	N/A	N/A	N/A	live event		
20	Bert Royal	1	26 October 1963	N/A	Manchester	live event		
21	Tommy Mann	8	1963	N/A	N/A	live event		
—	Vacated	—	1963	N/A	N/A	N/A	Championship vacated upon Tommy Mann's retirement.	
22	Bert Royal	2	26 October 1966	33	Sheffield	live event	Defeated Peter Preston for the vacant championship	
23	Clayton Thomson	1	28 November 1966	350	Nottingham	live event		
24	Mick McManus	1	13 November 1967	72	London	live event		
25	Clayton Thomson	2	24 January 1968	1,224	London	live event		
26	Brian Maxine	1	1 June 1971	10,076 (at least)	Croydon	live event	Maxine also held the British Welterweight championship at the start of his reign.	
Maxine continued to claim the title until 1999 and last wore the belt in public at a wrestling show in 2007.

=== The Wrestling Alliance (2000–2003) ===
No.	Champion	Reign	Date	Days held	Location	Event	Notes	Ref(s)
1	James Mason	1	2000	N/A	N/A	live event	Won the revived title in a tournament	
—	Vacated	—	15 June 2002	N/A	N/A	N/A	Championship vacated after Mason failed to make weight.	
2	Mal Sanders	1	18 June 2002	279	Southampton	live event	During this reign, Maxine wrestled Johnny Kidd on a Premier Promotions show but only for his old belt, not the championship	
3	Steve Grey	1	24 March 2003	N/A	Southampton	live event		
—	Vacated	—	2003	N/A	N/A	N/A	Championship vacated when the TWA closed. (Grey, in any case, was also British Lightweight Champion at the time.)	

=== RBW (2004–2005) ===
No.	Champion	Reign	Date	Days held	Location	Event	Notes	Ref(s)
1	Johnny Kidd	1	24 January 2004	119	Enfield, London	live event	Defeated Cameron Knite in a match to be crowned first champion	
2	Jorge Castano	1	22 May 2004	7,894+	Hitchin, Hertfordshire	live event		
Under Mountevans Rules, Castano is considered a dormant champion and will remain so until he retires or the championship is reactivated.

== See also ==
- Professional wrestling in the United Kingdom
