= George Kidd (wrestler) =

Scottish professional wrestler

Personal information
- Born: 1925 Dundee, Scotland
- Died: 5 January 1998 Dundee, Scotland
- Spouse: Hester MacLachlan (m. 1949)
- Children: George

Professional wrestling career
- Billed height: 5 ft 6 in (168 cm)
- Billed from: Dundee, Scotland
- Debut: 1946
- Retired: 1976

George Kidd (1925 – 5 January 1998) was a Scottish professional wrestler and television broadcaster.

== Early life ==
George Kidd was born in Dundee, Scotland, one of three brothers. He spent his childhood in the Hilltown area and attended Clepington Primary and Stobswell Secondary School. Kidd later left an apprenticeship to join the Royal Navy’s Fleet Air Arm in 1943 and served as a mechanic during World War II.

== Professional wrestling career ==
In 1946, after leaving the army, Kidd started to work as a professional wrestler. At only 5' 6", weighing in at less than 10 stone (64 kg), Kidd had the odds stacked against him. (Note: No matter the predetermined outcome of pro wrestling matches, a tall, muscular wrestler will often be considered more "marketable" to the crowd by a promoter.) Yet he was able to enjoy great success during his career by developing an elaborate, clever, and sometimes whimsical so-called ”British” style of wrestling. Kidd’s first paid match took place in 1946 at the Caird Hall in Dundee, where he was "booked" (professional wrestling term for being hired for one match) by promoter George de Relwsykow. In only a four-year span, he went on to conquer numerous championship titles, making a name for himself internationally.

In May 1947, Kidd defeated Tony Lawrence and became the Scottish Lightweight champion. (Note: After World War II, a committee was created to formulate official rules for pro wrestling events. Several promoters rallied under the Joint Promotions banner and regulations. Under what came to be known as the Admiral-Lord Mountevans rules, bouts were disputed in 5-minute falls, best of three falls, and championship titles were divided in seven weight divisions. "Lightweight" was the lightest (for wrestlers under 154lbs).)

In 1948, Kidd won the British Lightweight Title, defeating Jack Dempsey. He lost it to Alan Colbeck in November 1949.

In 1949, Kidd added the European Lightweight title to his record competing in Paris, with a reported victory over Mick McManus.

In October 1949, Kidd won the Mountevans Rules World Lightweight title after he defeated Rudi Quarez.

In February 1950, Kidd briefly lost his titles to, but regained the next month from, French wrestler René Ben Chemoul, adding Chemoul's FFCP World Lightweight Title to the crown. By 1952 he had also defeated Spanish and Belgian claimants to become undisputed World Lightweight champion (inasmuch as Kidd's was the only active version worldwide of the title). He held onto the combined title for 24 consecutive years, defending it 49 times. His title would remain undisputed until the creation of the UWA World Lightweight Championship in 1975.

Kidd was admired for his ability to counter or escape from the most intricate holds, earning himself the nickname of "the Houdini of the mat". Kidd was also a devout practitioner of Hatha Yoga, which helped him develop flexibility and mental sharpness instead of focusing only on muscle bulk, which in turn helped him defeat stronger and heavier opponents. Kidd was also a showman who knew how to focus on his in-ring skills instead of gimmicks to entertain a crowd. His technical savvy coupled with a fierce competitive spirit allowed him to out-wrestle some of the most praised names in the professional wrestling business.

On 2 March 1976, after more than 1000 matches, suffering only 7 defeats, Kidd resigned his championship and retired. During his lengthy career, Kidd wrestled 22 television matches on ITV between 1962 and 1969, ten of these from 1965 onwards on World of Sport. He returned to the "small screen" in 1975 for one singles match and one triple tag, both filmed at the same Wolverhampton Civic Hall TV taping as part of an England vs Scotland competition and screened on the 30 August 1975 edition of World of Sport. He believed that over-exposure would turn the sport he loved into a pantomime. He also trained or influenced many other accomplished pro wrestlers who would later go on to become major stars on British television’s World of Sport era, including long-lasting lightweight champion Johnny Saint who first won the title in 1976 to fill the vacancy caused by Kidd's retirement.

On 7 August 2015, George Kidd became the first entrant into The Professional Wrestling Hall of Fame for Scotland, founded by wrestling historian Bradley Craig. He was inducted by Lost Provost Bob Duncan at a special ceremony at Caird Hall, which was also attended by former wrestler and Aberdeen councillor Len Ironside. A memorial plaque honouring Kidd was also placed on permanent display in the venue.

== Broadcasting career ==
Kidd also worked for Grampian Television, which started transmitting in 1961. He hosted The Wednesday People and The George Kidd Show as well as Ask George Kidd. In 1965, viewers voted him Grampian Television Personality of the Year.

== Personal life ==
On 8 June 1949, George married Hester MacLachlan in Dundee.

Kidd owned a series of pubs in his hometown, including the Ellenbank Bar in Alexander Street.

In 1965 Kidd he was awarded the Dundee’s ‘‘First Citizen’’ title.

George Kidd died on 5 January 1998. He had moved to Lawrence Street in the Broughty Ferry suburb of Dundee. His wife Hester had already died before him. He was survived by a son.

== Championships and accomplishments ==
- Wrestling Observer Newsletter
  - Wrestling Observer Newsletter Hall of Fame (2023)
