= Johnny Saint =

British professional wrestler

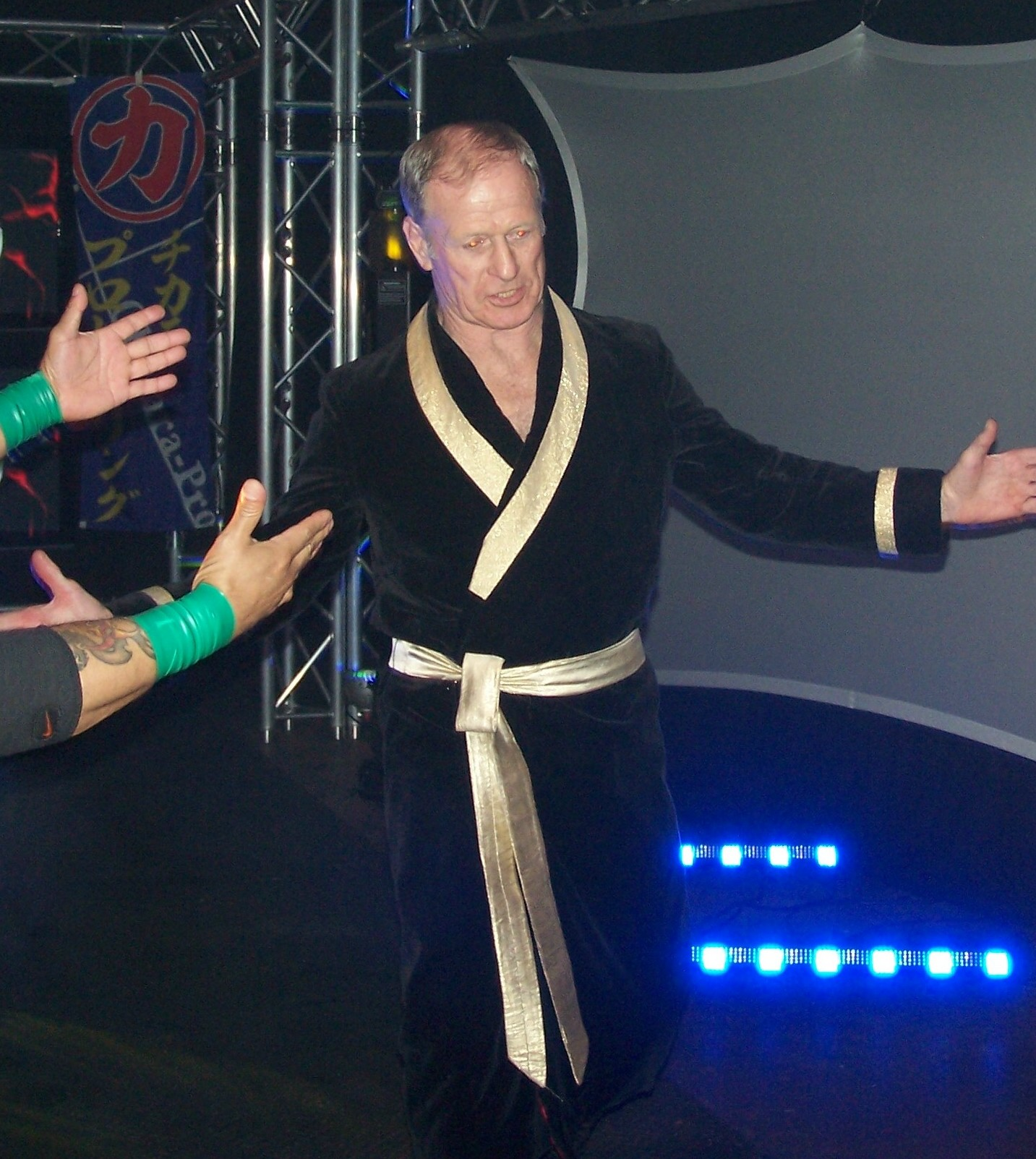
- Saint in 2009

Personal information
- Born: John Miller; 29 June 1941 (age 85) Failsworth, England

Professional wrestling career
- Ring name: Johnny Saint
- Billed height: 5 ft 8 in (1.73 m)
- Billed weight: 154 lb (70 kg)
- Billed from: Blackpool, England
- Trained by: Billy Robinson; Colin McDonald; George Kidd
- Debut: 1958
- Retired: 2015

John Miller (born 29 June 1941), better known by his ring name Johnny Saint, is an English retired professional wrestler. Renowned for his technical wrestling ability, he gained prominence in the British wrestling scene during the mid-to-late 20th century, particularly through his appearances on World of Sport.

Over the course of his career, Saint held the World Lightweight Championship a record ten times, along with multiple reigns as British and European Lightweight Champion. He competed internationally, including later appearances in the United States and Japan. Following his in-ring retirement, he worked as a trainer and served as the general manager of WWE’s now-defunct NXT UK brand from 2018 until its closure in 2022. In 2024, he was inducted into the Wrestling Observer Newsletter Hall of Fame.

== Early career ==
John Miller was born in Failsworth on 29 June 1941. After finishing school at the age of 15, he followed in his father's footsteps and became a factory worker. By this time, he was already an amateur boxer. One day, his mother went to the hair salon, where she had her hair cut by Billy Robinson's mother; they became friends and introduced their sons to each other, with Miller soon beginning to train at Robinson's father's gym. He trained as a wrestler under Robinson, Colin McDonald, and George Kidd.

== Career ==
Under the Johnny Saint ring name, Miller debuted as a professional wrestler in June 1958, being defeated by Colin McDonald. In May 1971 he won the British Lightweight Championship from Zoltan Boscik but lost it to Jim Breaks in August that year. On 5 May 1973, he wrestled Breaks for the title, but lost in the fifth round due to referee stoppage after a cut on his forehead. On 3 November 1976, he won his first World Lightweight title, winning a tournament after the title was vacated by Saint's mentor George Kidd upon retirement. He would be featured on the British show World of Sport, though his technique-focused attitude to wrestling and strait-laced persona ensured he was underrated in America, which preferred larger-than-life characters.

Saint briefly lost the title and regained it from Steve Grey in 1979, Jackie Robinson in 1984, Breaks and Jon Cortez several times in 1985 and 1986, Mike "Flash" Jordan once in 1987-1988 and Grey again in 1992–1993. He also had two European Lightweight Championship reigns in 1979 and 1983. On 10 October 1996, Saint defeated Naohiro Hoshikawa at a Michinoku Pro Wrestling event in what was billed as Saint's retirement match. but he continued to wrestle the occasional match and did not vacate the World Lightweight Championship until 2001 - it has remained vacant since that point.

On 27 November 2007, more than a decade after his retirement, Saint returned to the ring for LDN Wrestling to defeat Johnny Kidd. He wrestled a further eight matches for LDN, including two bouts against three-time LDN British Heavyweight Champion "Gentleman" Jon Ritchie, in which Saint put up a considerable fight before being defeated. He was defeated by Mike Quackenbush at Chikara's Tag World Grand Prix in 2008, losing by knockout when he did not get up from the referee's 10-count after he suffered a knee injury while performing a knee breaker.

Saint made his true American debut at Chikara's King of Trios Tournament on 27 March 2009, with Quackenbush and Jorge "Skayde" Rivera in "The Masters of a Thousand Holds" team. They would win their opening round match against Incoherence (Delirious, Hallowicked, and Frightmare) but lost their quarter-final round match against Team Uppercut (Bryan Danielson, Claudio Castagnoli, and Dave Taylor). Saint returned to Chikara on 30 July 2011, losing to Johnny Kidd in a match contested under World of Sport rules. The following day, Saint teamed with Quackenbush to defeat the team of Kidd and Colt Cabana, with Saint pinning Kidd.

Saint wrestled his last match In Italy in 2015. In March 2016, he began working as a guest trainer for WWE in their Performance Center. The following December, he announced that he was starting a six-month stint as a trainer for WWE. On 7 June 2018, it was announced that he would be the general manager of the UK division of its NXT brand. He would remain as general manager until the brand's closure in September 2022.

On 24 August 2025, Saint made an appearance for All Elite Wrestling (AEW) as part of their Forbidden Door event at the O2 Arena in London, England. He was part of pre-recorded segment alongside British wrestler and commentator Nigel McGuinness who was challenging fellow British wrestler Zack Sabre Jr for the IWGP World Heavyweight Championship as part of AEW's working relationship with New Japan Pro Wrestling. During the match, Saint also appeared at ringside with former World Mid-Heavyweight and British Light Heavyweight Champion Marty Jones.

== Professional wrestling style and persona ==
Saint's nickname "The Man of a Thousand Holds" came from his largely submission based grappling style, frequently using wrist locks, roll-up pins, and bridges to counter his opponents' offence. He would also utilise a lady of the lake hold as his finishing move.

== Personal life ==
Miller resides in the Welsh town of Rhyl.

== Championships and accomplishments ==
- British Championships
  - British Lightweight Championship (1 time)
  - European Lightweight Championship (2 times)
  - World Lightweight Championship (10 times)
- Wrestling Observer Newsletter
  - Wrestling Observer Newsletter Hall of Fame (2024)
