= Jorge Castaño =

Colombian professional wrestler

Personal information
- Born: Jorge Castaño; September 28, 1981 (age 44) Cali, Colombia

Professional wrestling career
- Ring name(s): Jorge Castaño; George Castaño; Giorgio Castaño
- Billed height: 5 ft 7 in (170 cm)
- Billed weight: 198 lb (90 kg)
- Billed from: Cali, Colombia
- Trained by: NWA UK Hammerlock staff
- Debut: 1997

Jorge Castaño (born September 28, 1981) is a Colombian professional wrestler who works for many promotions in the United Kingdom. He is the most recent claimant to date of the British Middleweight title. He is also a former UKPW World Champion.

== Early life ==
Jorge Castaño was born in the Cali, Colombia and gained an interest in wrestling at a very early age. Once Jorge reached ten years of age, he and his family moved to the United Kingdom. By the age of thirteen, Castaño was involved in amateur Olympic-style wrestling. In order to train, Castaño had to take part in strenuous training exercises, including running and weightlifting. Upon completion of training, Castaño would later win numerous trophies of amateur wrestling, including the 1995, Amateur British Championship in the 65 kg category.

Castaño was soon offered an amateur wrestling scholarship in the U.S. but unfortunately he was under sixteen years of age, which meant by law he could not accept it. Instead, Castaño remained in the UK and took up professional wrestling in 1996. His training took place at NWA UK Hammerlock, the UK affiliated branch of the National Wrestling Alliance. In 1997, Jorge made his professional wrestling debut in Kent, England as part of a tag team contest.

== Career ==
Only one year later, Castaño left NWA UK Hammerlock and began wrestling in numerous UK wrestling promotions, including The Wrestling Alliance, All Star Wrestling, the Frontier Wrestling Alliance, the World Association of Wrestling, Rumble Promotions and many others while steadily improving his in-ring abilities as well.

In 1999, Castaño appeared in the Ultimate Wrestling Alliance for three matches at the Pain at the Pleasure Beach television tapings for the cable channel L!VE TV, giving him experience in front of a televised audience. While working with the UWA, Castaño soon began training his younger brother Alex, who made his debut shortly afterwards. On September 9, in FWA Reckless Abandon He faced Mark Sloan for the FWA British Heavyweight Championship but was defeated by disqualification.

On March 23, 2000, Castaño was part of the FWA British Tag Team Championships Tournament Final Match with Scottie Rock as his tag team partner, in a failed attempt against The New Breed (Ashe & Curve). On August 5, Castaño participated for the vacant FWA British Heavyweight Championship Tournament, where Justin Richards were crowned as new champion.

In 2001, the two formed a tag team known as The Colombian Connection, later changed to La Familia. They won the FWA Tag Team Championships from The New Breed at an event in Portsmouth, Hampshire on June 19. They would hold the titles for over two and half months before losing the titles back to The New Breed on September 1 in Harrow, Middlesex.

After the title loss, Castaño made his debut for Revolution British Wrestling in September 2002 and began focusing on his singles career after first defeating his brother Alex in Nottingham in what was Alex's final professional match. Castaño soon became a trainer as well as a full-time wrestler for RBW. Castaño soon went on to defeat Johnny Kidd for the RBW British Middleweight Championship on May 22, 2004 in Hitchin, Hertfordshire. Castaño retained the title until the promotion's closure in late 2005.

Castaño would continue to compete in various independent promotions, including 1 Pro Wrestling, before returning to the Frontier Wrestling Alliance. He also helped the promotion in its "Civil War" against the IPW:UK.

On October 22, 2006, in IPW:UK Extreme Measures 3, Castaño was part of the Extreme Measures Tournament Final No Rules Four Way Dance, along with Leroy Kincaid, Aviv Maayan and Pac, which was finally won by Leroy Kincaid.

On December 2, 2014, Castaño took part in Athletic Club Wrestling promotion, based in Germany, on ACW Universe Brawl, where participated in a tournament for the ACW German Championship. In semifinals, he defeated Dean Jazzman thanks to the interference of Steve Morocco. Later, in finale match, he defeated "The Prodigy" Denko, in this case by the interference of Boombastic, becoming the ACW German Champion. Immediately, BAM's music sounded and then cashed his title ticket for the ACW German Championship and then he defeated Castaño and snatching the title.

On November 21, 2015, Castaño competed for United Kingdom Pro Wrestling promotion, on UKPW Showcase, which took place at Medway Park, Gillingham, Kent, where he defeated James Mason to win the UKPW World Championship for the first time.

== Outside of wrestling ==
Castaño has a drama school background, and looks to do more acting in the future. Castaño is also a qualified gym instructor and lifeguard.

== Championships and accomplishments ==
=== Amateur wrestling ===
- 65 kg Amateur British Champion (1995)

=== Professional wrestling ===
- Athletic Club Wrestling

- ACW German Championship (1 time)

- Frontier Wrestling Alliance

- FWA Tag Team Championship (1 time) - with Alex Castaño

- Revolution British Wrestling

- RBW British Middleweight Championship (1 time)

- United Kingdom Pro Wrestling

- UKPW World Championship (1 time)
