= Weight class =

Divisions to match sizes of opponents

Weight classes are divisions of competition used to match competitors against others of their own size. Weight classes are used in a variety of sports including rowing, weight lifting, and especially combat sports such as boxing, kickboxing, mixed martial arts, wrestling, and Brazilian jiu-jitsu. Alternatives to formal weight classes include catch weight and openweight.

The existence of weight divisions gives rise to the practice of weight cutting. To be the largest individual in a weight division is perceived as advantageous; therefore many athletes lose weight through dieting and dehydration prior to weigh-ins to qualify for a lower weight class.

== Comparison ==
Below are selected maximum weight limits for the major classes in different sports.

Divisions	Boxing	MMA	Kickboxing (ONE)	BJJ	Judo
Heavyweight	None	120.0 kg (264.6 lb)	120.2 kg (265.0 lb)	94.3 kg (207.9 lb)	
Light heavyweight	79.4 kg (175.0 lb)	93.0 kg (205.0 lb)	102.1 kg (225.1 lb)	88.5 kg (195.1 lb)	100 kg (220.5 lb) (half-heavyweight)
Middleweight	72.6 kg (160.1 lb)	83.9 kg (185.0 lb)	93.0 kg (205.0 lb)	82.3 kg (181.4 lb)	90 kg (198.4 lb)
Welterweight	66.7 kg (147.0 lb)	77.1 kg (170.0 lb)	83.9 kg (185.0 lb)		
Lightweight	61.2 kg (134.9 lb)	70.3 kg (155.0 lb)	77.1 kg (170.0 lb)	76 kg (167.6 lb)	73 kg (160.9 lb)
Featherweight	57.2 kg (126.1 lb)	65.8 kg (145.1 lb)	70.3 kg (155.0 lb)	70 kg (154.3 lb)	
Bantamweight	53.5 kg (117.9 lb)	61.2 kg (134.9 lb)	65.8 kg (145.1 lb)	57.5 kg (126.8 lb)	
Flyweight	50.8 kg (112.0 lb)	56.7 kg (125.0 lb)	61.2 kg (134.9 lb)		

== See also ==
- Brazilian jiu-jitsu weight classes
- Boxing weight classes
- Judo weight classes
- Kickboxing weight classes
- Mixed martial arts weight classes
- Professional wrestling weight classes
- Taekwondo weight classes
- Wrestling weight classes
