= Wrestling weight classes =

In most styles of wrestling, opponents are matched based on weight class.

== Olympic and international weight classes ==
In international competition, men's freestyle wrestling, men's Greco-Roman wrestling, and female wrestling utilize the following weight classes as of 2018:

=== Men's freestyle wrestling ===
- 57 kg (125 lbs)
- 61 kg (134 lbs) (non-Olympic class)
- 65 kg (143 lbs)
- 70 kg (154 lbs) (non-Olympic class)
- 74 kg (163 lbs)
- 79 kg (174 lbs) (non-Olympic class)
- 86 kg (190 lbs)
- 92 kg (203 lbs) (non-Olympic class)
- 97 kg (214 lbs)
- 125 kg (276 lbs)

=== Men's Greco-Roman Wrestling ===
- 55 kg (121 lbs) (non-Olympic class)
- 60 kg (132 lbs)
- 63 kg (139 lbs) (non-Olympic class)
- 67 kg (148 lbs)
- 72 kg (159 lbs) (non-Olympic class)
- 77 kg (170 lbs)
- 82 kg (181 lbs) (non-Olympic class)
- 87 kg (192 lbs)
- 97 kg (214 lbs)
- 100kg+ (228lbs+)

=== Women's wrestling ===
- 50 kg (110 lbs)
- 53 kg (117 lbs)
- 55 kg (121 lbs) (non-Olympic class)
- 57 kg (126 lbs)
- 59 kg (130 lbs) (non-Olympic class)
- 62 kg (137 lbs)
- 65 kg (143 lbs) (non-Olympic class)
- 68 kg (150 lbs)
- 72 kg (159 lbs) (non-Olympic class)
- 76 kg (168 lbs)
- 76 kg (168 lbs) (Gracious class)

== International youth weight classes ==
=== For men's freestyle and Greco-Roman wrestling ===
As of 2019, international freestyle wrestling and Greco-Roman wrestling for male youths are divided into three age categories: U15, cadets, and juniors.

U15 (male youths aged 14–15, as well as male youths at age 13 with a medical certificate and parental authorization) compete in freestyle and/or Greco-Roman wrestling in the following 10 weight classes:

- 34–38 kg (75-84 lbs)
- 41 kg (90 lbs)
- 44 kg (97 lbs)
- 48 kg (106 lbs)
- 52 kg (115 lbs)
- 57 kg (126 lbs)
- 62 kg (137 lbs)
- 68 kg (150 lbs)
- 75 kg (165 lbs)
- 85 kg (187 lbs)

Cadets (male youths aged 16–17, as well as male youths at age 15 with a medical certificate and parental authorization) compete in freestyle wrestling and/or Greco-Roman wrestling in the following 10 weight classes:

- 41 to 45 kg (90 to 99 lbs)
- 48 kg (106 lbs)
- 51 kg (112 lbs)
- 55 kg (121 lbs)
- 60 kg (132 lbs)
- 65 kg (143 lbs)
- 71 kg (157 lbs)
- 80 kg (176 lbs)
- 92 kg (203 lbs)
- 110 kg (243 lbs)

Juniors (men aged 18 to 20, as well as male youths at age 17 with a medical certificate and parental authorization) compete in freestyle wrestling and/or Greco-Roman wrestling in the following weight classes:

- 57 kg (126 lbs)
- 61 kg (134 lbs)
- 65 kg (143 lbs)
- 70 kg (154 lbs)
- 74 kg (163 lbs)
- 79 kg (174 lbs)
- 86 kg (190 lbs)
- 92 kg (203 lbs)
- 97 kg (214 lbs)
- 125 kg (276 lbs)

Juniors over the age of 18 are allowed to participate in senior competitions with a medical certificate.

=== For women's freestyle wrestling ===
As of 2019, female youth compete in freestyle wrestling on an international level in one of four age categories: U15, cadets, and juniors.

U15 (female youths aged 14–15, and female youths at age 13 with a medical certificate and parental authorization) compete in freestyle wrestling in the following 10 weight classes:

- 29 to 33 kg (64 to 73 lbs)
- 36 kg (79 lbs)
- 39 kg (86 lbs)
- 42 kg (93 lbs)
- 46 kg (101 lbs)
- 50 kg (110 lbs)
- 54 kg (119 lbs)
- 58 kg (128 lbs)
- 62 kg (137 lbs)
- 66 kg (146 lbs)

Cadets (female youths aged 16–17, and female youths at age 15 with a medical certificate and parental authorization) compete in freestyle wrestling in the following 10 weight classes:

- 36 to 40 kg (79 to 88 lbs)
- 43 kg (95 lbs)
- 46 kg (101 lbs)
- 49 kg (108 lbs)
- 53 kg (117 lbs)
- 57 kg (126 lbs)
- 61 kg (134 lbs)
- 65 kg (143 lbs)
- 69 kg (152 lbs)
- 73 kg (161 lbs)

Junior (female youths aged 18 to 20, and female youths at age 17 with a medical certificate and parental authorization) compete in freestyle wrestling in the following eight weight classes:

- 50 kg (110 lbs)
- 53 kg (117 lbs)
- 55 kg (121 lbs)
- 57 kg (126 lbs)
- 59 kg (130 lbs)
- 62 kg (137 lbs)
- 65 kg (143 lbs)
- 68 kg (150 lbs)
- 72 kg (159 lbs)
- 76 kg (168 lbs)

== Scholastic weight classes in the United States ==
=== Elementary school ===
Elementary school students competing in wrestling have multiple ways weight classes are determined.

1. "Madison system" - This is a popular tournament format where there are no weight classes and the tournament director pairs wrestlers into brackets (usually 8 or 16 man) based on weight at weigh-ins. This is a popular method because it discourages "weight cutting" in young athletes.
2. Division-based system - In this system, the tournament director separates athletes by age (ex: Grade 2 and under, Grade 4 and under, and Grade 6 and under), and by weight class. Weight class and division is at the tournament director's discretion.
3. Pure-weight based system - In this system, the athletes are not divided by age but rather just by weight class. This is rarely used because it pairs younger, less experienced athletes with older, more experienced athletes.

=== Middle school ===
Wrestling weight classes for middle (junior high) school in the United States vary from state to state and are not regulated by the National Federation of State High School Associations (NFHS). The weight classes regulated by the Ohio High School Athletic Association (OHSAA) are the following:

- 80 lbs
- 86 lbs
- 92 lbs
- 98 lbs
- 104 lbs
- 110 lbs
- 116 lbs
- 122 lbs
- 128 lbs
- 134 lbs
- 142 lbs
- 150 lbs
- 160 lbs
- 172 lbs
- 205 lbs
- 245 lbs

=== High school ===
==== Beginning 2023-2024 season ====
As of the 2023-2024 season, each state must select one of three sets of weight classes (12, 13, or 14 weight classes) provided by the National Federation of State High School Associations (NFHS) for high school competition in the United States, one for boys competition (which includes girls wrestling boys) and another for girls competition.

===== Boys competition weight classes =====
If a state chooses to use twelve weight classes for boys competition, the weight classes are as follows:

- 108 lbs
- 116 lbs
- 124 lbs
- 131 lbs
- 138 lbs
- 145 lbs
- 152 lbs
- 160 lbs
- 170 lbs
- 190 lbs
- 215 lbs
- 285 lbs

If a state chooses to use thirteen weight classes for boys competition, the weight classes are as follows:

- 107 lbs
- 114 lbs
- 121 lbs
- 127 lbs
- 133 lbs
- 139 lbs
- 145 lbs
- 152 lbs
- 160 lbs
- 172 lbs
- 189 lbs
- 215 lbs
- 285 lbs

If a state chooses to use fourteen weight classes for boys competition, the weight classes are as follows:

- 106 lbs
- 113 lbs
- 120 lbs
- 126 lbs
- 132 lbs
- 138 lbs
- 144 lbs
- 150 lbs
- 157 lbs
- 165 lbs
- 175 lbs
- 190 lbs
- 215 lbs
- 285 lbs

===== Girls competition weight classes =====
If a state chooses to use twelve weight classes for girls competition, the weight classes are as follows:

- 100 lbs
- 107 lbs
- 114 lbs
- 120 lbs
- 126 lbs
- 132 lbs
- 138 lbs
- 145 lbs
- 152 lbs
- 165 lbs
- 185 lbs
- 235 lbs

If a state chooses to use thirteen weight classes for girls competition, the weight classes are as follows:

- 100 lbs
- 106 lbs
- 112 lbs
- 118 lbs
- 124 lbs
- 130 lbs
- 136 lbs
- 142 lbs
- 148 lbs
- 155 lbs
- 170 lbs
- 190 lbs
- 235 lbs

If a state chooses to use fourteen weight classes for girls competition, the weight classes are as follows:

- 100 lbs
- 105 lbs
- 110 lbs
- 115 lbs
- 120 lbs
- 125 lbs
- 130 lbs
- 135 lbs
- 140 lbs
- 145 lbs
- 150 lbs
- 155 lbs
- 170 lbs
- 190 lbs
- 235 lbs

===== Exceptions =====
In boys' wrestling, New York uses a modified 13 weight class set, that uses the same weight classes of the 12 weight class set with the addition of a 101 pound weight class.

==== Before 2023-2024 season ====
Prior to the 2023-2024 wrestling season high school students in the United States competing in scholastic wrestling did so in the following 14 weight classes set by the National Federation of State High School Associations (NFHS):

- 106 lbs
- 113 lbs
- 120 lbs
- 126 lbs
- 132 lbs
- 138 lbs
- 145 lbs
- 152 lbs
- 160 lbs
- 170 lbs
- 182 lbs
- 195 lbs
- 220 lbs
- 285 lbs
  - Heavyweight class was unlimited before 1988–89; capped at 275 lb from 1988–89 through 2005–06.

Other states had additional or modified weight classes, such as:

- 99 lbs (in the state of New York;)
- 98 lbs (in the state of Montana;)
- 105 lbs (in place of the 103 lbs weight class) in Montana.
- 144, 150, 157, 165, 175, 190, and 215 lbs (in place of 145, 152, 160, 170, 195, and 220 lbs weight classes) in New Jersey.
- 172, 189 and 215 lbs (in place of the 170, 182, 195 and 220 lbs weight classes) in Pennsylvania.
- 103, 112, 119, 125, 130, 135, 140, 145, 152, 160, 171, 189, 215 and 285 are the weight classes used in Michigan.
- 106 lbs/48 kg, 113 lbs/51 kg, 120 lbs/54 kg, 126 lbs/57 kg, 132 lbs/59.87 kg, 138 lbs/62.59 kg, 144 lbs/65 kg, 150 lbs/68 kg, 157 lbs/71 kg, 165 lbs/74.84 kg, 175 lbs/79 kg, 190 lbs/86 kg, 215 lbs/97.52 kg and 285 lbs/129 kg are the weight classes used in Kansas.

== Collegiate weight classes in the United States ==
College and university students in the United States competing in collegiate wrestling do so in the following 10 weight classes set by the National Collegiate Athletic Association (NCAA):

- 125 lb
- 133 lb
- 141 lb
- 149 lb
- 157 lb
- 165 lb
- 174 lb
- 184 lb
- 197 lb
- Heavyweight (183 lb to 285 lb)

Also:

- 235 lb (Only the National Collegiate Wrestling Association (NCWA), which governs institutions outside of the NCAA, NAIA, and NJCAA, currently allows this weight class, which ranges from 174 lb to 235 lb.)

The NCWA has also approved the following eight weight classes for its women's division, which uses collegiate rules instead of the freestyle ruleset used in NCAA-recognized women's wrestling:

- 105 lb
- 112 lb
- 121 lb
- 130 lb
- 139 lb
- 148 lb
- 159 lb
- 200 lb

Women's college wrestling is also governed by the Women's Collegiate Wrestling Association (WCWA), an arm of the National Wrestling Coaches Association (NWCA). The WCWA uses freestyle rules instead of collegiate rules. Freestyle wrestling became an NCAA-recognized sport as part of the Emerging Sports for Women program in 2020–21. The WCWA currently has 10 weight classes:

- 101 lb
- 109 lb
- 116 lb
- 123 lb
- 130 lb
- 136 lb
- 143 lb
- 155 lb
- 170 lb
- 191 lb

== See also ==
- Brazilian Jiu-Jitsu weight classes
- Boxing weight classes
- Kickboxing weight classes
- Mixed martial arts weight classes
- Taekwondo weight classes
- Professional wrestling weight classes
