= Mick McManus (wrestler) =

British professional wrestler (1920–2013)

Personal information
- Born: William George Matthews; 11 January 1920 Camberwell, London, England
- Died: 22 May 2013 (aged 93) Brinsworth House, Twickenham, Richmond

Professional wrestling career
- Billed height: 5 ft 6 in (168 cm)
- Billed weight: 12 st 7 lb/175 lb (79 kg)
- Trained by: John Ruskin Amateur Wrestling Club
- Debut: 1947
- Retired: 1982

Mick McManus (born William George Matthews; 11 January 1920 – 22 May 2013) was an English professional wrestler. The role he played was noted as a heel European wrestler and often went by the nicknames "The Man You Love to Hate", "Rugged South London Tough Guy" and "The Dulwich Destroyer".

== Early life ==
McManus was born in Camberwell, south London. After leaving school he worked in a drawing office and then for a firm of printers. He began training as a wrestler, and during the Second World War helped teach Royal Air Force personnel in the sport. His first professional performance took place in 1945, while on a posting to Australia.

== Wrestling career ==
McManus was one of the most notorious heels in British wrestling history. Like Mark Rocco and Kendo Nagasaki, he bent the rules as far as they could go without being disqualified, much to the fury of the crowd. He was also well known for using short range forearm jabs in matches. He became famous for his trademark black trunks and cropped black hair and for his dislike of having his cauliflowered ears attacked by opponents, resulting in the catchphrase "Not the ears, not the ears".

McManus made more television appearances than any other wrestler in a career which spanned more than 20 years. Losing to Peter Preston by disqualification during his later years, he lost the European Middleweight title on television to a younger wrestler Mal Sanders.

McManus won his first wrestling title, the British Welterweight Championship, in 1949 by defeating Eddie Capelli for the vacant championship. He dropped the title to Jack Dempsey in 1957 but regained it from Dempsey. He dropped the title to him the following year, however. His 1963 bout against Jackie Pallo was watched by over 20 million people on British television. On 13 November 1967, McManus won the British Middleweight Championship with a victory over Clayton Thomson. Thomson regained the title in a rematch two months later. McManus also won the European Middleweight Championship in June 1968 by defeating Vic Faulkner. Faulkner regained the title belt in September, but McManus won it back in April 1971. He held the championship for almost seven years before losing it to Mal Sanders. McManus and Sanders traded the belt back and forth in matches that year and into the following year, with McManus holding the title a total of four times.

Concurrently with his career in the wrestling ring, McManus ran the London office of professional wrestling promotion firm Dale Martin as a booker, determining the matches and their results.

== Later life ==
After McManus retired from active wrestling in 1982, he advised London Weekend Television, until professional wrestling was taken off the air in 1988. He later worked in public relations, owned The Royal Hotel pub (closed in 2009) in Stoughton, Guildford, Surrey, and became a connoisseur of antique porcelain. He also continued to advise professional wrestling promoters.

== Personal life and death ==
McManus was married to Barbara, who predeceased him (in January 2013); they had one son, Tony.

Joe D'Orazio, president of the British Wrestlers Reunion, said:

I am deeply saddened to announce the death of the legend that was Mick McManus, who passed away at 1am this morning. Mick never recovered from the loss of his beloved wife Barbara and lost the will to live, despite the loving care of the nurses at the celebrity home for retired actors Brinsworth House where he lived out his final days. Even the arrival of his old friend Lord Attenborough recently, failed to lift his spirits, refusing all food and drink until he quietly slipped into a coma three days ago.

He was 93.

In his prime, McManus went by the names of "The Man You Love To Hate" and "Rugged South London Tough Guy". The Sun, the newspaper in which he wrote a weekly column, commented that McManus had made more televised wrestling appearances than any other British wrestler, in a televised career that spanned 26 years.

== In popular culture ==
McManus also appeared as part of the European version of the Legends of Wrestling II video game. British pop artist Peter Blake often cites McManus as a major influence on his 'wrestlers' series of paintings due to his admiration of his wrestling persona; Blake famously painted Kendo Nagasaki's portrait as part of the series.

McManus is alluded to in Morecambe and Wise's Mastermind" sketch, which ends with Ernie Wise getting quizmaster Magnus Magnusson's name wrong and saying "This is a rotten game, Mr. McManus. I'll never watch you wrestle again!" He was also compared to English author Jilly Cooper, by a reviewer of her book Jolly Super Too, citing an opinion that they were both figures the public loved to hate.

== Championships and accomplishments ==
- British Middleweight Championship (once)
- British Welterweight Championship (2 times)
- European Middleweight Championship (4 times)
- Wrestling Observer Newsletter Hall of Fame (Class of 2012)
