= CMLL World Light Heavyweight Championship =

Professional wrestling championship

CMLL World Light Heavyweight Championships
- The CMLL World Light Heavyweight Championship belt

Details
- Promotion: Consejo Mundial de Lucha Libre
- Date established: September 26, 1991 (Note: Duncan & Will (2000) p. 395: "Jerry Estrada 1991/09/26 Cuernavaca Defeats Pierroth Jr. in final of 16-man tournament.")
- Current champion: Místico
- Date won: September 19, 2025
Statistics
- First champion: Jerry Estrada
- Most reigns: Dr. Wagner Jr. (2 times); Atlantis (2 times)
- Longest reign: Niebla Roja (1,861 days)
- Shortest reign: MJF (49 days)
- Oldest champion: Villano III (47 years, 244 days)
- Youngest champion: Rush (23 years, 146 days)
- Heaviest champion: MJF (102 kg (225 lb))
- Lightest champion: Místico (82 kg (181 lb))

The CMLL World Light Heavyweight Championship (Campeonato Mundial de Peso Semicompleto del CMLL in Spanish) is a professional wrestling world light heavyweight championship promoted by Consejo Mundial de Lucha Libre (CMLL) since 1991. As it is a professional wrestling championship, it is not won via legitimate competition; it is instead won via a scripted ending to a match or on occasion awarded to a wrestler because of a storyline. The official definition of the light heavyweight division in Mexico is between 92 kg (203 lb) and 97 kg (214 lb), but the weight limits are not always strictly adhered to. Because CMLL puts more emphasis on the lower weight classes, this division is traditionally considered more important than the heavyweight division, which is considered the most important championship by most promotions outside Mexico. The current champion is Místico, who is in his first reign. He defeated MJF in a Title vs. Mask match at the CMLL 92nd Anniversary Show on September 19, 2025. He is the 20th overall champion and the 18th wrestler to officially hold the championship. The title has been vacated twice since its creation in 1991, and has had one unofficial reign.

== History ==
The Mexican professional wrestling promotion Empresa Mexicana de Lucha Libre (EMLL; "Mexican Wrestling Enterprise") was founded in 1933 and initially recognized a series of "Mexican National" wrestling championships, endorsed by the Comisión de Box y Lucha Libre Mexico D.F. (Mexico City Boxing and Wrestling Commission). The Mexican National Light Heavyweight Championship was created in 1942 as EMLL began promoting matches for that championship with the approval and oversight of the wrestling commission. (Note: Duncan & Will (2000) p. 393: Chapter: Comision de Box y Lucha Libre Mexico D.F. National Light Heavyweight Title, "Black Guzman 1943/03") In the 1950s EMLL became a member of the National Wrestling Alliance (NWA) and began promoting the NWA World Light Heavyweight Championship in the late 1950s. Previously that championship had been promoted in the US, but the NWA gave EMLL full control of the championship in 1958, positioning the NWA title as the highest-ranking title in the light heavyweight division. (Note: Hornbaker (2006) p. 305: "EMLL was a member of the NWA from 1952 to 1986, and Lutteroth controlled the Alliance world light heavyweight, middleweight and welterweight titles.")

EMLL left the NWA In the late 1980s, and later rebranded themselves as "Consejo Mundal de Lucha Libre" (CMLL; "World Wrestling Council"). In 1991 CMLL decided to create a series of CMLL-branded world championships, with the CMLL World Light Heavyweight Championship (Campeonato Mundial Semicompleto de CMLL in Spanish) created as the second CMLL-branded championship, after the CMLL World Heavyweight Championship. (Note: Duncan & Will (2000) p. 395: "Konnan el Barbaro 1991/06/09 Mexico City Defeats Cien Caras in tournament final.") Jerry Estrada was chosen as the first champion, with CMLL booking the tournament for the championship to end with Estrada defeating Pierroth Jr. In 1996 the then-champion Dr. Wagner Jr. lost the championship to Aquarius on a show in Japan, but the title change was not approved by CMLL and thus was never officially recognized. Dr. Wagner Jr. won the title back eight days later before returning to Mexico. (Note: Duncan & Will (2000) p. 395: "Aquarius (Yoshihiro Tajiri) # 1996/07/19 Tokyo, JPN / Dr. Wagner Jr. # 1996/07/27 Sapporo, JPN - Title changes in Japan take place without approval of EMLL.") Since the title change was not officially recognized, CMLL considers Dr. Wagner Jr. a two-time champion, not a three-time champion.

On January 15, 2013, then-reigning champion Rush voluntarily gave up the CMLL World Light Heavyweight Championship as part of his ongoing storyline feud with then-CMLL World Heavyweight Champion El Terrible. As part of the storyline, El Terrible stated that he would not defend against someone who represented a lower weight class, so Rush moved into the Heavyweight division for a title match. (Note: Medio Tiempo (January 16, 2013): "Rush decidió renunciar al Campeonato Semicompleto del CMLL para contender por el Completo que ostenta su polémico rivla." ("Rush has decided to relinquish the CMLL Light Heavyweight Championship to contend for the Heavyweight championship held by his controversial rival.")) CMLL held a 16-man torneo cibernetico elimination match to determine which two wrestlers should compete in the finals for the vacant title. On January 29, 2013, Rey Escorpión defeated Volador Jr. in the tournament finals to become the 13th overall champion.

On April 8, 2016 La Máscara won the CMLL World Light Heavyweight Champion by defeating Ángel de Oro. (Note: Medio Tiempo (April 9, 2016) "La Máscara se convirtió en nuevo campeón semicompleto del Consejo Mundial de Lucha Libre" ("La Máscara became the new CMLL World Light Heavyweight Champion")) On May 22, 2017, La Máscara was fired by CMLL and the championship was vacated. (Note: CMLL (2017): "De la misma manera se da a conocer que los luchadores Máximo, La Máscara y Bobby Villa han dejado de pertenecer a esta empresa, quedando vacantes los cinturones que los dos primeros ostentaban" ("At the same time they announced that wrestlers Máximo, La Máscara and Bobby Villa no longer work for the company, leaving the championships, held by the first two mentioned, vacant")) On June 10, 2017 Niebla Roja won the championship by outlasting 9 other wrestlers, Bárbaro Cavernario, Blue Panther, Carístico, Drone, Johnny Idol, Misterioso Jr., Pólvora, Reapper and Stuka Jr., in a 10-man torneo cibernetico elimination match.

== Reigns ==
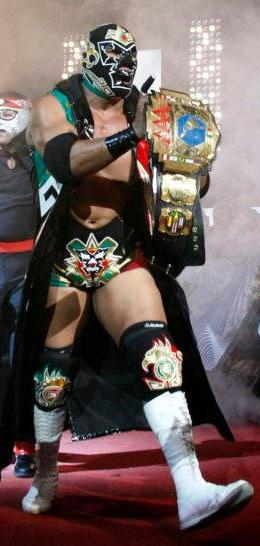
Dr. Wagner Jr., who lost the championship in Japan without it being sanctioned by CMLL

Místico is the current champion, in his first reign. He won the title by defeating MJF in a Title vs. Mask match at CMLL 92nd Anniversary Show on September 19, 2025 in Mexico City, Mexico. Overall, there have been 19 reigns shared between 17 wrestlers, which does not include one unofficial reign by Aquarius. Only two men have held the title more than once; both Dr. Wagner Jr. and Atlantis have officially held the title twice. Dr. Wagner Jr. has the longest combined reigns with 1,574 days, and Último Guerrero holds the record for the longest individual reign with 3 years, 213 days. Because Aquarius' eight-day reign in 1996 is not officially recognized by CMLL, Jerry Estrada's 175-day reign is the shortest in the history of the championship. Not only was Último Guerrero's reign the longest of any individual reign, he is also credited with a record 22 confirmed championship defenses.

CMLL has declared the championship vacant on two separate occasions, which meant that there was no champion for a period of time. Sometimes, a championship is vacated due to an injury to the reigning champion, (Note: Súper Luchas (November 19, 2014): "Por sus lesiones, Místico, la nueva era, ha sido desconocido como portador del Campeonato Mundial de Peso Welter." ("Due to injuries, the new era Místico, has vacated the World Welterweight championship.")) or when a champion stopped working for the promotion, but in the case of the CMLL World Light Heavyweight Championship, there was a storyline reason behind it being declared vacant the first time. In late 2013 the light heavyweight champion Rush was working a long-running storyline rivalry with El Terrible. When El Terrible won the CMLL World Heavyweight Championship, CMLL decided to enhance the rivalry by having Rush voluntarily give up the light heavyweight championship in order to receive a CMLL World Heavyweight Championship match against El Terrible. This allowed CMLL to advance the storyline as well as move the championship off Rush without having Rush lose a match, allowing Rey Escorpión to become the next champion. (Note: Súper Luchas (January 29, 2013): "Rey Escorpión, consiguió una de sus máximas victorias, al coronarse como el nuevo Campeón Mundial Semicompleto versión CMLL, tras vencer al “Depredador del Aire” Volador Jr." ("Rey Escorpión, achieved one of his greatest victories when he became the new CMLL World Light Heavyweight Champion after beating the "Predator of the Air" Volador Jr.")) The second vacancy started on May 22, 2017, when CMLL fired the then-champion Máscara.

== Rules ==
The official definition by the Mexican lucha libre commission for the light heavyweight division in Mexico is between 92 kg (203 lb) and 97 kg (214 lb). (Note: Reglamento de Box y Lucha Libre (2001): "Articulo 242: "Super medio 92 kilos / Semi Completo 97 kilos" ("Article 242: Super Middleweight 92 Kilos / Light Heavyweight 97 Kilos")) In the 20th century, CMLL were generally consistent and strict about enforcing the actual weight limits. In the 21st century the official definitions have at times been overlooked for certain champions. One example of this was when Mephisto, officially listed as 90 kg (200 lb), won the CMLL World Welterweight Championship, a weight class with a 78 kg (172 lb) upper limit. Although the heavyweight championship is traditionally considered the most prestigious weight division in professional wrestling, CMLL places more emphasis on the lower weight divisions. (Note: Madigan (2007): "Traditionally the heavyweight division was not considered the biggest draw, nor the most important division in Mexico")

With twelve CMLL-promoted championships labelled as "World" titles, the promotional focus shifts from championship to championship over time with no single championship consistently promoted as the "main" championship; instead CMLL's various major shows feature different weight divisions and are most often headlined by a Lucha de Apuestas ("Bet match") instead of a championship match. From 2013 until June 2016 only two major CMLL shows have featured championship matches: Sin Salida in 2013, and the 2014 Juicio Final show featuring the NWA World Historic Welterweight Championship. The last time a CMLL World Light Heavyweight Championship match was featured on a major CMLL show was on September 18, 2004, when Último Guerrero successfully defended the title at the CMLL 71st Anniversary Show. Up until late 2021, all championship matches promoted in Mexico took place under best two-out-of-three falls rules. On occasion single fall title matches took place, especially when promoting CMLL title matches in Japan, conforming to the traditions of the local promotion. (Note: An example of this was Bushi winning the CMLL World Welterweight Championship in a one-fall match on a New Japan Pro-Wrestling show.) Outside CMLL, the light heavyweight championship has been defended on joint CMLL/Universal Wrestling Association (UWA) shows in 1993, on W*ING, Big Japan Wrestling, Dragondoor and New Japan Pro-Wrestling shows in Japan.

== Tournaments ==
=== 1991 ===
CMLL held a 16-man tournament from September 15 to October 26, 1991, to crown the first light heavyweight champion. Documentation on Pierroth Jr.'s path to the finals has not been found.

Tournament brackets

First round
Jerry Estrada	W
MS-1
Masakre
Mascara Año 2000	W
El Satánico	W
El Hijo del Solitario
Black Magic	W
Universo 2000
Pierroth Jr.	W
Unknown
Unknown
Unknown
Unknown
Unknown
Unknown
Unknown

Semifinals
Jerry Estrada	W
Mascara Año 2000
Satanico
Black Magic	W
Pierroth Jr.	W
Unknown
Unknown
Unknown

Final
Jerry Estrada	W
Black Magic
Pierroth Jr.	W
Unknown

Finals
Jerry Estrada	W
Pierroth Jr.

=== 2013 ===
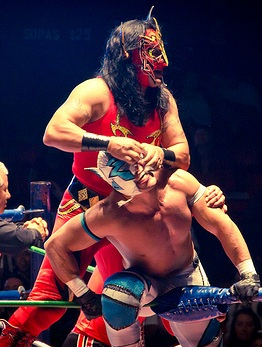
Psicosis (behind, in red) and Delta (in front, in white) both competed in the 2013 torneo cibernetico qualifying match.

CMLL held a tournament to determine the next CMLL World Light Heavyweight Champion starting on January 22, 2013, and the finals were held the following week. The first round of the tournament was a 16-man torneo cibernetico elimination match, with the last two men in the match qualifying for the finals the following week on January 29. The torneo featured two teams of eight wrestling against each other; Team A consisted of Delta, El Felino, La Máscara, Mephisto, Mr. Águila, Rey Escorpión, Stuka Jr. and Volador Jr. and Team B consisted of Atlantis, Blue Panther, Diamante, Euforia, Maximo, Morphosis, Psicosis and Sagrado. The match came down to Team A's Rey Escorpión and Volado Jr. versus Team B's Euforia. Escorpión pulled off Volador Jr.'s mask and threw it to rival Euforia, causing Euforia to be disqualified, which meant that Escorpión and Volador Jr. qualified for the finals the following week. (Note: Súper Luchas (January 29, 2013): "Euforia es descalificado, Rey Escorpión y Volador tuvieron problemas entre ellos y el venenoso le arrancó la máscara." ("Euphoria is disqualified, Rey Escorpión and Volador had problems between them and the Poisonous One ripped off the mask. In the midst of the confusion, the referee ended up disqualifying Euphoria by mistake")) On January 29, Rey Escorpión defeated Volador Jr. in the finals to become the 13th overall CMLL World Light Heavyweight champion.

Cibernetico order of elimination

#	Eliminated	Eliminated by
1	Sagrado	Delta
2	El Felino	Morphosis
3	Atlantis	Rey Escorpión
4	Delta	Euforia
5	Mephisto	Blue Panther
6	Morphosis	Mr. Águila
7	Diamante	Stuka Jr.
8	Blue Panther	Volador Jr.
9	Mr. Águila	Máximo
10	Stuka, Jr.	Máximo (double pin)
10	Máximo	Stuka (double pin)
12	Psicosis	La Máscara
13	La Máscara	Volador Jr.
14	Euforia	Disqualification
15	Finalist	Volador Jr.
15	Finalist	Rey Escorpión
