= Brian Maxine =

British professional wrestler (1938–2024)

Personal information
- Born: 13 August 1938 Ellesmere Port, Cheshire, England
- Died: 13 November 2024 (aged 86)

Professional wrestling career
- Ring name: Brian "Goldbelt" Maxine
- Billed weight: 78 kg (172 lb)
- Billed from: Ellesmere Port, Cheshire, England
- Debut: 1962
- Retired: 1988

Brian Maxine (13 August 1938 – 13 November 2024), known as Goldbelt, was an English professional wrestler and cabaret artist. He held the British Welterweight Championship from 1969 to 1971. He won the British middleweight championship in 1971 and by briefly holding the two belts simultaneously he became the first champion at two weights since the post-war reorganisation of British titles.

Maxine, who was known for his regular and flamboyant appearances in the 1970s on World of Sport, officially held the title (which was inactive) until a new version was established by The Wrestling Alliance (TWA) in 2000, won by James Mason. After this, Maxine claimed only the gold belt as a trophy, not disputing the new championship. A match for Premier Promotions against Johnny Kidd in 2002 was promoted as for only the belt, not the title.

Maxine also recorded country and western albums, backed by Fairport Convention.

In preparation for her role in the musical Teaneck Tanzi: The Venus Flytrap, Maxine trained Debbie Harry from Blondie how to wrestle. In her memoirs, she wrote: "We had a wrestling coach named Brian Maxine who had a massive, muscular, no neck upper body and a perfectly busted up nose. Brian had been a British Champion for years and he was very serious about his job as a coach. For weeks he taught us how to do the holds, make the jumps, take the falls, and do all the different wrestling moves that we did in the show."

Maxine died on 13 November 2024, at the age of 86.

== Championships and accomplishments ==
- Joint Promotions
  - British Middleweight Championship (1 time)
  - British Welterweight Championship (1 time)
