= Mixed martial arts weight classes =

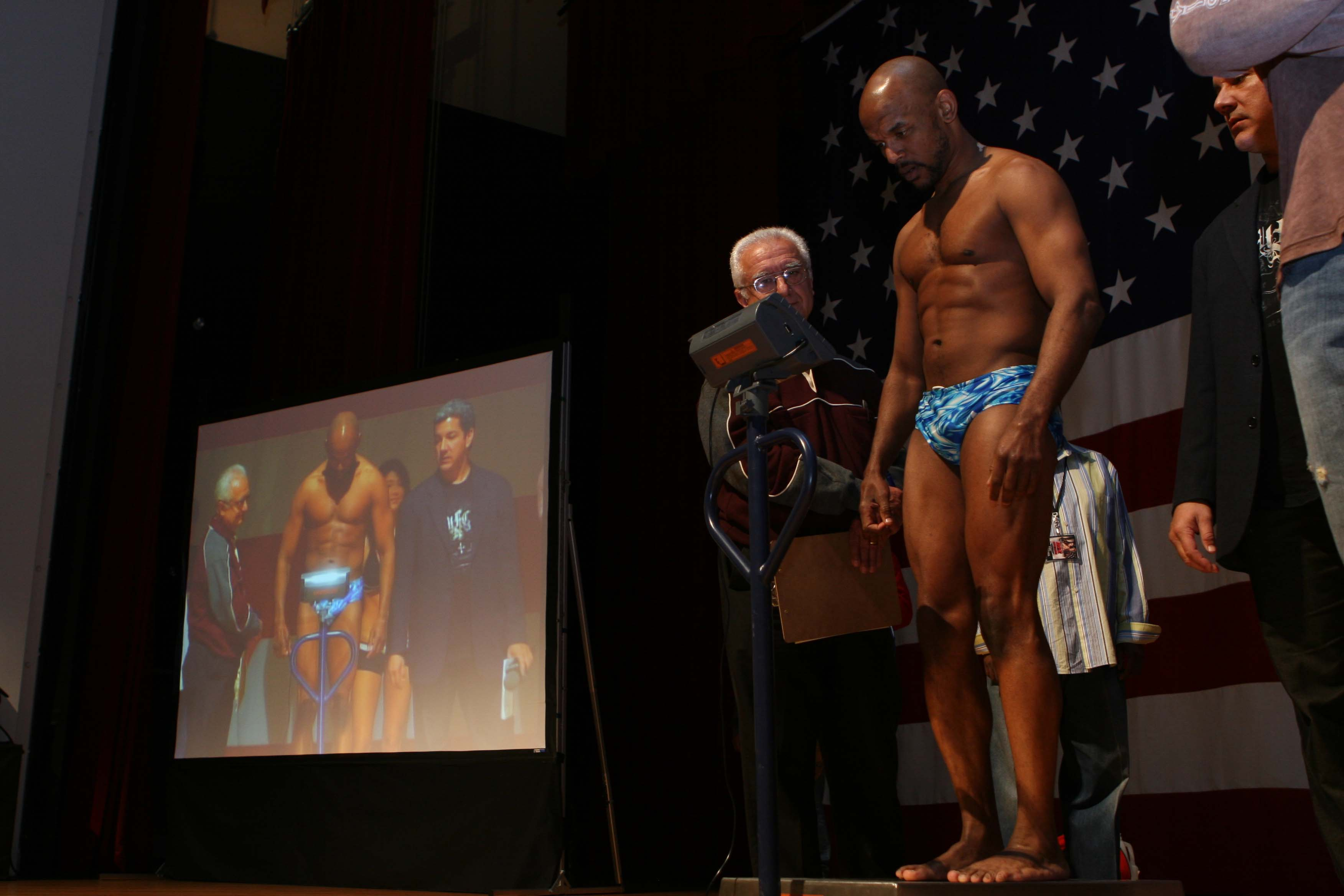
Shonie Carter weighing in for his fight at UFC Fight Night 7

Mixed martial arts weight classes are weight classes that pertain to the sport of mixed martial arts.

== Unified Rules of Mixed Martial Arts ==
Prior to state sanctioning, weight classes were not mandatory since the competitions were held without the approval of the athletic commissions. For instance, the Ultimate Fighting Championship introduced two weight classes at UFC 12: heavyweight, which grouped competitors above 200 lb (91 kg), and lightweight, which grouped competitors under 200 lb.

Weight classes underwent many changes in the ensuing years, but the ability of promotions to autonomously decide their own weight classes eventually disappeared after athletic commissions began supervising mixed martial arts.

In 2000, the Unified Rules of Mixed Martial Arts were codified by the New Jersey State Athletic Commission. The California State Athletic Commission had worked extensively on regulation, but their sanctioning of MMA was not implemented due to state governmental issues surrounding the process. California officially sanctioned MMA on December 28, 2005, using the ruleset it helped devise five years previously.

Since then, to create uniformity, all state commissions in the United States that regulate mixed martial arts have assimilated these rules into their existing unarmed combat competition rules and statutes. For a promotion to hold mixed martial arts events in a state-sanctioned venue, the promotion must abide by the state athletic commission's body of rules for weight limits.

The Unified Rules designate limits for fourteen different weight classes in mixed martial arts; all definitions and measurements are in pounds. The strawweight class was added in 2015. The super lightweight, super welterweight, super middleweight, and cruiserweight classes were added in July 2017.

Weight class	Upper weight limit
Strawweight	115 lb (52.2 kg)
Flyweight	125 lb (56.7 kg)
Bantamweight	135 lb (61.2 kg)
Featherweight	145 lb (65.8 kg)
Lightweight	155 lb (70.3 kg)
Super lightweight	165 lb (74.8 kg)
Welterweight	170 lb (77.1 kg)
Super welterweight	175 lb (79.4 kg)
Middleweight	185 lb (83.9 kg)
Super middleweight	195 lb (88.5 kg)
Light heavyweight	205 lb (93.0 kg)
Cruiserweight	225 lb (102.1 kg)
Heavyweight	265 lb (120.2 kg)
Super heavyweight	No limit

== Outside the United States ==
With no state or government laws regarding weight class restrictions, organizations in other countries are free to schedule bouts with little regard for weight differential. However, due to the increasingly competitive and international nature of the sport, weight limits have been set by the promotions themselves, usually in alignment with the Unified Rules, as maintaining standard weight classes is seen as fair and standard for all competitors. Singapore-based ONE Championship banned weight-cutting by dehydration in December 2015 and holds fights based on a competitor's "walking weight", rather than pre-fight weigh-ins. The change took place after 21-year-old Yang Jian Bing died due to dehydration by weight-cutting in 2015. The new system has been well-received by athletes and other stakeholders in the MMA industry.

== Women ==
Weight limits in women's MMA mostly follow the Unified Rules' limits, but organizations that recognize women's championships usually only have titles at the lower end of the table. UFC, for example, recognizes women's titles in the strawweight, flyweight, and bantamweight classes. Some organizations that recognize women's championships also sanction a separate atomweight title with a 105 pounds (48 kg) limit.

== See also ==
- Brazilian Jiu-Jitsu weight classes
- Weight class (boxing)
- Kickboxing weight classes
- Taekwondo weight classes
- Wrestling weight classes
