= Brazilian jiu-jitsu weight classes =

Weight classes used in Brazilian Jiu-Jitsu

Brazilian jiu-jitsu weight classes are weight classes that pertain to the sport of Brazilian jiu-jitsu (BJJ) and vary according to the organisations.

== IBJJF weight classes ==
The International Brazilian Jiu-Jitsu Federation (IBJJF) is the most prestigious BJJ organisation in the world, it oversees the biggest events in the sport such as the World Jiu-Jitsu Championship, the European Championship, the Asian Open Championship, the Pan-American Championship and the Brazilian Nationals. Rooster is the equivalent to Bantamweight in other combat sports.

IBJJF Gi weight classes (maximum weight)
Weight divisions (Note: The weight divisions are the same for both adults and master classes, Juveniles (male and female) are sometimes additionally divided into age categories with slightly different weight divisions.)	Adults/Masters Gi – male	Juvenile Gi – male	Adults/Masters Gi – female	Juvenile Gi – female
Rooster	57.5 kg (126.8 lb)	53.50 kg (117.9 lb)	48.5 kg (106.9 lb)	44.30 kg (97.7 lb)
Light or Super Feather	64 kg (141.1 lb)	58.50 kg (129.0 lb)	53.5 kg (117.9 lb)	48.30 kg (106.5 lb)
Feather	70 kg (154.3 lb)	64 kg (141.1 lb)	58.5 kg (129.0 lb)	52.50 kg (115.7 lb)
Light	76 kg (167.6 lb)	69 kg (152.1 lb)	64 kg (141.1 lb)	56.50 kg (124.6 lb)
Middle	82.3 kg (181.4 lb)	74 kg (163.1 lb)	69 kg (152.1 lb)	60.50 kg (133.4 lb)
Medium Heavy	88.3 kg (194.7 lb)	79.30 kg (174.8 lb)	74 kg (163.1 lb)	65 kg (143.3 lb)
Heavy	94.3 kg (207.9 lb)	84.30 kg (185.8 lb)	79.3 kg (174.8 lb)	69 kg (152.1 lb)
Super Heavy	100.5 kg (221.6 lb)	89.30 kg (196.9 lb)	No weight limit	No weight limit
Ultra Heavy	No weight limit	No weight limit	n/a	n/a
Open Class	open to all weight divisions	depends on tournament rules	open to all weight divisions	depends on tournament rules

IBJJF No-Gi weight classes
Weight divisions (Maximum weight)	Adults/Masters No Gi – male	Juvenile No Gi – male	Adults/Masters No Gi – female	Juvenile No Gi – female
Rooster	55.5 kg (122.4 lb)	51.50 kg (113.5 lb)	46.5 kg (102.5 lb)	42.50 kg (93.7 lb)
Light or Super Feather	61.5 kg (135.6 lb)	56.50 kg (124.6 lb)	51.5 kg (113.5 lb)	46.50 kg (102.5 lb)
Feather	67.5 kg (148.8 lb)	61.50 kg (135.6 lb)	56.5 kg (124.6 lb)	50.50 kg (111.3 lb)
Light	73.5 kg (162.0 lb)	66.50 kg (146.6 lb)	61.5 kg (135.6 lb)	54.50 kg (120.2 lb)
Middle	79.5 kg (175.3 lb)	71.50 kg (157.6 lb)	66.5 kg (146.6 lb)	58.50 kg (129.0 lb)
Medium Heavy	85.5 kg (188.5 lb)	76.50 kg (168.7 lb)	71.5 kg (157.6 lb)	62.50 kg (137.8 lb)
Heavy	91.5 kg (201.7 lb)	81.50 kg (179.7 lb)	76.5 kg (168.7 lb)	66.50 kg (146.6 lb)
Super Heavy	97.5 kg (215.0 lb)	86.50 kg (190.7 lb)	No weight limit	No weight limit
Ultra Heavy	No weight limit	No weight limit	n/a	n/a
Open Class	open to all weight divisions	depends on tournament rules	open to all weight divisions	depends on tournament rules

== ADCC weight classes ==
Abu Dhabi Combat Club (ADCC) is the largest no gi submission grappling organisation in the world.

ADCC World Championship and ADCC Trials weight classes
Weight class name	Adults/Masters Male (18+)	Adults/Masters Female (18+)
Lightweight	66 kg (145.5 lb)	Below 60 kg (132.3 lb)
Welterweight	77 kg (169.8 lb)	
Middleweight	88 kg (194.0 lb)	
Light Heavyweight	99 kg (218.3 lb)	
Heavyweight	Above 99 kg (218.3 lb)	Above 60 kg (132.3 lb)
Absolute	No weight restriction	

ADCC Teams competition
Weight class name	Adult Male (18+)	Adult Female (18+)
Lightweight	Below 83 kg (183.0 lb)	Below 60 kg (132.3 lb)
Heavyweight	Above 83 kg (183.0 lb)	Above 60 kg (132.3 lb)

National, Open & All Other ADCC Championships
Weight divisions
Adults/Masters – male	Juvenile male (15-18)	Adults/Masters – female	Juvenile female (15-18)
60 kg (132.3 lb)	50 kg (110.2 lb)	50 kg (110.2 lb)	40 kg (88.2 lb)
65 kg (143.3 lb)	55 kg (121.3 lb)	55 kg (121.3 lb)	45 kg (99.2 lb)
70 kg (154.3 lb)	60 kg (132.3 lb)	60 kg (132.3 lb)	50 kg (110.2 lb)
76 kg (167.6 lb)	65 kg (143.3 lb)	65 kg (143.3 lb)	55 kg (121.3 lb)
83 kg (183.0 lb)	70 kg (154.3 lb)	70 kg (154.3 lb)	60 kg (132.3 lb)
91 kg (200.6 lb)	75 kg (165.3 lb)	Above 70 kg (154.3 lb)	Above 60 kg (132.3 lb)
100 kg (220.5 lb)	80 kg (176.4 lb)		
Above 100 kg (220.5 lb)	Above 80 kg (176.4 lb)		

== UAEJJF weight classes ==
The largest events organised by the UAEJJF (United Arab Emirates Jiu-Jitsu Federation) are the Abu Dhabi World Professional Jiu-Jitsu Championship and the Abu Dhabi Grand Slam Jiu-Jitsu World Tour.

UAEJJF weight classes
Weight class name	Adults/Masters Male (18+)	Juvenile Male (16-17)	Adults/Masters Female (18+)	Juvenile Female (16-17)
Roosterweight	—	46 kg (101.4 lb)	49 kg (108.0 lb)	40 kg (88.2 lb)
Light Featherweight	56 kg (123.5 lb)	50 kg (110.2 lb)	55 kg (121.3 lb)	44 kg (97.0 lb)
Featherweight	62 kg (136.7 lb)	55 kg (121.3 lb)		48 kg (105.8 lb)
Lightweight	69 kg (152.1 lb)	60 kg (132.3 lb)	62 kg (136.7 lb)	52 kg (114.6 lb)
Welterweight	77 kg (169.8 lb)	66 kg (145.5 lb)		57 kg (125.7 lb)
Middleweight	85 kg (187.4 lb)	73 kg (160.9 lb)	70 kg (154.3 lb)	63 kg (138.9 lb)
Light Heavyweight	94 kg (207.2 lb)	81 kg (178.6 lb)		70 kg (154.3 lb)
Heavyweight	120 kg (264.6 lb)	94 kg (207.2 lb)	95 kg (209.4 lb)	82 kg (180.8 lb)

== See also ==
- IBJJF
- Abu Dhabi Combat Club Submission Wrestling World Championship
- Boxing Weight Class
- Kickboxing weight classes
- Mixed martial arts weight classes
- Professional wrestling weight classes
- Wrestling weight classes

== Sources ==
- Legacy, Jiu Jitsu (2020-01-03). "Complete Guide to IBJJF Weight Classes (Gi and No-Gi!)". Jiu Jitsu Legacy.
- "BJJ Weight Classes Explained – IBJJF, ADCC, UAEJJF". BJJ Spot. 2020-01-08.
- "UAEJJF Official Statement Regarding End of Absolute Division". BJJ Heroes. 2016-07-01.
- "Official ADCC Weight Classes". Home Page • ADCC NEWS. 2018-04-14.
