= Kickboxing weight classes =

Kickboxing weight classes are weight classes that pertain to the sport of kickboxing.

Organizations will often adopt their own rules for weight limits, causing ambiguity in the sport regarding how a weight class should be defined. For a variety of reasons (largely historical), weight classes of the same name can be of vastly different weights. For example, a boxing middleweight weighs up to 72 kg (160 lb), an ISKA middleweight upper limit is 75 kg (165 lb), and a K-1 middleweight upper limit is 70 kg (154 lb).

== Comparison of organizations ==
This table gives names and limits recognised by the widely regarded sanctioning bodies and promotions in professional kickboxing, Muay Thai and shoot boxing.

Weight class	AJKF	Enfusion	Glory	IKF	ISKA	K-1	MAJKF	NJKF	RISE	Super Kombat	Super League	WAKO	WBC	WFCA	WKA	WKN	WMC	WPMF	WSBA
Super Heavyweight	—	—	—	Unlimited	Unlimited	Unlimited	—	—	—	Unlimited	—	Unlimited	Unlimited	Unlimited	Unlimited	Unlimited	Unlimited	Unlimited	90 kg (198.4 lb)
Heavyweight	Unlimited	Unlimited	Unlimited	106.8 kg (235.5 lb)	96.4 kg (212.5 lb)	—	86.2 kg (190.0 lb)	86.2 kg (190.0 lb)	Unlimited	95 kg (209.4 lb)	95 kg (209.4 lb)	94.1 kg (207.5 lb)	104.545 kg (230.5 lb)	95 kg (209.4 lb)	95 kg (209.4 lb)	96.6 kg (213.0 lb)	95 kg (209.4 lb)	95.454 kg (210.4 lb)	85 kg (187.4 lb)
Super Cruiserweight	—	—	—	97.7 kg (215.4 lb)	91.8 kg (202.4 lb)	100 kg (220.5 lb)	—	—	—	—	—	—	95.455 kg (210.4 lb)	—	90 kg (198.4 lb)	92.5 kg (203.9 lb)	—	—	—
Cruiserweight	—	—	—	88.6 kg (195.3 lb)	88.2 kg (194.4 lb)	—	—	—	—	91 kg (200.6 lb)	—	88.6 kg (195.3 lb)	86.183 kg (190.0 lb)	86.18 kg (190.0 lb)	86 kg (189.6 lb)	88.5 kg (195.1 lb)	86.18 kg (190.0 lb)	86.183 kg (190.0 lb)	—
Light Cruiserweight	—	—	—	84.5 kg (186.3 lb)	84.6 kg (186.5 lb)	—	—	—	—	—	—	85.1 kg (187.6 lb)	—	—	—	—	—	—	—
Super Light Heavyweight	—	—	—	—	—	—	—	—	—	—	—	—	—	82.55 kg (182.0 lb)	83 kg (183.0 lb)	85.5 kg (188.5 lb)	82.55 kg (182.0 lb)	—	—
Light Heavyweight	—	93 kg (205.0 lb)	95 kg (209.4 lb)	81.4 kg (179.5 lb)	81.4 kg (179.5 lb)	—	—	—	—	—	—	81.4 kg (179.5 lb)	79.379 kg (175.0 lb)	79.38 kg (175.0 lb)	79 kg (174.2 lb)	82.1 kg (181.0 lb)	79.38 kg (175.0 lb)	79.379 kg (175.0 lb)	80 kg (176.4 lb)
Super Middleweight	—	—	—	78.2 kg (172.4 lb)	78.1 kg (172.2 lb)	70 kg (154.3 lb)	—	—	—	—	76 kg (167.6 lb)	78.1 kg (172.2 lb)	76.204 kg (168.0 lb)	76.20 kg (168.0 lb)	76 kg (167.6 lb)	79.4 kg (175.0 lb)	76.20 kg (168.0 lb)	76.204 kg (168.0 lb)	75 kg (165.3 lb)
Middleweight	72.575 kg (160.0 lb)	84 kg (185.2 lb)	85 kg (187.4 lb)	75 kg (165.3 lb)	75 kg (165.3 lb)	—	72.57 kg (160.0 lb)	72.57 kg (160.0 lb)	70 kg (154.3 lb)	72 kg (158.7 lb)	73 kg (160.9 lb)	75 kg (165.3 lb)	72.575 kg (160.0 lb)	72.57 kg (160.0 lb)	72.5 kg (159.8 lb)	76.2 kg (168.0 lb)	72.58 kg (160.0 lb)	72.575 kg (160.0 lb)	72 kg (158.7 lb)
Light Middleweight	—	—	—	72.3 kg (159.4 lb)	72.3 kg (159.4 lb)	—	—	—	—	—	—	71.8 kg (158.3 lb)	—	—	—	—	—	—	—
Junior Middleweight	—	—	—	—	—	—	—	—	—	—	—	—	—	69.85 kg (154.0 lb)	—	—	69.85 kg (154.0 lb)	—	—
Super Welterweight	69.853 kg (154.0 lb)	—	—	69.5 kg (153.2 lb)	69.5 kg (153.2 lb)	65 kg (143.3 lb)	—	69.8 kg (153.9 lb)	—	—	70 kg (154.3 lb)	69.1 kg (152.3 lb)	69.853 kg (154.0 lb)	—	70 kg (154.3 lb)	72.6 kg (160.1 lb)	—	69.853 kg (154.0 lb)	70 kg (154.3 lb)
Welterweight	66.678 kg (147.0 lb)	77 kg (169.8 lb)	77 kg (169.8 lb)	66.8 kg (147.3 lb)	66.8 kg (147.3 lb)	—	66.68 kg (147.0 lb)	66.68 kg (147.0 lb)	—	—	67 kg (147.7 lb)	66.8 kg (147.3 lb)	66.678 kg (147.0 lb)	66.68 kg (147.0 lb)	67 kg (147.7 lb)	69.9 kg (154.1 lb)	66.68 kg (147.0 lb)	66.678 kg (147.0 lb)	67 kg (147.7 lb)
Light Welterweight	—	—	—	64.5 kg (142.2 lb)	64.5 kg (142.2 lb)	—	—	—	—	—	—	64.5 kg (142.2 lb)	—	—	—	—	—	—	—
Junior Welterweight	—	—	—	—	—	—	—	—	—	—	—	—	—	63.5 kg (140.0 lb)	—	—	63.5 kg (140.0 lb)	—	—
Super Lightweight	—	—	—	62.3 kg (137.3 lb)	62.3 kg (137.3 lb)	62.5 kg (137.8 lb)	—	—	65 kg (143.3 lb)	—	63 kg (138.9 lb)	62.3 kg (137.3 lb)	63.503 kg (140.0 lb)	—	63.5 kg (140.0 lb)	66.7 kg (147.0 lb)	—	63.503 kg (140.0 lb)	65 kg (143.3 lb)
Lightweight	61.235 kg (135.0 lb)	70 kg (154.3 lb)	70 kg (154.3 lb)	60 kg (132.3 lb)	60 kg (132.3 lb)	—	61.23 kg (135.0 lb)	61.23 kg (135.0 lb)	63 kg (138.9 lb)	—	—	60 kg (132.3 lb)	61.235 kg (135.0 lb)	61.23 kg (135.0 lb)	60 kg (132.3 lb)	64.4 kg (142.0 lb)	61.24 kg (135.0 lb)	61.235 kg (135.0 lb)	62 kg (136.7 lb)
Junior Lightweight	—	—	—	—	—	—	—	—	—	—	—	—	—	58.97 kg (130.0 lb)	—	—	58.97 kg (130.0 lb)	—	—
Super Featherweight	58.967 kg (130.0 lb)	—	—	—	—	60 kg (132.3 lb)	58.97 kg (130.0 lb)	58.97 kg (130.0 lb)	60 kg (132.3 lb)	—	—	—	58.967 kg (130.0 lb)	—	—	62.1 kg (136.9 lb)	—	58.967 kg (130.0 lb)	60 kg (132.3 lb)
Featherweight	57.153 kg (126.0 lb)	66 kg (145.5 lb)	65 kg (143.3 lb)	57.7 kg (127.2 lb)	58.2 kg (128.3 lb)	—	57.15 kg (126.0 lb)	57.15 kg (126.0 lb)	57.5 kg (126.8 lb)	—	—	58.2 kg (128.3 lb)	57.153 kg (126.0 lb)	57.15 kg (126.0 lb)	57 kg (125.7 lb)	60.3 kg (132.9 lb)	57.15 kg (126.0 lb)	57.153 kg (126.0 lb)	57 kg (125.7 lb)
Junior Featherweight	—	—	—	—	—	—	—	—	—	—	—	—	—	55.34 kg (122.0 lb)	—	—	55.34 kg (122.0 lb)	—	—
Super Bantamweight	—	—	—	—	56.4 kg (124.3 lb)	55 kg (121.3 lb)	—	—	—	—	—	—	55.338 kg (122.0 lb)	—	—	58.5 kg (129.0 lb)	—	55.338 kg (122.0 lb)	55 kg (121.3 lb)
Bantamweight	53.524 kg (118.0 lb)	61 kg (134.5 lb)	—	55.4 kg (122.1 lb)	54.5 kg (120.2 lb)	—	53.52 kg (118.0 lb)	53.52 kg (118.0 lb)	55 kg (121.3 lb)	—	—	56.4 kg (124.3 lb)	53.524 kg (118.0 lb)	53.52 kg (118.0 lb)	54 kg (119.0 lb)	56.7 kg (125.0 lb)	53.52 kg (118.0 lb)	53.524 kg (118.0 lb)	52 kg (114.6 lb)
Junior Bantamweight	—	—	—	—	—	—	—	—	—	—	—	—	—	52.16 kg (115.0 lb)	—	—	52.16 kg (115.0 lb)	—	—
Super Flyweight	—	—	—	—	53.2 kg (117.3 lb)	—	—	—	—	—	—	—	52.163 kg (115.0 lb)	—	—	54.9 kg (121.0 lb)	—	52.163 kg (115.0 lb)	—
Flyweight	—	57 kg (125.7 lb)	—	53.2 kg (117.3 lb)	51.8 kg (114.2 lb)	—	50.8 kg (112.0 lb)	50.8 kg (112.0 lb)	—	—	—	54.5 kg (120.2 lb)	50.802 kg (112.0 lb)	—	50 kg (110.2 lb)	53.5 kg (117.9 lb)	50.8 kg (112.0 lb)	50.802 kg (112.0 lb)	50 kg (110.2 lb)
Light Flyweight	—	—	—	—	—	—	—	—	—	—	—	—	48.988 kg (108.0 lb)	—	—	—	—	—	—
Junior Flyweight	—	—	—	—	—	—	—	—	—	—	—	—	—	—	—	—	48.99 kg (108.0 lb)	—	—
Mini Flyweight	—	—	—	—	—	—	—	—	—	—	—	—	47.727 kg (105.2 lb)	—	—	—	47.62 kg (105.0 lb)	—	—
Super Atomweight	—	—	—	—	50.5 kg (111.3 lb)	—	—	—	—	—	—	—	—	—	50.5 kg (111.3 lb)	—	—	—	—
Atomweight	—	—	—	50.9 kg (112.2 lb)	—	—	—	—	—	—	—	52.7 kg (116.2 lb)	—	—	50.5 kg (111.3 lb)	—	—	—	—
Strawweight	—	52 kg (114.6 lb)	—	49.1 kg (108.2 lb)	—	—	—	—	—	—	—	—	—	—	—	—	—	—	—
Minimumweight	—	—	—	—	—	—	—	—	—	—	—	—	—	—	—	—	—	—	47 kg (103.6 lb)

== AJKF ==
The (now defunct) All Japan Kickboxing Federation (AJKF) utilized the following weight classes:

Weight class name	Upper limit
Flyweight	51 kg (112.4 lb)
Light Bantamweight	53.5 kg (117.9 lb)
Bantamweight	56 kg (123.5 lb)
Featherweight	58.5 kg (129.0 lb)
Lightweight	61 kg (134.5 lb)
Light Welterweight	63.5 kg (140.0 lb)
Welterweight	66 kg (145.5 lb)
Light Middleweight	69 kg (152.1 lb)
Middleweight	73 kg (160.9 lb)
Heavyweight	No weight limit

== Enfusion ==
Enfusion utilizes the following weight classes:

Weight class name	Upper limit
Strawweight	53 kg (116.8 lb)
Flyweight	57 kg (125.7 lb)
Bantamweight	61 kg (134.5 lb)
Featherweight	65 kg (143.3 lb)
Lightweight	70 kg (154.3 lb)
Welterweight	77 kg (169.8 lb)
Middleweight	84 kg (185.2 lb)
Light Heavyweight	93 kg (205.0 lb)
Heavyweight	No weight limit

== Glory ==
Glory utilizes the following weight classes:

Weight class name	Upper limit
Super Bantamweight (female)	55 kg (121.3 lb)
Featherweight	65 kg (143.3 lb)
Lightweight	70 kg (154.3 lb)
Welterweight	77 kg (169.8 lb)
Middleweight	85 kg (187.4 lb)
Light Heavyweight	95 kg (209.4 lb)
Heavyweight	No weight limit

== IKF ==
The International Kickboxing Federation (IKF) utilizes the following weight classes:

Weight class name	Upper limit	Gender
Atomweight	107 lb (48.534 kg)	Feminine
Strawweight	112 lb (50.802 kg)	Feminine / Masculine
Flyweight	117 lb (53.070 kg)	Feminine / Masculine
Bantamweight	122 lb (55.338 kg)	Feminine / Masculine
Featherweight	127 lb (57.606 kg)	Feminine / Masculine
Lightweight	132 lb (59.874 kg)	Feminine / Masculine
Super Lightweight	137 lb (62.142 kg)	Feminine / Masculine
Light Welterweight	142 lb (64.410 kg)	Feminine / Masculine
Welterweight	147 lb (66.678 kg)	Feminine / Masculine
Super Welterweight	153 lb (69.400 kg)	Feminine / Masculine
Light Middleweight	159 lb (72.121 kg)	Feminine / Masculine
Middleweight	165 lb (74.843 kg)	Feminine / Masculine
Super Middleweight	171 lb (77.564 kg)	Feminine / Masculine
Light Heavyweight	178 lb (80.739 kg)	Masculine
Light Cruiserweight	185 lb (83.915 kg)	Masculine
Cruiserweight	195 lb (88.451 kg)	Masculine
Super Cruiserweight	215 lb (97.522 kg)	Masculine
Heavyweight	235 lb (106.594 kg)	Masculine
Super Heavyweight	No weight limit	Masculine

== ISKA ==
The International Sport Kickboxing Association (ISKA) utilizes the following weight classes:

Weight class name	Upper limit	Gender
Atomweight	105 lb (47.627 kg)	Feminine
Light Flyweight	109 lb (49.442 kg)	Feminine
Flyweight	113 lb (51.256 kg)	Feminine
Light Bantamweight	117 lb (53.070 kg)	Feminine / Masculine
Bantamweight	121 lb (54.885 kg)	Feminine / Masculine
Featherweight	125 lb (56.699 kg)	Feminine / Masculine
Super Featherweight	130 lb (58.967 kg)	Feminine / Masculine
Lightweight	135 lb (61.235 kg)	Feminine / Masculine
Super Lightweight	140 lb (63.503 kg)	Feminine / Masculine
Light Welterweight	145 lb (65.771 kg)	Feminine / Masculine
Welterweight	150 lb (68.039 kg)	Feminine / Masculine
Super Welterweight	155 lb (70.307 kg)	Feminine / Masculine
Light Middleweight	160 lb (72.575 kg)	Feminine / Masculine
Middleweight	165 lb (74.843 kg)	Feminine / Masculine
Super Middleweight	172 lb (78.018 kg)	Feminine / Masculine
Light Heavyweight	179 lb (81.193 kg)	Masculine
Light Cruiserweight	187 lb (84.822 kg)	Masculine
Cruiserweight	195 lb (88.451 kg)	Masculine
Super Cruiserweight	210 lb (95.254 kg)	Masculine
Heavyweight	230 lb (104.326 kg)	Masculine
Super Heavyweight	No weight limit	Masculine

== It's Showtime ==
It's Showtime (now defunct) utilized the following weight classes:

Weight class name	Upper limit	
Weight class name	in kilograms (kg)	in pounds (lb)
61MAX	61	134.5
65MAX	65	143.3
69MAX	69	152.1
73MAX	73	160.9
77MAX	77	169.8
85MAX	85	187.4
95MAX	95	209.4
Heavyweight	No weight limit	

== K-1 ==
K-1 utilizes the following weight classes:

Weight class name	Upper limit
Bantamweight	55 kg (121.3 lb)
Featherweight	60 kg (132.3 lb)
Lightweight	65 kg (143.3 lb)
Welterweight	70 kg (154.3 lb)
Middleweight	75 kg (165.3 lb)
Heavyweight	100 kg (220.5 lb)
Super Heavyweight	No weight limit

== K-1 JAPAN ==
K-1 Japan Group utilizes the following weight classes:

Weight class name	Upper limit
Flyweight	51.5 kg (113.5 lb)
Bantamweight	53 kg (116.8 lb)
Super Bantamweight	55 kg (121.3 lb)
Featherweight	57.5 kg (126.8 lb)
Super Featherweight	60 kg (132.3 lb)
Lightweight	62.5 kg (137.8 lb)
Super Lightweight	65 kg (143.3 lb)
Welterweight	67.5 kg (148.8 lb)
Super Welterweight	70 kg (154.3 lb)
Middleweight	75 kg (165.3 lb)
Super Middleweight	90 kg (198.4 lb)
Heavyweight	Unlimited

== KOK ==
King of Kings (KOK) utilizes the following weight classes:

Weight class name	Upper limit
Featherweight	65 kg (143.3 lb)
Lightweight	70 kg (154.3 lb)
Welterweight	77 kg (169.8 lb)
Middleweight	85 kg (187.4 lb)
Light Heavyweight	95 kg (209.4 lb)
Heavyweight	No weight limit

== Krush ==
Krush utilizes the following weight classes:

Weight class name	Upper limit	
Weight class name	in kilograms (kg)	in pounds (lb)
54 kg	54	119
57 kg	57	125.7
60 kg	60	132.3
63 kg	63	138.9
67 kg	67	147.7
71 kg	71	156.5

== Kunlun Fight ==
Kunlun Fight utilizes the following weight classes:

Weight Classes	Kilograms(kg)	Pounds(lbs)
Strawweight	51	115
Flyweight	57	125
Bantamweight	61	135
Featherweight	66	145
Lightweight	70	155
Welterweight	77	170
Middleweight	84	185
Light Heavyweight	93	205
Heavyweight	Unlimited	Unlimited

== MAJKF ==
The Martial Arts Japan Kickboxing Federation (MAJKF) utilizes the following weight classes:

Weight class name	Upper limit
Flyweight	50 kg (110.2 lb)
Super Flyweight	52 kg (114.6 lb)
Bantamweight	54 kg (119.0 lb)
Super Bantamweight	56 kg (123.5 lb)
Featherweight	58 kg (127.9 lb)
Super Featherweight	60 kg (132.3 lb)
Lightweight	62 kg (136.7 lb)
Light Welterweight	64 kg (141.1 lb)
Welterweight	67 kg (147.7 lb)
Light Middleweight	70 kg (154.3 lb)
Middleweight	75 kg (165.3 lb)
Heavyweight	85 kg (187.4 lb)

== NJKF ==
The New Japan Kickboxing Federation (NJKF) utilizes the following weight classes:

Weight class name	Upper limit	Gender
Atomweight	46 kg (101.4 lb)	Feminine
Strawweight	49 kg (108.0 lb)	Feminine
Flyweight	52 kg (114.6 lb)	Feminine / Masculine
Bantamweight	55 kg (121.3 lb)	Feminine / Masculine
Featherweight	58 kg (127.9 lb)	Feminine / Masculine
Lightweight	61 kg (134.5 lb)	Feminine / Masculine
Welterweight	64 kg (141.1 lb)	Masculine
Middleweight	67 kg (147.7 lb)	Masculine
Light Heavyweight	70 kg (154.3 lb)	Masculine
Cruiserweight	75 kg (165.3 lb)	Masculine
Heavyweight	No weight limit	Masculine

== PKA ==
The (now defunct) Professional Karate Association (PKA) utilized the following weight classes:

Weight class name	Upper limit
Flyweight	120 lb (54.4 kg)
Bantamweight	130 lb (59.0 kg)
Featherweight	140 lb (63.5 kg)
Lightweight	150 lb (68.0 kg)
Welterweight	160 lb (72.6 kg)
Middleweight	170 lb (77.1 kg)
Light Heavyweight	185 lb (83.9 kg)
Heavyweight	No weight limit

== ONE Championship ==
The ONE Championship utilizes the following weight classes:

Weight class name	Upper limit
Atomweight	115 lb (52.163 kg)
Strawweight	125 lb (56.699 kg)
Flyweight	135 lb (61.235 kg)
Bantamweight	145 lb (65.771 kg)
Featherweight	155 lb (70.307 kg)
Lightweight	170 lb (77.111 kg)
Welterweight	185 lb (83.915 kg)
Middleweight	205 lb (92.986 kg)
Light Heavyweight	225 lb (102.058 kg)
Heavyweight	265 lb (120.202 kg)

== RISE ==
Real Impact Sports Entertainment (RISE) utilizes the following weight classes:

Weight class name	Upper limit
Flyweight	52.5 kg (115.7 lb)
Bantamweight	55 kg (121.3 lb)
Featherweight	57.5 kg (126.8 lb)
Super Featherweight	60 kg (132.3 lb)
Lightweight	62.5 kg (137.8 lb)
Super Lightweight	65 kg (143.3 lb)
Welterweight	67.5 kg (148.8 lb)
Middleweight	70 kg (154.3 lb)
Super Middleweight	80 kg (176.4 lb)
Light Heavyweight	90 kg (198.4 lb)
Heavyweight	Unlimited

== Shoot Boxing ==
The Shoot Boxing utilizes the following weight classes:

Name	Upper weight limit
Flyweight	47.5 kg (104.7 lb)
Super Flyweight	50 kg (110.2 lb)
Bantamweight	52.5 kg (115.7 lb)
Super Bantamweight	55 kg (121.3 lb)
Featherweight	57.5 kg (126.8 lb)
Super Featherweight	60 kg (132.3 lb)
Lightweight	62.5 kg (137.8 lb)
Super Lightweight	65 kg (143.3 lb)
Welterweight	67.5 kg (148.8 lb)
Super Welterweight	70 kg (154.3 lb)
Middleweight	72.5 kg (159.8 lb)
Super Middleweight	75 kg (165.3 lb)
Light Heavyweight	80 kg (176.4 lb)
Heavyweight	90 kg (198.4 lb)
Super Heavyweight	Unlimited

== Superkombat ==
Superkombat Fighting Championship utilizes the following weight classes:

Weight class name	Upper limit
Lightweight	65 kg (143.3 lb)
Welterweight	75 kg (165.3 lb)
Middleweight	85 kg (187.4 lb)
Heavyweight	95 kg (209.4 lb)
Super Heavyweight	No weight limit

== Superleague ==
Superleague utilizes the following weight classes:

Weight class name	Upper limit
Lightweight	61 kg (134.5 lb)
Super Lightweight	64 kg (141.1 lb)
Welterweight	67 kg (147.7 lb)
Super Welterweight	70 kg (154.3 lb)
Middleweight	73 kg (160.9 lb)
Super Middleweight	76 kg (167.6 lb)
Heavyweight	91 kg (200.6 lb)

== Thai Stadiums ==
Weight class name		Upper limit	
Lumpinee	Rajadamnern	In kilograms (kg)	In pounds (lb)
Strawweight	Mini Flyweight	48.5	106
Super Strawweight	Light Flyweight	49.4	109
Flyweight	Flyweight	50.8	112
Super Flyweight	Super Flyweight	52.2	115
Bantamweight	Bantamweight	53.5	118
Super Bantamweight	Super Bantamweight	55.3	122
Featherweight	Featherweight	57.1	126
Super Featherweight	Super Featherweight	58.9	130
Lightweight	Lightweight	61.2	135
Super Lightweight	Light Welterweight	63.5	140
Welterweight	Welterweight	66.6	147
Super Welterweight	Light Middleweight	69.8	154
―	Middleweight	73	161

== WAKO ==
The World Association of Kickboxing Organizations (WAKO) utilizes the following weight classes:

Male

Weight class name	Upper limit
Junior Flyweight	50 kg (110.2 lb)
Flyweight	52.5 kg (115.7 lb)
Junior Bantamweight	55 kg (121.3 lb)
Bantamweight	57.5 kg (126.8 lb)
Junior Featherweight	60 kg (132.3 lb)
Featherweight	63 kg (138.9 lb)
Junior Lightweight	66 kg (145.5 lb)
Lightweight	69 kg (152.1 lb)
Junior Welterweight	72 kg (158.7 lb)
Welterweight	75 kg (165.3 lb)
Junior Middleweight	78 kg (172.0 lb)
Middleweight	82 kg (180.8 lb)
Junior Cruiserweight	86 kg (189.6 lb)
Cruiserweight	91 kg (200.6 lb)
Junior Heavyweight	99 kg (218.3 lb)
Heavyweight	Over 99 kg

Female

Weight class name	Upper limit
Flyweight	49 kg (108.0 lb)
Bantamweight	52 kg (114.6 lb)
Featherweight	55 kg (121.3 lb)
Lightweight	58 kg (127.9 lb)
Welterweight	64 kg (141.1 lb)
Middleweight	70 kg (154.3 lb)
Light Heavyweight	75 kg (165.3 lb)
Heavyweight	Over 75 kg

== WBC Muaythai ==
The World Boxing Council Muaythai (WBC Muaythai) utilizes the following weight classes:

Weight class name	Upper limit	
Weight class name	in kilograms (kg)	in pounds (lb)
Mini Flyweight	47.627	105
Light Flyweight	48.988	108
Flyweight	50.802	112
Super Flyweight	52.163	115
Bantamweight	53.524	118
Super Bantamweight	55.338	122
Featherweight	57.153	126
Super Featherweight	58.967	130
Lightweight	61.235	135
Super Lightweight	63.503	140
Welterweight	66.678	147
Super Welterweight	69.853	154
Middleweight	72.575	160
Super Middleweight	76.204	168
Light Heavyweight	79.379	175
Cruiserweight	86.183	190
Bridgerweight	101.605	224
Heavyweight	Over 101.605	Over 224

== WFCA ==
The World Full Contact Association (WFCA) utilizes the following weight classes:

Weight class name	Upper limit	
Weight class name	in kilograms (kg)	in pounds (lb)
Junior Bantamweight	51.71	114
Bantamweight	53.52	118
Junior Featherweight	55.34	122
Featherweight	57.15	126
Junior Lightweight	58.97	130
Lightweight	61.23	135
Junior Welterweight	63.50	140
Welterweight	66.68	147
Junior Middleweight	69.85	154
Middleweight	73.03	161
Super Middleweight	76.20	168
Junior Cruiserweight	79.38	175
Junior Heavyweight	83.91	185
Cruiserweight	88.45	195
Heavyweight	95.25	210
Super Heavyweight	No weight limit	

== WKA ==
The World Kickboxing Association (WKA) utilizes the following weight classes for both amateur and professional competitions:

Weight class name	Upper limit	Gender
Atomweight	46 kg (101.4 lb)	Feminine
Super Atomweight	48 kg (105.8 lb)	Feminine
Flyweight	50 kg (110.2 lb)	Feminine
Bantamweight	53.5 kg (117.9 lb)	Feminine / Masculine
Featherweight	57 kg (125.7 lb)	Feminine / Masculine
Lightweight	60 kg (132.3 lb)	Feminine / Masculine
Super Lightweight	63.5 kg (140.0 lb)	Feminine / Masculine
Welterweight	67 kg (147.7 lb)	Feminine / Masculine
Super Welterweight	70 kg (154.3 lb)	Feminine / Masculine
Middleweight	73.5 kg (162.0 lb)	Feminine / Masculine
Super Middleweight	77 kg (169.8 lb)	Feminine / Masculine
Light Heavyweight	80 kg (176.4 lb)	Masculine
Cruiserweight	83.5 kg (184.1 lb)	Masculine
Super Cruiserweight	90 kg (198.4 lb)	Masculine
Heavyweight	95 kg (209.4 lb)	Masculine
Heavyweight	Over 77 kg (169.8 lb)	Feminine
Super Heavyweight	Over 95 kg (209.4 lb)	Masculine

== WKN ==
The World Kickboxing Network (WKN) utilizes the following weight classes:

Weight class name	Upper limit
Flyweight	117 lb (53.070 kg)
Super Flyweight	121 lb (54.885 kg)
Bantamweight	125 lb (56.699 kg)
Super Bantamweight	129 lb (58.513 kg)
Featherweight	133 lb (60.328 kg)
Super Featherweight	137 lb (62.142 kg)
Lightweight	142 lb (64.410 kg)
Super Lightweight	147 lb (66.678 kg)
Welterweight	154 lb (69.853 kg)
Super Welterweight	161 lb (73.028 kg)
Middleweight	168 lb (76.204 kg)
Super Middleweight	175 lb (79.379 kg)
Light Heavyweight	182 lb (82.554 kg)
Super Light Heavyweight	189 lb (85.729 kg)
Cruiserweight	196 lb (88.904 kg)
Super Cruiserweight	203 lb (92.079 kg)
Heavyweight	230 lb (104.326 kg)
Super Heavyweight	Unlimited

== WMC ==
The World Muaythai Council (WMC) utilizes the following weight classes:

Weight class name	Upper limit	
Weight class name	in kilograms (kg)	in pounds (lb)
Mini Flyweight	47.62	105
Junior Flyweight	48.99	108
Flyweight	50.35	111
Junior Bantamweight	51.71	114
Bantamweight	53.52	118
Junior Featherweight	55.34	122
Featherweight	57.15	126
Junior Lightweight	58.97	130
Lightweight	61.24	135
Junior Welterweight	63.5	140
Welterweight	66.68	147
Junior Middleweight	69.85	154
Middleweight	73.03	161
Super Middleweight	76.2	168
Light Heavyweight	79.38	175
Junior Heavyweight	82.55	182
Cruiserweight	86.18	190
Heavyweight	95.3	210
Super Heavyweight	No weight limit	

== WPMF ==
The World Professional Muaythai Federation (WPMF) utilizes the following weight classes:

Weight class name	Upper limit		Gender
Weight class name	in kilograms (kg)	in pounds (lb)	Gender
Pinweight	46.720	103	Feminine
Mini Flyweight	48.081	106	Feminine
Light Flyweight	49.442	109	Feminine
Flyweight	50.802	112	Feminine / Masculine
Super Flyweight	52.163	115	Feminine / Masculine
Bantamweight	53.524	118	Feminine / Masculine
Super Bantamweight	55.338	122	Feminine / Masculine
Featherweight	57.153	126	Feminine / Masculine
Super Featherweight	58.967	130	Feminine / Masculine
Lightweight	61.235	135	Feminine / Masculine
Super Lightweight	63.503	140	Feminine / Masculine
Welterweight	66.678	147	Feminine / Masculine
Super Welterweight	69.853	154	Feminine / Masculine
Middleweight	73.028	161	Feminine / Masculine
Super Middleweight	76.204	168	Feminine / Masculine
Cruiserweight	79.379	175	Masculine
Super Cruiserweight	86.183	190	Masculine
Heavyweight	95.254	210	Masculine
Super Heavyweight	120.202	265	Masculine

== See also ==
- Brazilian Jiu-Jitsu weight classes
- Boxing Weight Class
- Mixed martial arts weight classes
- Taekwondo weight classes
- Professional wrestling weight classes
- Wrestling weight classes
