= Admiral-Lord Mountevans rules =

Code of rules for wrestling in the United Kingdom

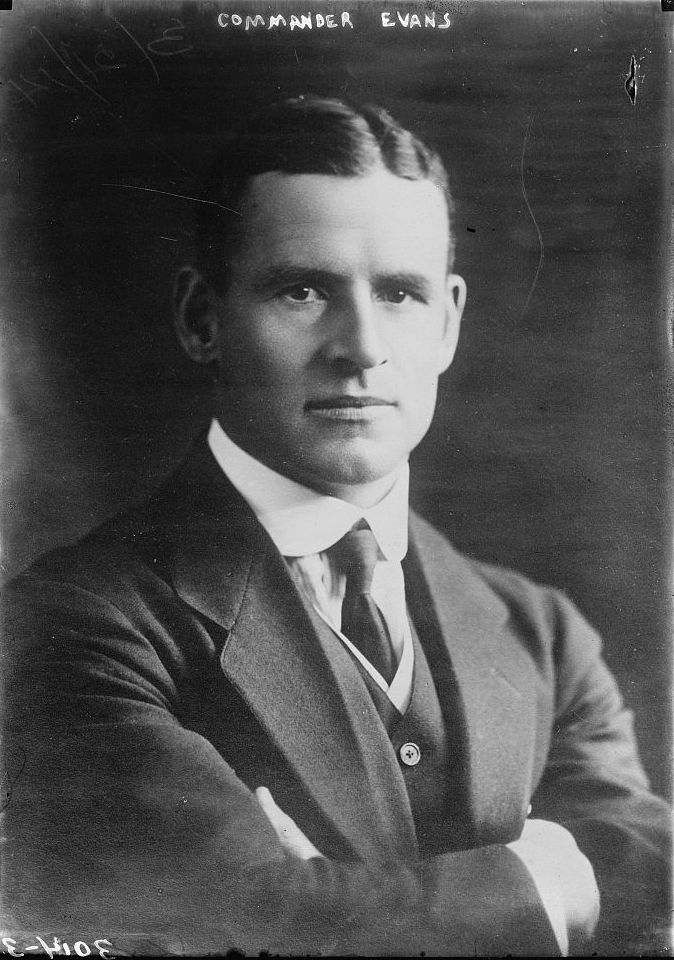
Baron Mountevans headed up a committee which created rules for British professional wrestling. These rules were used to legitimatise wrestling to the public as an actual sport, but their actual purpose was to radically alter the style of presentation used.

Admiral-Lord Mountevans rules were a set of professional wrestling rules mainly used in the United Kingdom in the second half of the 20th century. Introduced in 1947, they were named after Edward Evans, 1st Baron Mountevans, who ordered a unified set of rules written up for professional wrestling in the British Isles to re-legitimise professional wrestling in the eyes of the public and the press. Professional wrestling in the United Kingdom had become discredited before World War II due to the prominence of the preceding "All In" style, which came to emphasise an "anything goes" style of presentation. Professional wrestling promoters in the United Kingdom rallied behind the Mountevans rules and radically altered how professional wrestling was presented in the United Kingdom thereafter. The style of wrestling under the Mountevans rules was advertised by promoters as Modern Freestyle Wrestling.

Mountevans rules would remain the predominant style of professional wrestling in the United Kingdom until the 1990s, when they were increasingly abandoned in favour of a style and presentation in line with American professional wrestling. Some UK promotions continue to use either the full rules and/or hybrid systems for all or selected matches. Modern UK promotions using Mountevans rules are sometimes referred to as World of Sport Style promotions.

== History ==
Professional wrestling in the United Kingdom, under the All In rules, had been popular in the 1930s. However, as a result of a shift in focus away from technical skill and towards violence including usage of weapons, it was banned towards the end of the decade by the London County Council.

After a failed attempt to relaunch the sport with a show at Harringay Arena, Middlesex in 1947 was condemned by journalists as being "fake", Admiral-Lord Mountevans along with radio personality Commander Archibald Bruce Campbell, Maurice Webb MP and Norman Morell, an amateur wrestling champion and professional wrestling promoter, formed a committee to formalise professional wrestling in the United Kingdom and write up a set of unified rules.

Once the rules were written, they were almost universally accepted with 95% of promotions in the United Kingdom adopting them. In 1952, the rules were adopted by the newly formed Joint Promotions, officially as a way to uphold the committee's ideology but was also considered to be a way for Joint Promotions to effectively control British wrestling. In practice, independent promotions at the time adhered to the rule system in all but name and most major promoters in mainland western Europe adopted systems broadly modelled on the Mountevans Rules (although French wrestling had largely abandoned rounds by the time it arrived on French TV in the mid 1950s).

In London, the new rules led to the ban on professional wrestling being lifted however a by-law authorised by the Home Office and the Metropolitan Police kept female wrestling banned within the Greater London area until 1987.

Over the course of the 1990s, matches without rounds became increasingly prevalent. In the 21st century, Premier Promotions implements the full Mountevans Rules, with other old school promotions (such as All Star Wrestling and Rumble Wrestling) occasionally promoting high-profile matches (such as certain title bouts) under the full rules but usually adopting hybrid rules mixing elements of the Mountevans system with American rules more familiar to modern fans. Some "New School" (Americanised) promotions also run "World of Sport Rules" matches as a gimmick match sometimes as parody. In 2001, WWE also parodied the Mountevans Rules with its "Duchess of Queensbury Rules match" at Backlash. In 2020, WWE's NXT UK brand created a new secondary championship called the NXT UK Heritage Cup. The matches for the NXT UK Heritage Cup are held in British Round Rules, which adopted parts of the Mountevans Rules.

== Weight divisions ==
The rules set out seven weight divisions with maximum weight limits and called for champions to be crowned of each limit : Lightweight (154 lb or ~70 kg), Welterweight (165 lb or ~75 kg), Middleweight (176 lb or ~80 kg), Heavy Middleweight (187 lb or ~85 kg), Light Heavyweight (198 lb or ~90 kg), Mid-Heavyweight (209 lb or ~95 kg) and Heavyweight for all weights above 210 lb (95 kg). In the early days, the champions of these weight divisions were also known as Mountevans Champions as the Championships also included Mountevans in their official names.

All seven weight divisions have undergone title changes in the 21st century. All Star Wrestling continues to promote the British Heavyweight Championship brought across from Joint Promotions by Tony St. Clair as its top championship (often referred to as the "Superslam" title.) All Star also revived the British Mid-Heavyweight Championship in 2002, two decades after the death of previous champion Mike Marino and the British Light Heavyweight Championship in the early 2010s. The British Middleweight Championship was last active for RBW in 2004 and the British Welterweight Championship last changed hands for LDN Wrestling in 2008. The British Lightweight Championship was reactivated in October 2021 by Rumble Promotions and won by Nino Bryant, the first ever Mountevans champion to have been born in the 21st century. This leaves only the British Heavy Middleweight Championship which was last active in the 1990s, although the Mountevans World Heavy Middleweight Championship was won by Mikey Whiplash in 2009 for All Star.

== Rules ==
The Admiral-Lord Mountevans rules defined what holds were legal and how a fall could be scored:

The legal techniques were:

- standing and ground Half nelsons, quarter Nelsons, three quarter Nelsons and full Nelson.
- standing or the ground, front, side or reverse head chancery.
- waist holds.
- standing or ground arm up at the back, arm up at the back with elbow press, arm up at the back with bar.
- standing or ground wrist lever, wrist bend, arm lever or double arm lever.
- crotch hold.
- single or double leg holds, back heel, leg stroke, knee stroke, single or double leg hank.
- wrestler's bridge.
- scissors.
- flying mare, ground or standing arm roll or double arm rolls.
- buttock, cross buttock, locked arm buttock, crossed arm buttock, locked arm back drop.

A fall could be awarded by the following means:

- Pinfall – the referee will verbally conduct the three-count rather than slapping the canvas.
- Submission
- Knockout – failing to answer the referee's 10 count when thrown or knocked to the canvas or outside the ring.
- Technical Knockout – If the opponent is ruled unfit to continue by the referee.
- Disqualification – generally applicable upon a wrestler receiving the third of three "Public Warnings" given by the referee for serious or persistent offences.

In singles matches which consisted of six three-minute rounds, with a thirty-second break between each round, could either be 2-Out-of-3 Falls or the wrestler with the most falls wins at the end of the final round, a win was immediately awarded in the event of a knockout or disqualification, regardless of whether or not falls had previously been scored. Later when Tag Team wrestling was introduced to Britain, generally the disqualified or knocked-out wrestler was eliminated and a single fall awarded to the opposing team. The partner of the eliminated wrestler would then continue the match for any remaining falls under handicap tag conditions.

== See also ==
- Professional wrestling in the United Kingdom
