= NWA World Light Heavyweight Championship (Australian version) =

Details
- Promotion: World Championship Wrestling
- Date established: April 1975
- Date retired: August 1975
Statistics
- First champion: Ron Miller
- Final champion: The Great Mephisto
- Most reigns: Bobby Hart (2)

The NWA World Light Heavyweight Championship was a professional wrestling championship owned and promoted by the National Wrestling Alliance's Australia territory, World Championship Wrestling.

== Title history ==
Wrestler:	Times:	Date won:	Location:	Notes:
Bobby Hart	1	75/04	Sydney	Announced as NWA World Light Heavyweight champion having defeated Ken Mantell
Ron Miller	1	75/04/18	Sydney	
Bobby Hart	2	75/07/18	Sydney	
The Great Mephisto	1	75/07/25	Sydney	Stripped on 75/08/01 for using illegal brain buster hold. title retired in 75/08

== See also ==
- Professional wrestling in Australia
