= Weight cutting =

Practice of fast weight loss prior to a sporting competition

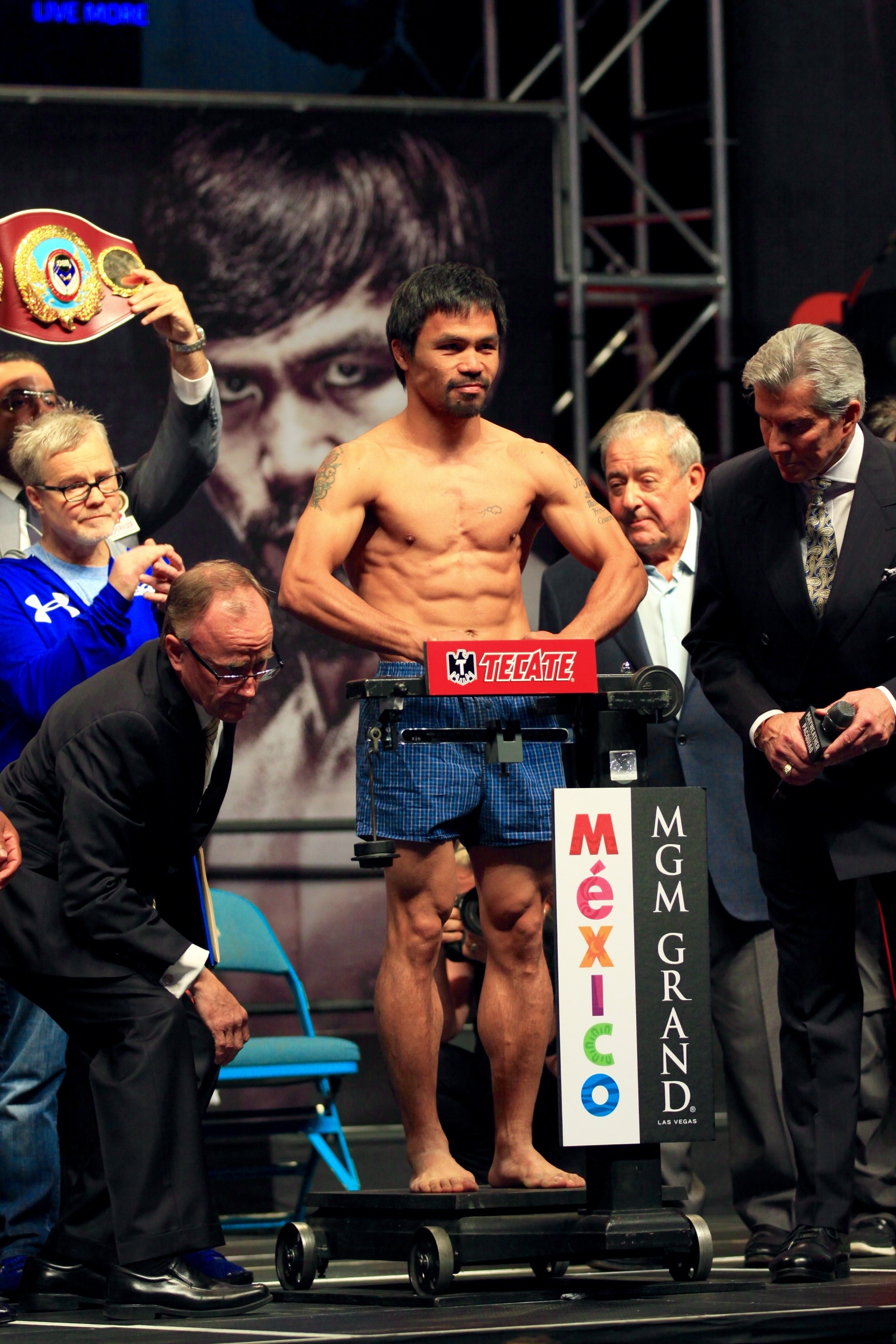
Manny Pacquiao weigh-in

Weight cutting is the practice of fast weight loss prior to a sporting competition. It most frequently happens in order to qualify for a lower weight class or to meet the maximum weight limit in their weight class if one exists (usually in combat sports or rowing, where weight is a significant advantage) or in sports where it is advantageous to weigh as little as possible (most notably equestrian sports).

There are two types of weight cutting: one method is to lose weight in the form of fat and muscle in the weeks prior to an event; the other is to lose weight in the form of water in the final days before competition. Common methods to cut weight include restricting food intake, water-loading, and perspiration through exercise, wearing a sweatsuit, and/or sitting in a sauna. Nutritional experts rarely give advice on how to cut weight safely or effectively, and recommend against cutting weight; however, many athletes choose to do it because they wish to gain an advantage in their sport.

== Weight cutting in combat sports ==
Weight cutting has been known as "dangerous" when losing large amounts of weight in a short period of time by using a sauna, wearing a sweat suit, by severely dehydrating, and "water loading".

In December 2015, 21-year-old Chinese mixed martial artist Yang Jian Bing died due to dehydration when weight-cutting for a fight put on by Singapore-based ONE Championship. ONE Championship banned weight-cutting by dehydration later that month and now holds fights based on a competitor's "walking weight", rather than pre-fight weigh-ins. The promotion's revised policy on weight mandates that athletes are monitored in their training camps, and have urine specific gravity tests to ensure they are hydrated up to three hours ahead of their bouts. The new system has been well received by athletes and other stakeholders in the MMA industry. This new implementation puts a greater emphasis on safety which is beneficial for the competing athletes.

In March 2016 Scottish Muay Thai fighter Jordan Coe died in Thailand when he was trying to cut weight for a fight. In November 2017 Australian Jessica Lindsay died after extreme weight cutting for Muay Thai fight in Perth, WA. Belfast-born acute care physician Paddy Golden has warned the Combat Sports Commission in Western Australia about the risks of weight cutting. In December 2017, Golden stated that putting one's body through acute water loss was "very dangerous", and called for measures to tackle it across Australia. In June 2018 Dr Golden stated that unless regulation is put in place to stop extreme weight cutting, deaths were "inevitable". At the end of 2017, it was reported that Golden had called for athletes to undergo hydration tests, which would dictate whether they should be allowed to participate in bouts.

Some state athletic commissions have suspended fighters who have been caught cutting weight in an unhealthy manner. For instance, the Mohegan Tribe Department of Athletic Regulation suspended Adam Piccolotti for six months after he posted a video of himself vomiting in an attempt to cut weight prior to Bellator 274; he was also fined $2,500, although the outcome of the match was not overturned.

== Dieting ==
In addition to improving performance through healthy eating, some athletes will seek to lose weight through dieting and aerobic exercise. By losing fat, they hope to achieve a higher "strength-to-mass ratio" or "lean weight". This means more muscle and less fat, and should theoretically give them an advantage against other athletes of the same weight. Dieting is a common way for combat athletes to lower their weight in order to make their desired weight class.

== See also ==
- Human weight
- Weight loss
- Eating disorder
- Dieting
- Healthy eating
- Dehydration
- Rehydration
- Aerobic exercise
- Strength training
