= British Lightweight Championship =

The British Lightweight Championship is a top British wrestling championship found throughout the country's circuit. The title's broken history dates back to the 1930s and it has most recently been claimed actively since 2021 under the auspices of Rumble Promotions who have named their version in honour of late referee Mal Mason. The official upper weight limit for the belt is 11 stone (154 pounds).

The championship was recognised and defended on matches screened by UK national television network ITV as part of the professional wrestling slot on World of Sport as well as standalone broadcasts. Pre-publicity for these championship match broadcasts was given in ITV's nationally published listings magazine TVTimes.

This is a history of the title from its earliest recorded origins in 1933. As indicated in the table a few claimed reigns are of dubious provenance and, whilst these have been noted, they are not included as official reigns.

== Title history ==
Key

Symbol	Meaning
No.	The overall championship reign
Reign	The reign number for the specific wrestler listed.
Event	The event in which the championship changed hands
N/A	The specific information is not known
—	Used for vacated reigns in order to not count it as an official reign
[Note]	Indicates that the exact length of the title reign is unknown, with a note providing more details.

No.	Champion	Reign	Date	Days held	Location	Event	Notes	Ref.
1	George de Relwyskow	1	1933	(Note: The length of the championship is too uncertain to calculate.)	(Note: The location of the match was not captured as part of the documentation.)	Live event		
—	Vacated	—	1940-1945	—	N/A	N/A	Championship vacated after Relwyskow is injured during the Second World War.	
2	Joe Reid	1	1948			Live event		
3	Jack Dempsey	1	1948		Middlesbrough	Live event		
4	George Kidd	1	1948			Live event		
5	Alan Colbeck	1	1949			Live event		
6	Johnny Stead	1	1950			Live event		
7	Eric Sands	1	30 April 1953	313	Middlesbrough	Live event		
8	Johnny Stead	2	9 March 1954		London	Live event		
9	Melwyn Rees	1	before December 1958			Live event	Legacy from Stead uncertain	
10	Jim Breaks	1	16 October 1963	1,218	London	Live event		
11	Alan Miquet	1	15 February 1967	671	London	Live event		
12	Jim Breaks	2	17 December 1968	183	Leeds	Live event		
13	Zoltan Boscik	1	18 June 1969	692	Sheffield	Live event		
14	Jon Cortez	2	9 June 1970		Aberdeen	Live event		
15	Zoltan Boscik	2	4 August 1970	692	Aberdeen	Live event		
16	Johnny Saint	1	12 May 1971	101	Sheffield	Live event		
17	Jim Breaks	3	21 August 1971	1,001	Manchester	Live event		
18	Bobby Ryan	1	18 May 1974	28	Hanley, Staffordshire	Live event		
19	Jim Breaks	4	15 June 1974		Hanley, Staffordshire	Live event		
20	Dynamite Kid	1	23 March 1977		Manchester	Live event		
—	Vacated	—	1979	—	N/A	N/A	Championship vacated after Dynamite Kid won the British Welterweight Championship	
21	Steve Grey	1	5 April 1978	448	Blackburn	Live event	Defeated Bobby Ryan in a tournament final.	
22	Jim Breaks	8	6 April 1982	49	Wolverhampton	Live event		
23	Steve Grey	3	25 May 1982	331	Croydon	Live event		
24	Jim Breaks	9	21 April 1983	13	Colne	Live event		
25	Steve Grey	4	4 May 1983	323	Bradford	Live event		
26	Kid McCoy	1	7 May 1987	1,126	Adwick le Street	Live event		
—	Vacated	—	After 6 June 1990	—	N/A	N/A	Championship vacated Kid McCoy leaves All Star Wrestling.	
27	Steve Grey	6	25 October 1990		Southampton	Live event	Defeated Boz Berry in the final of a tournament for the vacant championship	
28	Jimmy Ocean	1	3 September 1991	15	Croydon	Live event		
29	Tony Stewart	2	18 September 1991	15	unknown	Live event		
30	Jimmy Ocean	1	17 July 1993	15	unknown	Live event		
31	Steve Grey	7	October 1993			Live event	Still defending championship as of 1 July 2002 Only relinquishes claim on retirement (see below)	
—	Vacated	—	2020	—	N/A	N/A	Championship vacated after Steve Grey retired. Rumble Promotions with Grey's approval, held a 2021 tournament for a new champion in memory of referee Mal Mason.	
32	Nino Bryant	1	29 October 2021	1,556+	Sittingbourne, Kent	Live event	Defeated Lewis Mayhew in final of tournament for vacant title renamed Mal Mason British Lightweight Title. (Grey was originally due to be special referee for this match)	

== See also ==
- Professional wrestling in the United Kingdom
