= All-in professional wrestling =

First wave of professional wrestling in the United Kingdom

All-in wrestling was both a style of professional wrestling that emerged in the United Kingdom in the Interwar period as well as a term that came to describe professional wrestling in general during the 1930s and 1940s in the United Kingdom. As a style, "All-in" referred to a style that hybridised catch as catch can and other forms of British folk amateur wrestling with the emerging performances and showmanship of professional wrestling. Unlike Olympic freestyle wrestling, "All In" professional wrestling was presented as "no holds barred".

The term "All In" later became synonymous with more anarchic professional wrestling shows, leading to censure by local authorities by the late 1930s. Consequently, the "All In" label was disowned by most British wrestling promoters following the adoption of the 1947 Mountevans rules. Nevertheless, the term still lingered for many years afterwards amongst the media and the public.

== History ==
A professional wrestling match between Atholl Oakeley and "Bulldog" Bill Garnon, circa the early 1930s in London, England. In this match, Oakley and Garnon emphasise a grappling-based style intended to suggest the match is a legitimate wrestling contest rather than a performance.

Professional wrestling in the Greco Roman style had enjoyed considerable popularity in Britain during the Edwardian era, but had dwindled and died out by the outbreak of World War I. While various styles of amateur wrestling continued as legitimate sports, grappling as a promotional business did not return to Britain until the beginning of the 1930s when the success of the more worked aspects of professional wrestling in America, like gimmickry and showmanship, were introduced to British wrestling.

It was with this revival that the more submission-based Catch As Catch Can wrestling style, which had already replaced Greco Roman wrestling as the dominant style of professional wrestling in the United States back in the 1890s, became the new dominant style in Britain. With Lancashire catch-as-catch-can already a major amateur sport particularly in Northern England, there existed a ready-made source of potential recruits to professional wrestling.

Amateur wrestler Sir Atholl Oakeley got together with fellow grappler Henry Irslinger to launch one of the first promotions to employ the new style of wrestling which was coined "All-in" wrestling. Though, like many wrestlers throughout the business, Oakley would claim his wrestling was entirely legitimate, his claim was highly dubious. According to Pro Wrestling Press, Under the British Wrestling Association banner, Oakley's promotion took off with wrestlers such as Tommy Mann, Black Butcher Johnson, Jack Pye, Norman the Butcher, College Boy, and Jack Sherry on the roster, while Oakley himself would win a series of matches to be crowned the first British Heavyweight Champion.

The business was reaching one of its highest points at the time, with the best part of forty regular venues in London alone. The 1930s craze for 'All in' wrestling went by the wayside when quality was sacrificed for quantity. The great demand for wrestling, however, meant there were not enough skilled amateurs to go around, and many promoters switched to more violent styles, with weapons and chairshots part of the proceedings. Women wrestlers and mud-filled rings also became common place. In the late 1930s, the London County Council banned professional wrestling, leaving the business in rough shape just before World War II. Permits were also revoked in Johannesburg, South Africa in 1938. In April 1938, Justice Charles of the King's Bench Division in London declared that it was "not a sport."

After the war, attempts to relaunch the business in 1947 failed to catch on with journalists who condemned the gimmickry calling the show fake. The revelation of this, and the general chaos which had surrounded All In Wrestling prior to the War, prompted Admiral Lord Mountevans, a fan of the sport, to get together with Commander Campbell (a member of the popular "The Brains Trust" radio panel show), member of parliament Maurice Webb and Olympic wrestler Norman Morell to create a committee to produce official rules for wrestling. Subsequently, the term All In was largely disowned by British promoters, who now referred to their style of wrestling as Modern Freestyle.

== In popular culture ==
Despite the rejection of the name "All In" by British wrestling promoters, the term continued to be used in the UK to refer to professional wrestling - often in a derogatory sense by non-fans. An example of its use in this context is in the Monty Python's Flying Circus sketch "All In Cricket" which depicts two cricketers dueling with cricket bats in a wrestling ring.

English translations of Mythologies by Roland Barthes have frequently rendered the French term Le Catch as All In wrestling, (despite Barthes having written the book in France in the 1950s).

== See also ==
- Professional wrestling in the United Kingdom
