= British Welterweight Championship =

Professional wrestling championship

The British Welterweight Championship is the welterweight professional wrestling championship competed for throughout the British wrestling circuit.

The championship was recognised and defended on matches screened by UK national television network ITV as part of the professional wrestling slot on World of Sport as well as standalone broadcasts. Pre-publicity for these championship match broadcasts was given in ITV's nationally published listings magazine TVTimes

== History ==
A British Welterweight Championship was first set up in 1938 under All-In rules and won by Harold Angus. The Mountevans Committee in 1947 called for the establishment of a British Welterweight Title and so recognised the still-incumbent All In titleholder Angus as champion. This lineage was recognised by Joint Promotions following its 1952 formation. The title would later be transplanted to All Star Wrestling following champion Danny Collins' defection in the late 1980s, where it would remain active until the mid-1990s. In the 21st century, revivals of the title have been hosted by The Wrestling Alliance in 2000-2003 and Revolution British Wrestling in 2003-2005 before most recently being contested for in LDN's Academy/Spirit League since 2006.

The title first became recognised by RBW in August 2003, when a decider contest was held between Spud and Jack Hazard which saw Spud crowned RBW's first British Welterweight Champion. The last RBW holder would be Kid Regis who would hold the belt at the time of RBW's eventual closedown in late 2005.

Regis continued to defend the Welterweight Championship on the independent circuit, eventually losing it to Tex Benedict in 2006 in LDN, who in turn lost it to current champion Alan Travis in 2008.

== Title histories ==
This is the combined list of different versions of the British Welterweight Titles, each of which was probably the most significant version at the time. Each version may or may not be connected to another. However, all title changes are either actual or "official" unless indicated otherwise.

=== British independent circuit (1938-1953) ===
Wrestler:	Reign:	Date:	Place:	Notes:
Harold Angus	1	1938		Champion under 'All-In' rules, granted recognition as incumbent champion by Mountevans Committee in 1947. Vacated in 1948 when Angus dies following a firearms-related accident.
Mick McManus	1	1949		Defeated Eddie Capelli.
Jack Dempsey	1	1951		
Alan Colbeck	1	??/05/1952		Defeated Les Stent.

=== Joint Promotions (1953-1989) ===
Wrestler:	Reign:	Date:	Place:	Notes:
Tony Lawrence	1	1953		
Jack Dempsey	2	1953		
Mick McManus	2	05/01/1957	London	
Jack Dempsey	3	23/04/1958	London	Vacated in October 1966 when Dempsey temporarily retired due to illness.
Alan Sargeant	1	26/11/1966	Hemel Hempstead	Defeats Alan Wood in tournament final.
Jim Breaks	1	06/11/1967	Leeds	
Alan Sargeant	2	??/09/1968	N/A	
Brian Maxine	1	30/09/1969	Croydon	May have won the title earlier in the month and defend against Sarjeant on this day; vacates in June 1971 after winning the middleweight title.
Vic Faulkner	1	20/07/1971	Croydon	Defeats Adrian Street.
Jim Breaks	2	31/05/1976	Bradford	
Vic Faulkner	2	28/08/1976	Manchester	
Jim Breaks	3	09/03/1977	Buxton	
Vic Faulkner	3	05/07/1977	Leicester	Title immediately held up by Joint Promotions because of the interference by Bert Royal.
Jim Breaks	4	30/11/1977	London	Defeats Faulkner in rematch.
Dynamite Kid	1	25/01/1978	Preston	Vacant in 1979 when Kid left the country.
Jim Breaks	5	27/06/1979	London	Defeats Steve Grey in 8-man tournament final.
Alan Dennison	1	11/06/1980	London	
Jim Breaks	6	29/03/1983	Croydon	
Steve Grey	1	25/05/1982	Croydon	
Alan Dennison	2	21/06/1982	N/A	
Jim Breaks	7	29/03/1983	Croydon	May have won the title from Dennison before this date.
Alan Dennison	3	29/04/1983		
Jim Breaks	8	09/12/1983	Barnsley	
Danny Collins	1	21/03/1984	Croydon	
Steve Grey	2	21/06/1984	Malvern	
Danny Collins	2	22/06/1984	Bath	
Steve Grey	3	21/08/1984	Malvern	
Danny Collins	3	01/11/1984	Manchester	
Sid Cooper	1	23/05/1985	Bristol	
Danny Collins	4	26/08/1985		Takes title to All Star circa 1988
Title vacated on 04/07/1989 when Collins wins the heavy middleweight title.

=== All Star Wrestling (1989-1993) ===
Wrestler:	Reign:	Date:	Place:	Notes:
Mal Sanders	1	21/12/1989	Bristol	Defeated Steve Grey.
Doc Dean	1	25/10/1990	Southampton	
Blondie Barrett	1	17/12/1991	Chelmsford	
Doc Dean	2	18/07/1992	Norwich	
Steve Prince	1	09/10/1993	Croydon	May have been in October.

=== The Wrestling Alliance (2002-2003) ===
Wrestler:	Reign:	Date:	Place:	Notes:
Jonny Storm	1	17/01/2002	Southampton	Defeated Jody Fleisch.
Jody Fleisch	1	03/10/2002	Southampton	
Jonny Storm	2	27/11/2002	Plymouth	
Title abandoned with TWA's closure in 2003.

=== Revolution British Wrestling (2003-2005) ===
Wrestler:	Reign:	Date:	Place:	Notes:
Spud	1	30/08/2003		Defeated Jack Hazard in a match to be crowned first champion
Ross Jordan	1	07/12/2003		
Sammy Ray	1	27/03/2004		
Ross Jordan	2	24/07/2004	Chingford, London	
Kid Regis	1	05/02/2005	Chingford, London	
RBW closes in late 2005, Regis continued to claim title (as detailed below).

=== LDN Wrestling (2006-2009) ===
Wrestler:	Reign:	Date:	Place:	Notes:
Tex Benedict	1	04/06/2006	Walthamstow, London	Defeats Kid Regis, thus keeping continuity with RBW version
Alan Travis	1	20/09/2008	Hanley, Staffordshire	
LDN withdraws from sanctioning the championship 2009, recognises Travis as LDN Capital Champion. Travis, under Mountevans Rules, remains dormant British Welterweight champion pending further developments

== See also ==
- Professional wrestling in the United Kingdom
