= Garry Tonon =

American submission wrestler

Garry Lee Tonon
- Born: September 12, 1991 (age 35); New Jersey, United States
- Other names: The Lion Killer
- Height: 5 ft 10 in (178 cm)
- Weight: 155 lb (70 kg; 11 st 1 lb)
- Division: Lightweight (2018–present) (Note: ONE Championship refers to their 155 lb division as Featherweight, but per the Association of Boxing Commissions in the United States, 155 lbs is considered Lightweight.); Welterweight (2018) (Note: ONE Championship refers to their 170 lb division as Lightweight, but per the Association of Boxing Commissions in the United States, 170 lbs is considered Welterweight.)
- Reach: 175 cm (69 in)
- Style: Submission grappling
- Stance: Orthodox
- Team: Danaher Death Squad; Renzo Gracie Academy
- Rank: 3rd degree black belt in Brazilian jiu-jitsu

Mixed martial arts record
- Total: 11
- Wins: 9
- By knockout: 2
- By submission: 6
- By decision: 1
- Losses: 2
- By knockout: 1
- By decision: 1

Other information
- Mixed martial arts record from Sherdog

Garry Lee Tonon (born September 12, 1991) is an American submission grappler and mixed martial artist. He is a five-time Eddie Bravo Invitational champion, and has won titles at ADCC submission wrestling championship, IBJJF World and Pan American championships.

He is known for his use of leglocks in submission-only grappling matches, and is a former member of the Danaher Death Squad, a grappling team that was led by John Danaher at Renzo Gracie Academy.

While he still maintains a consistent submission grappling training schedule, since his debut in early 2018 Tonon has focused primarily on training and competing in professional mixed martial arts competition.

Tonon has background in folkstyle wrestling, holds a black belt in Brazilian jiu-jitsu under Tom DeBlass & Ricardo Almeida, and is the head instructor of Garry Tonon Jiu Jitsu in East Brunswick, New Jersey.

== Early life ==
As a child, Tonon was identified as having ADHD by his mother, an employee of a non-profit organization for children with special needs. Tonon had his first introduction to grappling when he joined the wrestling team at his school in 5th grade. Tonon continued to wrestle for several more years, through his freshman year of high school. Tonon has credited wrestling & martial arts with helping him to cope with his ADHD, and partially attributes his particular style of grappling to the disorder. Tonon would also be later diagnosed with alopecia areata, a non-life-threatening condition in which hair is lost from some or all areas of the body. He attended Lacey Township High School in Lacey Township, New Jersey, where he later graduated in 2009.

At age 14, a friend decided to bring Tonon to a local jiu-jitsu tournament, which interested Tonon. He soon began taking classes at his friend's jiu-jitsu academy, but lost interest after several months due to the school's focus on mixed martial arts, as opposed to jiu-jitsu. Shortly after leaving that school, Tonon found an advertisement for Tom DeBlass' academy, Ocean County Brazilian Jiu-Jitsu, and decided to continue his training there. While still attending high school, Tonon would consistently attend two classes per day at DeBlass' academy. DeBlass, noticing Tonon's interest in the sport, began bringing Tonon to Ricardo Almeida's academy for additional training.

== Grappling career ==
In 2008, after about a year of consistent jiu-jitsu training with DeBlass and Almeida, Tonon won his first title at the IBJJF World Championships in the Blue Belt Juvenile Division. After graduating high school in 2009, Tonon began pursuing a degree in exercise science at Rutgers University. While studying at Rutgers, Tonon maintained a rigorous training schedule and continued to compete in both local and international competitions, mostly competing in the gi for the first 5 years of his training, but later beginning to seek out more specialized, no-gi instruction from John Danaher. He was awarded his black belt by Tom DeBlass and Ricardo Almeida in September 2013. One month later, Tonon went on to compete for the first time in the ADCC Submission Wrestling World Championship in Beijing, China, where he had matches with Kron Gracie, Marcus Almeida, Roberto "Cyborg" Abreu, and Satoru Kitaoka.

From 2013 to 2017, Tonon went on to compete in numerous jiu-jitsu competitions as a black belt, including the IBJJF World & Pan American Championships, Eddie Bravo Invitational, Metamoris, Grapplers Quest, North American Grappling Association (NAGA), Kasai Grappling, Polaris Pro Grappling, ADCC Submission Wrestling World Championship, and others. His most notable wins include matches against AJ Agazarm, Joao Miyao, Dillon Danis, Ralek Gracie, and Vinny Magalhaes.

Tonon was booked to compete against Tye Ruotolo at ONE 157 on May 20, 2022 in a submission grappling match. Tonon was submitted with a D'arce choke and lost the match.

As a former medallist, Tonon was invited to compete at the 2022 ADCC World Championship. Prior to the event, Tonon decided to move down in weight to the under 66 kg division. He lost on points to Sam McNally in the opening round and was eliminated from the tournament.

Tonon was invited to compete in the under 77 kg division at the 2024 ADCC World Championship. He was submitted by Mateusz Szczecinski in the opening round.

== Mixed martial arts career ==
=== ONE Championship ===
In March 2018, Tonon made his professional mixed martial arts debut against Richard Corminal at ONE Championship: Iron Will, in Bangkok, Thailand. Tonon won the fight via TKO in the second round. Tonon had his second professional fight against Rahul Raju at ONE Championship: Reign of Kings on July 27, 2018. Tonon won the fight via rear naked choke in the third round. In November 2018, Tonon went on to fight Sung Jong Lee at ONE Championship: Heart of the Lion. Tonon won via guillotine choke in the second round.

On March 31, 2019, Tonon continued his winning streak and fought Anthony Engelen at ONE Championship: A New Era. Tonon won via TKO in the first round. In May, Tonon faced Yoshiki Nakahara at ONE Championship: Enter the Dragon He won the fight via a heel hook submission in the first round.

Garry Tonon was scheduled to face Koyomi Matsushima at ONE Championship: Inside the Matrix 4 on November 20, 2020. The bout was subsequently rescheduled for ONE Championship: Big Bang on December 4, 2020 and it was confirmed that he would have to compete without his coach, John Danaher, in his corner for the first time due to travel restrictions in place in Singapore. Tonon was unable to finish as Matsushima defended his submissions, but secured the unanimous decision victory to earn the first decision win of his mixed martial arts career.

Tonon was scheduled to face reigning champion Thanh Le for the ONE Featherweight Championship at ONE: X on December 5, 2021. In late October 2021, the promotion announced that the event was postponed due to the COVID-19 pandemic. His title fight with Le was rebooked for ONE: Lights Out on March 11, 2022. While attempting a heel hook, Tonon was caught by a hammer fist and lost by first-round knockout, handing him his first career MMA loss.

Tonon faced Johnny Nuñez on January 14, 2023, at ONE Fight Night 6. He won the fight via a kimura submission in the first round.

Tonon faced Shamil Gasanov on July 15, 2023, at ONE Fight Night 12. He submitted Gasanov with a kneebar in the second round and earned a Performance of the Night bonus.

Tonon faced Martin Nguyen on January 28, 2024, at ONE 165. He won the match by rear-naked submission in the first round and earned a $50,000 'Performance of the Night' bonus.

Tonon next faced Shamil Gasanov in a rematch at ONE Fight Night 34 on August 1, 2025. He lost the fight by decision.

On April 24, 2026, it was announced that Tonon was no longer under contract with ONE Championship.

== Championships and accomplishments ==
=== Mixed martial arts ===
- ONE Championship
  - Performance of the Night (Two times) vs. Shamil Gasanov and Martin Nguyen

=== Submission grappling ===
- Abu Dhabi Combat Club (ADCC)
  - 2019 ADCC World Championship 3rd place (-77 kg)
- Eddie Bravo Invitational (EBI)
  - Eddie Bravo Invitational 11 (-155 lbs)
  - Eddie Bravo Invitational 9 (-205 lbs)
  - Eddie Bravo Invitational 5 (-155 lbs)
  - Eddie Bravo Invitational 3 (-170 lbs)
  - Eddie Bravo Invitational 1 (-170 lbs)
- Grapplers Quest
  - 2015 All-Star Pro 1st place (-77 kg)
- International Brazilian Jiu-Jitsu Federation (IBJJF)
  - 2015 Pan Jiu-Jitsu No-Gi Championship 1st place (-73.5 kg), 2nd place (absolute)
- JitsMagazine
  - BJJ Awards - Match of the Year vs. Dante Leon.
- Other
  - BJJ Kumite (Brown belt, no-gi)

== Mixed martial arts record ==
Professional record breakdown
11 matches	9 wins	2 losses
By knockout	2	1
By submission	6	0
By decision	1	1

Res.	Record	Opponent	Method	Event	Date	Round	Time	Location	Notes
Loss	9–2	Shamil Gasanov	Decision (unanimous)	ONE Fight Night 34	August 2, 2025	3	5:00	Bangkok, Thailand	
Win	9–1	Martin Nguyen	Submission (rear-naked choke)	ONE 165	January 28, 2024	1	4:41	Tokyo, Japan	Performance of the Night.
Win	8–1	Shamil Gasanov	Submission (kneebar)	ONE Fight Night 12	July 15, 2023	2	2:26	Bangkok, Thailand	Performance of the Night.
Win	7–1	Johnny Nuñez	Submission (kimura)	ONE Fight Night 6	January 14, 2023	1	1:53	Bangkok, Thailand	
Loss	6–1	Thanh Le	KO (punches)	ONE: Lights Out	March 11, 2022	1	0:56	Kallang, Singapore	For the ONE Featherweight Championship (155 lb).
Win	6–0	Koyomi Matsushima	Decision (unanimous)	ONE: Big Bang	December 4, 2020	3	5:00	Kallang, Singapore	
Win	5–0	Yoshiki Nakahara	Submission (heel hook)	ONE: Enter the Dragon	May 17, 2019	1	0:55	Kallang, Singapore	
Win	4–0	Anthony Engelen	TKO (punches)	ONE: A New Era	March 31, 2019	1	4:12	Tokyo, Japan	
Win	3–0	Lee Sung-jong	Submission (guillotine choke)	ONE: Heart of the Lion	November 9, 2018	2	2:04	Kallang, Singapore	Lightweight debut.
Win	2–0	Rahul Raju	Submission (rear-naked choke)	ONE: Reign of Kings	July 27, 2018	3	3:27	Pasay, Philippines	
Win	1–0	Richard Corminal	TKO (punches and elbows)	ONE: Iron Will	March 24, 2018	2	3:40	Bangkok, Thailand	Welterweight debut.

== Submission grappling record ==
Professional record breakdown
96 matches	71 wins	23 losses
By submission	53	12
By decision	17	11
By disqualification	1	0
Draws	2	

Result	Opponent	Method	Event	Division	Date	Location
Loss	(Republic of Ireland) Sam McNally	Points (3-0)	ADCC 2022	–66 kg	September 17, 2022	(United States) Las Vegas, NV
Loss	(United States) Tye Ruotolo	Submission (D'Arce choke)	ONE 157	–77 kg	May 20, 2022	Kallang, Singapore
Win	(Canada) Dante Leon	Referee Decision	WNO 3	Superfight	August 1, 2020	(United States) Austin, TX
Win	(Brazil) Osvaldo Moizinho	Submission (heel hook)	F2W 145	Superfight	June 26, 2020	(United States) Dallas, TX
Win	(Brazil) Davi Ramos	Referee Decision	F2W Pro 132	Superfight	November 23, 2019	(United States) Honolulu, HI
Loss	(United States) Gordon Ryan	Submission (rear naked choke)	ADCC 2019	Absolute	September 29, 2019	(United States) Anaheim, CA
Win	(United States) Edwin Najmi	Submission (heel hook)	ADCC 2019	Absolute	September 29, 2019	(United States) Anaheim, CA
Win	(Canada) Dante Leon	Submission (heel hook)	ADCC 2019	-77 kg	September 28, 2019	(United States) Anaheim, CA
Loss	(United States) JT Torres	Points (2-0)	ADCC 2019	-77 kg	September 28, 2019	(United States) Anaheim, CA
Win	(Brazil) Renato Canuto	Points (0-0)	ADCC 2019	-77 kg	September 28, 2019	(United States) Anaheim, CA
Win	(Poland) Mateusz Gamrot	Submission (rear naked choke)	ADCC 2019	-77 kg	September 28, 2019	(United States) Anaheim, CA
Loss	(United States) Gianni Grippo	Points (4-6)	Kasai Pro	-70 kg	December 9, 2017	(United States) Brooklyn, NY
Loss	(Brazil) Renato Canuto	Points (0-2)	Kasai Pro	-70 kg	December 9, 2017	(United States) Brooklyn, NY
Win	(United States) AJ Agazarm	Points (2-0)	Kasai Pro	-70 kg	December 9, 2017	(United States) Brooklyn, NY
Draw	(United States) Mansher Khera	Draw	Kasai Pro	-70 kg	December 9, 2017	(United States) Brooklyn, NY
Win	(Brazil) Vagner Rocha	Submission (heel hook)	EBI 13	-155 lbs	October 22, 2017	(United States) Los Angeles, CA
Win	(Brazil) Lucas Valente	Submission (heel hook)	EBI 13	-155 lbs	October 22, 2017	(United States) Los Angeles, CA
Win	(United States) Ross Keeping	Submission (armbar)	EBI 13	-155 lbs	October 22, 2017	(United States) Los Angeles, CA
Win	(United States) Chance Braud	Submission (heel hook)	EBI 13	-155 lbs	October 22, 2017	(United States) Los Angeles, CA
Loss	(Brazil) Vagner Rocha	Points (0-2)	ADCC 2017	-155 lbs	September 24, 2017	(Finland) Espoo
Loss	(United States) JT Torres	Referee Decision	ADCC 2017	-155 lbs	September 24, 2017	(Finland) Espoo
Win	(Brazil) Marcelo Mafra	Penalty	ADCC 2017	-155 lbs	September 23, 2017	(Finland) Espoo
Win	(Brazil) Felipe Cesar	Points (2-0)	ADCC 2017	-155 lbs	September 23, 2017	(Finland) Espoo
Win	(United States) Dillon Danis	Judges Decision	Polaris 5	-81 kg	August 19, 2017	(United Kingdom) London
Win	(Japan) Shinya Aoki	Submission (heel hook)	ONE 54	-81 kg	May 26, 2017	Singapore
Win	(United States) Justin Rader	Judges Decision	F2W Pro 28	Superfight	March 24, 2017	(United States) Oklahoma City, OK
Win	(United States) AJ Agazarm	Judges Decision	F2W Pro 24	Superfight	February 3, 2017	(United States) Huntington Beach, CA
Loss	(Brazil) Antônio Carlos Júnior	Submission (triangle choke)	Submission Underground 3	Superfight	January 29, 2017	(United States) Portland, OR
Win	(Brazil) Kim Terra	Submission (guillotine choke)	Studio 540	Superfight	December 17, 2016	(United States) Solana Beach, CA
Win	(Brazil) Vinny Magalhães	Fastest Escape	EBI 9	-205 lbs	November 7, 2016	(United States) Los Angeles, CA
Win	(United States) Daniel O'Brien	Fastest Escape	EBI 9	-205 lbs	November 7, 2016	(United States) Los Angeles, CA
Win	(United States) Adam Sanchoff	Submission (heel hook)	EBI 9	-205 lbs	November 7, 2016	(United States) Los Angeles, CA
Win	(United States) JJ Friedrich	Submission (heel hook)	EBI 9	-205 lbs	November 7, 2016	(United States) Los Angeles, CA
Win	(Brazil) Gilbert Burns	Submission (heel hook)	Polaris 4	Superfight	October 29, 2016	(United Kingdom) London
Win	(United States) Enrico Cocco	Submission {heel hook)	Grappling Pro	-77 kg	September 18, 2016	(United States) Naples, FL
Win	(United States) DJ Jackson	Points (2-7)	Grappling Pro	-77 kg	September 18, 2016	(United States) Naples, FL
Win	(United States) Hunter Ewald	Technical Submission {injury)	Grappling Pro	-77 kg	September 18, 2016	(United States) Naples, FL
Win	(United States) Dustin Akbari	Submission (heel hook)	F2W Pro 8	Superfight	July 23, 2017	(United States) San Francisco, CA
Win	(Brazil) Ralek Gracie	Submission (kneebar)	Metamoris 7	Superfight	July 17, 2017	(United States) Los Angeles, CA
Loss	(Brazil) Yuri Simões	Fastest Escape	EBI 6	Absolute	April 24, 2016	(United States) Los Angeles, CA
Win	(Brazil) Felipe Fogolin	Submission (heel hook)	EBI 6	Absolute	April 24, 2016	(United States) Los Angeles, CA
Draw	(Brazil) Rousimar Palhares	Draw	Polaris 3	Superfight	April 2, 2016	(United Kingdom) Poole
Win	(United States) Rafael Domingos	Submission (heel hook)	EBI 5	-155 lbs	December 13, 2015	(United States) Los Angeles, CA
Win	(Australia) Lachlan Gilles	Submission (armbar)	EBI 5	-155 lbs	December 13, 2015	(United States) Los Angeles, CA
Win	(Cuba) Javier Vazquez	Submission (heel hook)	EBI 5	-155 lbs	December 13, 2015	(United States) Los Angeles, CA
Win	(United States) Stephan Martinez	Submission (bulldog choke)	EBI 5	-155 lbs	December 13, 2015	(United States) Los Angeles, CA
Win	(Japan) Masakazu Imanari	Submission (heel hook)	Polaris 2	Superfight	September 12, 2015	(United Kingdom) Cardiff
Loss	(Brazil) Matheus Diniz	Points (0-4)	Nogi World Championships	Absolute	November 8, 2015	(United States) Long Beach, CA
Win	(Brazil) Marcel Gonçalves	Disqualification	Nogi World Championships	Absolute	November 8, 2015	(United States) Long Beach, CA
Loss	(Brazil) Michael Langhi	Points (2-4)	Nogi World Championships	-73.5 kg	November 8, 2015	(United States) Long Beach, CA
Loss	(Brazil) Matheus Diniz	Submission (wristlock)	Nogi Pan Championships	Absolute	October 3, 2015	(United States) New York City, NY
Win	(United States) Gianni Grippo	Advantages	Nogi Pan Championships	Absolute	October 3, 2015	(United States) New York City, NY
Win	(Brazil) Washington Luis	Submission (darce choke)	Nogi Pan Championships	Absolute	October 3, 2015	(United States) New York City, NY
Win	(Brazil) Rodrigo Freitas	Points (7-2)	Nogi Pan Championships	-73.5 kg	October 3, 2015	(United States) New York City, NY
Win	(United States) Renan Borges	Submission (kneebar)	Nogi Pan Championships	-73.5 kg	October 3, 2015	(United States) New York City, NY
Win	(United States) João Ferreira	Points	Nogi Pan Championships	-73.5 kg	October 3, 2015	(United States) New York City, NY
Loss	(Brazil) Vinny Magalhães	Referee Decision	ADCC 2015	Absolute	September 30, 2015	(Brazil) São Paulo
Loss	(Brazil) Lucas Lepri	Points (0-10)	ADCC 2015	-77 kg	September 29, 2015	(Brazil) São Paulo
Win	(United States) Dillon Danis	Submission (heel hook)	ADCC 2015	-77 kg	September 29, 2015	(Brazil) São Paulo
Win	(Brazil) João Miyao	Judges Decision	FIVE Super League	Superfight	August 8, 2015	(United States) New York City, NY
Win	(United States) Rob Greenidge	Submission (calf slicer)	Grapplers Quest: All Star Pro	-77 kg	June 6, 2015	(United States) Edison, NJ
Win	(United States) Joe Solecki	Submission (heel hook)	Grapplers Quest: All Star Pro	-77 kg	June 6, 2015	(United States) Edison, NJ
Win	(United States) Jordan Tabor	Submission (guillotine choke)	Grapplers Quest: All Star Pro	-77 kg	June 6, 2015	(United States) Edison, NJ
Win	(United States) Josh Hinger	Fastest Escape	EBI 3	-170 lbs	March 22, 2015	(United States) Los Angeles, CA
Win	(United States) Eddie Cummings	Submission (triangle armbar)	EBI 3	-170 lbs	March 22, 2015	(United States) Los Angeles, CA
Win	(Armenia) Karen Darabedyan	Fastest Escape	EBI 3	-170 lbs	March 22, 2015	(United States) Los Angeles, CA
Win	(United States) Josh Valles	Submission (heel hook)	EBI 3	-170 lbs	March 22, 2015	(United States) Los Angeles, CA
Win	(Cuba) Javier Vazquez	Submission (triangle choke)	Gracie Nationals	Superfight	February 8, 2015	(United States) Los Angeles, CA
Win	(Poland) Marcin Held	Submission (heel hook)	Polaris 1	Superfight	January 10, 2015	(United Kingdom) Cardiff
Win	(United States) Zak Maxwell	Submission (heel hook)	Metamoris 5	Superfight	November 22, 2014	(United States) Los Angeles, CA
Win	(Australia) Kit Dale	Submission (guillotine choke)	Metamoris 4	Superfight	August 9, 2014	(United States) Los Angeles, CA
Win	(United States) Richie Martinez	Submission (heel hook)	EBI 1	-170 lbs	June 1, 2014	(United States) Los Angeles, CA
Win	(United States) Javier Valenciano	Submission (heel hook)	EBI 1	-170 lbs	June 1, 2014	(United States) Los Angeles, CA
Win	(United States) Lance Glynn	Submission (heel hook)	EBI 1	-170 lbs	June 1, 2014	(United States) Los Angeles, CA
Win	(United States) PJ Linder	Submission (rear naked choke)	EBI 1	-170 lbs	June 1, 2014	(United States) Los Angeles, CA
Loss	(Brazil) Marcus Almeida	Points	ADCC 2013	Absolute	October 20, 2013	(China) Beijing
Loss	(Brazil) Roberto Abreu	Points	ADCC 2013	Absolute	October 20, 2013	(China) Beijing
Loss	(Brazil) Kron Gracie	Submission (rear naked choke)	ADCC 2013	-77 kg	October 19, 2013	(China) Beijing
Win	(Japan) Satoru Kitaoka	Submission (rear naked choke)	ADCC 2013	-77 kg	October 19, 2013	(China) Beijing
Loss	(United States) Keenan Cornelius	Submission (triangle choke)	BJJ Kumite (Brown Belt)	Absolute	December, 2012	(United States) Washington, D.C.
Win	(United States) AJ Agazarm	Submission (rear naked choke)	BJJ Kumite (Brown Belt)	Absolute	December, 2012	(United States) Washington, D.C.
Win	(United States) AJ Agazarm	Submission (shoulder lock)	BJJ Kumite (Brown Belt)	Absolute	December, 2012	(United States) Washington, D.C.
Win	(Mexico) Wero Salazar	Submission (kimura)	BJJ Kumite (Brown Belt)	Absolute	December, 2012	(United States) Washington, D.C.
Win	(Mexico) Wero Salazar	Submission (rear naked choke)	BJJ Kumite (Brown Belt)	Absolute	December, 2012	(United States) Washington, D.C.
Loss	(United States) Sean Roberts	Submission (armbar)	BJJ Kumite (Brown Belt)	Absolute	December, 2012	(United States) Washington, D.C.
Win	(United States) Sean Roberts	Submission (toe hold)	BJJ Kumite (Brown Belt)	Absolute	December, 2012	(United States) Washington, D.C.
Win	(Switzerland) Ilke Bulut	Submission (rear naked choke)	BJJ Kumite (Brown Belt)	Absolute	December, 2012	(United States) Washington, D.C.
Win	(Switzerland) Ilke Bulut	Submission (toe hold)	BJJ Kumite (Brown Belt)	Absolute	December, 2012	(United States) Washington, D.C.
Win	(Italy) Luca Ancoreta	Submission (heel hook)	BJJ Kumite (Brown Belt)	Absolute	December, 2012	(United States) Washington, D.C.
Win	(Italy) Luca Ancoreta	Submission (rear naked choke)	BJJ Kumite (Brown Belt)	Absolute	December, 2012	(United States) Washington, D.C.
Loss	(United States) AJ Souza	Submission (armbar)	BJJ Kumite (Brown Belt)	Absolute	December, 2012	(United States) Washington, D.C.
Win	(United States) AJ Souza	Submission (rear naked choke)	BJJ Kumite (Brown Belt)	Absolute	December, 2012	(United States) Washington, D.C.
Win	(Republic of Ireland) Darragh O'Conail	Submission (rear naked choke)	BJJ Kumite (Brown Belt)	Absolute	December, 2012	(United States) Washington, D.C.
Loss	(Republic of Ireland) Darragh O'Conail	Submission (guillotine choke)	BJJ Kumite (Brown Belt)	Absolute	December, 2012	(United States) Washington, D.C.
Win	(Brazil) Vitor Silveiro	Submission (rear naked choke)	BJJ Kumite (Brown Belt)	Absolute	December, 2012	(United States) Washington, D.C.
Win	(Brazil) Vitor Silveiro	Submission (ankle lock)	BJJ Kumite (Brown Belt)	Absolute	December, 2012	(United States) Washington, D.C.
Loss	(United States) Keenan Cornelius	Submission (armbar)	BJJ Kumite (Brown Belt)	Absolute	December, 2012	(United States) Washington, D.C.
Loss	(United States) Keenan Cornelius	Submission (armbar)	BJJ Kumite (Brown Belt)	Absolute	December, 2012	(United States) Washington, D.C.
