= Kron Gracie =

Brazilian Jiu-Jitsu practitioner and mixed martial artist (born 1988)

- Born: Kron Stavik Gracie; July 11, 1988 (age 38); Rio de Janeiro, Brazil
- Nationality: Brazilian / American
- Height: 5 ft 9 in (1.75 m)
- Weight: 145 lb (66 kg; 10.4 st)
- Division: Middleweight (BJJ); Lightweight (BJJ); Featherweight (MMA)
- Reach: 70 in (180 cm)
- Style: Brazilian Jiu-Jitsu
- Fighting out of: Los Angeles, California, U.S.
- Team: Kron Gracie Jiu-Jitsu; Cesar Gracie Jiu-Jitsu; Rickson Gracie Jiu-Jitsu; Gracie Humaita
- Teacher: Rickson Gracie
- Trainer: Nate Diaz Nick Diaz
- Rank: Black belt in BJJ; Black belt in Judo
- Years active: 2014–present (MMA)

Mixed martial arts record
- Total: 8
- Wins: 5
- By submission: 5
- Losses: 3
- By knockout: 1
- By decision: 2

Other information
- Notable relatives: Gracie Family
- Website: www.krongraciejiujitsu.com
- Mixed martial arts record from Sherdog

Kron Stavik Gracie (born July 11, 1988) is a Brazilian and American mixed martial artist, submission grappler, and instructor. He previously competed in the Featherweight division of the Ultimate Fighting Championship.

A member of the Gracie family of Brazilian jiu-jitsu, he is the son of 9th deg. BJJ red belt Rickson Gracie and a grandson of BJJ co-founder Hélio Gracie. Training jiu-jitsu from a very young age Gracie became a two-time IBJJF World champion and four-time Pan-American champion before receiving his black belt at the age of 19. By 2008 Gracie held a record of 51 consecutive matches won by submission at high level tournaments. After medalling at the Pan-American championship, Gracie became European champion in 2009, World championship silver medallist in 2011 and in 2013 ADCC Submission Fighting World Champion.

== Early life ==
Gracie was born in Rio de Janeiro, Brazil the youngest son of Brazilian Jiu-Jitsu (BJJ) master Rickson Gracie but lived most of his life in Los Angeles after his father moved to California in 1989. He began his BJJ training under his father as a child, winning his first competition as a yellow belt at the age of ten. Kron is the youngest of four children to Rickson Gracie and grandson of the late Helio Gracie. He has two older sisters Kauan and Kaulin, his older brother Rockson died in 2000.

== Brazilian jiu-jitsu career ==
=== 2005–2007: First world and Pan Am championships titles ===
At the age of 16, competing as a blue belt in the Adult lightweight division, Gracie won the 2004 IBJJF American National Jiu-Jitsu Championship. After receiving his purple belt Gracie won the 2005 Pan Championship then in 2006, Gracie won both the IBJJF World Championship and the CBJJO World Jiu-Jitsu Cup. Competing in grappling Gracie won the 2006 NAGA Championship in the Adult Lightweight Division. The following year as a brown belt, he became world champion for the second time and Pan American champion for the fourth time winning double gold, in his division and, after defeating Tom DeBlass, in absolute (aka open class). At that point Gracie held a record 51-match submission streak.

=== 2008–2010: Black belt, European champion, ADCC medallist ===
In 2008, at the age of 19, Gracie was promoted to black belt by his father a week before the World Championship, however Gracie was submitted by Sergio Moraes in the first match of the middleweight division. In 2009 Gracie won the European Championship after defeating Yan Cabral in the final, a few days after the death of his grandfather, Grandmaster Helio Gracie, he then won silver at the 2009 Pan Championship in the middleweight division after losing by points in the final against Lucas Leite. At the 2009 Abu Dhabi Combat Club (ADCC) grappling competition in Barcelona, the most prestigious grappling tournament in the world, Gracie lost the 77 kilograms (170 lb) Quarter-final after being submitted via mounted guillotine choke by Marcelo Garcia. Two years later Gracie won bronze at 2011 ADCC World after losing again to Marcelo Garcia in a close match after Garcia won by points. Gracie became known as "Ice Cream Kron" due to his calm demeanour when fighting.

=== 2011–2013: Superfights, ADCC World champion ===
Gracie won silver at the 2011 World Jiu-Jitsu Championship, in the lightweight division, submitting Leandro Lo then losing 9-2 to Gilbert "Durinho" Burns in the finals. At 2012 Pan Am, competing under Rickson Gracie BJJ team, Gracie won bronze in middleweight and bronze in absolute after losing in the final against ultra heavyweight Marcus "Buchecha" Almeida; that same year he became World Jiu-Jitsu Expo Superfight champion after defeating Victor Estima in a tight match won by advantage at the World Jiu Jitsu Expo in Long Beach, California. In October 2012 Gracie participated in a Gi Superfight at Metamoris 1 in San Diego, submitting Otávio Souza at seventeen minutes of Round 1 by armbar.

In June 2013 Gracie participated in a No-gi Superfight at Metamoris 2 in Los Angeles, defeating Japanese MMA star Shinya Aoki by guillotine choke in seven minutes. In October 2013 Gracie won his division of the ADCC World Championship in Beijing submitting all his opponents including Garry Tonon in the Quarter-final, JT Torres in the Semi-final and Otávio Souza submitted by guillotine choke in the Final.

== Mixed martial arts career ==
=== 2014–2016: Japanese debut, Rizin Fighting ===
On February 24, 2014, Gracie announced his intention to pursue an MMA career. Gracie chose to cut down weight to compete at 155 pounds (70 kg) instead of his usual 170–180 pounds (77–82 kg) jiu-jitsu and grappling weight class. He started training for his first MMA bout with the California based Scrap Pack, a group of fighters comprising Cesar Gracie Jiu-Jitsu students Gilbert Melendez, Nick and Nate Diaz. Gracie made his mixed martial arts debut on December 23, 2014, facing fellow South Korean wrestler Hyung Soo-Kim at Real Fighting Championship: Real 1 at a catch weight of 161 pounds (73 kg). Gracie won the fight via armbar, sixty-five seconds into the first round.

Gracie fought on December 31, 2015 at Rizin Fighting Federation World Tournament. He faced Asen Yamamoto and won the fight by submission via triangle choke in the first round. Gracie fought Hideo Tokoro on September 25, 2016. He won via rear-naked choke in the first round.

Gracie faced MMA veteran Tatsuya Kawajiri at the Rizin Fighting Federation Grand Prix: Final Round event on December 31, 2016. He won via rear-naked choke in the second round. This improved his professional MMA record to 4-0.

=== Ultimate Fighting Championship ===
==== 2018–2019 ====
In November 2018, Gracie was signed by the UFC. In his debut fight for the promotion, Gracie faced Alex Caceres on February 17, 2019 at UFC on ESPN 1. He won the fight via submission due to a rear-naked choke in the first round. This fight earned him his first Performance of the Night award.

Gracie faced Cub Swanson on October 12, 2019 at UFC on ESPN+ 19. He lost the fight via unanimous decision. This fight earned him the Fight of the Night bonus award. Many people were confused at Gracie's decision to strike with Swanson instead of taking the fight to the ground where he was predicted to have the advantage. In the years since, several members of the Gracie family have spoken about his loss and criticized his decision to avoid grappling, including his father Rickson and uncle Relson Gracie.

==== 2023 ====
After a four year hiatus, Gracie made his return at UFC 288 on May 6, 2023 against Charles Jourdain. Gracie lost the fight via unanimous decision. Gracie was criticized for his performance by UFC president Dana White, viewers, and fellow fighters, with White saying that Gracie "came in very limited tonight."

==== 2024 ====
Gracie faced Bryce Mitchell on December 7, 2024 at UFC 310. He lost the fight by knockout via ground elbows in the third round, leading to the first loss via stoppage in his MMA career.

On June 6, 2025, it was reported that he was released by the UFC.

=== Post-UFC ===
==== 2025 ====
Kron was scheduled to make his return to MMA against Tom Picciano at Victory Fighting League 3 on December 12, 2025. He was forced to withdraw from the fight after not being medically cleared to compete.

== Personal life ==
When not competing, Gracie taught jiu-jitsu at his school in Culver City, California and helped run his father's association. In January 2021, Gracie announced that he was closing his longtime academy and relocating to Montana to open a new BJJ school in response to the COVID-19 restrictions in place in California. Gracie has stated to various media that he believes in the flat Earth conspiracy theory.

In 2024, Gracie announced the release of his first ever online Jiu-Jitsu instructional. It was entitled Fundamentals of Guard-Passing and was met with positive reviews.

== Instructor lineage ==
Kano Jigoro → Mitsuyo "Count Koma" Maeda → Carlos Gracie → Helio Gracie → Rickson Gracie → Kron Gracie

== Championships and achievements ==
=== Brazilian jiu-jitsu ===
Main Achievements (at black belt level):

- IBJJF European Champion (2009)
- 2nd Place IBJJF World Championship (2011)
- 2nd Place IBJJF Pans Championship (2009)
- 3rd Place IBJJF Pans Championship (2012 (Note: Weight and absolute))

Main Achievements (at colored belts):

- IBJJF World Champion (2006 purple, 2007 brown)
- CBJJO World Jiu-Jitsu Cup Champion (2006 purple)
- Copa Pacifica de Jiu Jitsu Champion (2007)
- IBJJF Pan American Champion (2005 purple, 2007/2008 brown)
- IBJJF American National (2004 blue)
- South Bay Open Jiu-Jitsu Champion (2006)

=== Submission grappling ===
- 2013 ADCC Submission Fighting World Championship – 1st Place – Under 77 kg Division
- 2011 ADCC Submission Wrestling Championships – 3rd Place – Under 77 kg Division
- 2008 Rickson Gracie Cup – 1st Place – Adult Middleweight Division – Brown Belt, 1st Place – Adult Open Division – Brown Belt
- 2006 Naga Championships – 1st Place – Adult Lightweight Division – Purple Belt
- 2006 6th Annual Gracie United Tournament – 1st Place
- 2006 NAGA Chicago Championship – 1st Place

=== Mixed martial arts ===
- Ultimate Fighting Championship
  - Performance of the Night (One time) vs. Alex Caceres
  - Fight of the Night (One time) vs. Cub Swanson
  - UFC.com Awards
    - 2019: Ranked #5 Newcomer of the Year

== Mixed martial arts record ==
Professional record breakdown
8 matches	5 wins	3 losses
By knockout	0	1
By submission	5	0
By decision	0	2

Res.	Record	Opponent	Method	Event	Date	Round	Time	Location	Notes
Loss	5–3	Bryce Mitchell	KO (slam and elbows)	UFC 310	December 7, 2024	3	0:39	Las Vegas, Nevada, United States	
Loss	5–2	Charles Jourdain	Decision (unanimous)	UFC 288	May 6, 2023	3	5:00	Newark, New Jersey, United States	
Loss	5–1	Cub Swanson	Decision (unanimous)	UFC Fight Night: Joanna vs. Waterson	October 12, 2019	3	5:00	Tampa, Florida, United States	Fight of the Night.
Win	5–0	Alex Caceres	Submission (rear-naked choke)	UFC on ESPN: Ngannou vs. Velasquez	February 17, 2019	1	2:06	Phoenix, Arizona, United States	Performance of the Night.
Win	4–0	Tatsuya Kawajiri	Submission (rear-naked choke)	Rizin World Grand Prix 2016: Final Round	December 31, 2016	2	2:04	Saitama, Japan	
Win	3–0	Hideo Tokoro	Submission (rear-naked choke)	Rizin World Grand Prix 2016: 1st Round	September 25, 2016	1	9:45	Saitama, Japan	
Win	2–0	Asen Yamamoto	Submission (triangle choke)	Rizin World Grand Prix 2015: Part 2 - Iza	December 31, 2015	1	4:58	Tokyo, Japan	Featherweight debut.
Win	1–0	Kim Hyung-soo	Submission (armbar)	Real 1	December 23, 2014	1	1:05	Tokyo, Japan	Catchweight (73 kg) bout.

== Grappling record ==
40 Matches, 29 Wins (24 Submissions), 11 Losses (3 Submissions)
Result	Rec.	Opponent	Method	Event	Division	Type	Date	Location	
Win	29-11	(Brazil) Otávio Souza	Submission (guillotine choke)	ADCC World Championship	-77 kg	Nogi	October 20, 2013	(China) Beijing	
Win	28-11	(United States) Jonathan Torres	Submission (armbar)	ADCC World Championship	-77 kg	Nogi	October 20, 2013	(China) Beijing	
Win	27-11	(United States) Garry Tonon	Submission (rear naked choke)	ADCC World Championship	-77 kg	Nogi	October 19, 2013	(China) Beijing	
Win	26-11	(Taiwan) Andy Wang	Technical Submission (rear naked choke)	ADCC World Championship	-77 kg	Nogi	October 19, 2013	(China) Beijing	
Win	25-11	(Japan) Shinya Aoki	Submission (guillotine choke)	Metamoris 2	Superfight	Nogi	June 9, 2013	(United States) Los Angeles, CA	
Win	24-11	(Brazil) Otávio Souza	Submission (armbar)	Metamoris 1	Superfight	Gi	October 14, 2012	(United States) Los Angeles, CA	
Win	23-11	(Brazil) Gabriel Rollo	Points (4-4 ADV)	IBJJF World Championship	-82 kg	Gi	June 3, 2012	(United States) Long Beach, CA	
Win	22-11	(Brazil) Elan Santiago	Submission (choke)	IBJJF World Championship	-82 kg	Gi	June 2, 2012	(United States) Long Beach, CA	
Win	21-11	(Brazil) Victor Estima	Points	World Jiu-Jitsu Expo	Superfight	Gi	May 12, 2012	(United States) Long Beach, CA	
Loss	20-11	(United States) Zak Maxwell	Points (0-4)	ACBJJ World Trials	-77 kg	Gi	September 26, 2012	(United States) San Diego, CA	
Win	20-10	(Assyrian homeland) Beneil Dariush	Referee Decision	ACBJJ World Trials	-77 kg	Gi	September 26, 2012	(United States) San Diego, CA	
Loss	19-10	(Brazil) Victor Estima	Points (2-6)	IBJJF Pan Championship	-82 kg	Gi	April 1, 2012	(United States) Long Beach, CA	
Win	19-9	(Canada) Jake Mackenzie	Submission (choke)	IBJJF Pan Championship	-82 kg	Gi	April 1, 2012	(United States) Long Beach, CA	
Win	18-9	(Brazil) Carlos Ribeiro	Submission (choke)	IBJJF Pan Championship	-82 kg	Gi	March 31, 2012	(United States) Long Beach, CA	
Loss	17-9	(Brazil) Marcus Almeida	Submission (kneebar)	IBJJF Pan Championship	Absolute	Gi	March 31, 2012	(United States) Long Beach, CA	
Win	17-8	(Brazil) Victor Estima	Disqualification	IBJJF Pan Championship	Absolute	Gi	March 31, 2012	(United States) Long Beach, CA	
Win	16-8	(Brazil) Ricardo Evangelista	Submission (footlock)	IBJJF Pan Championship	Absolute	Gi	March 31, 2012	(United States) Long Beach, CA	
Win	15-8	(United States) David Gill	Submission (choke)	IBJJF Pan Championship	Absolute	Gi	March 31, 2012	(United States) Long Beach, CA	
Win	14-8	(Brazil) Claudio Calasans	Submission (guillotine choke)	ADCC World Championship	-77 kg	Nogi	September 25, 2011	(United Kingdom) Nottingham	
Loss	13-8	(Brazil) Marcelo Garcia	Points (0-2)	ADCC World Championship	-77 kg	Nogi	September 25, 2011	(United Kingdom) Nottingham	
Win	13-7	(Brazil) Murilo Santana	Submission (guillotine choke)	ADCC World Championship	-77 kg	Nogi	September 24, 2011	(United Kingdom) Nottingham	
Win	12-7	(United States) Jason Manly	Submission (guillotine choke)	ADCC World Championship	-77 kg	Nogi	September 24, 2011	(United Kingdom) Nottingham	
Loss	11-7	(Brazil) Gilbert Burns	Points (2-9)	IBJJF World Championship	-82 kg	Gi	June 5, 2011	(United States) Long Beach, CA	
Win	11-6	(Brazil) Michael Langhi	Referee decision	IBJJF World Championship	-82 kg	Gi	June 5, 2011	(United States) Long Beach, CA	
Win	10-6	(Brazil) Leandro Lo	Submission (choke)	IBJJF World Championship	-82 kg	Gi	June 5, 2011	(United States) Long Beach, CA	
Win	9-6	(Brazil) Rafael Barbosa	Submission (choke)	IBJJF World Championship	-82 kg	Gi	June 5, 2011	(United States) Long Beach, CA	
Win	8-6	(Brazil) Sergio Rodrigo	Submission (guillotine choke)	IBJJF World Championship	-82 kg	Gi	June 4, 2011	(United States) Long Beach, CA	
Loss	7-6	(Brazil) Sergio Moraes	Points (4-4 ADV)	IBJJF World Championship	-82 kg	Gi	June 5, 2010	(United States) Long Beach, CA	
Loss	7-5	(Brazil) Abmar Barbosa	Points (0-11)	IBJJF Pan Championship	-82 kg	Gi	April 11, 2010	(United States) Long Beach, CA	
Win	7-4	(Brazil) Rodrigo Costa	Submission (armbar)	IBJJF Pan Championship	-82 kg	Gi	April 10, 2010	(United States) Long Beach, CA	
Loss	6-3	(Brazil) Marcelo Garcia	Submission (guillotine choke)	ADCC World Championship	-77 kg	Nogi	September 26, 2009	(Spain) Barcelona	
Win	6-2	(Brazil) Enrico Cocco	Submission (rear naked choke)	ADCC World Championship	-77 kg	Nogi	September 26, 2009	(Spain) Barcelona	
Loss	6-4	(Brazil) Lucas Leite	Points (0-2)	IBJJF World Championship	-82 kg	Gi	June 4, 2009	(United States) Long Beach, CA	
Loss	5-2	(Brazil) Lucas Leite	Points (0-7)	IBJJF Pan Championship	-82 kg	Gi	April 5, 2009	(United States) Long Beach, CA	
Win	5-1	(Brazil) Carlos Ferreira	Submission (footlock)	IBJJF Pan Championship	-82 kg	Gi	April 5, 2009	(United States) Long Beach, CA	
Win	4-1	(Brazil) Abmar Barbosa	Submission (kneebar)	IBJJF Pan Championship	-82 kg	Gi	April 5, 2009	(United States) Long Beach, CA	
Win	3-1	(United States) Nakapan Phungephorn	Submission (armbar)	IBJJF Pan Championship	-82 kg	Gi	April 4, 2009	(United States) Long Beach, CA	
Win	2-1	(Brazil) Pedro Bessa	Submission (guillotine choke)	IBJJF European Open	-82 kg	Gi	January 31, 2009	(Portugal) Lisbon	
Win	1-1	(Brazil) Yan Cabral	Submission (choke)	IBJJF European Open	-82 kg	Gi	January 31, 2009	(Portugal) Lisbon	
Loss	0-1	(Brazil) Sergio Moraes	Submission (bow & arrow choke)	IBJJF World Championship	-82 kg	Gi	May 31, 2008	(United States) Long Beach, CA	Source
