= Monin =

Monin may refer to:

- Monin (company), a French company, producing liqueurs and syrups
- Mønin, a mountain of Buskerud, Norway

== People with the surname ==
- Andrei Monin (1921–2007), Russian physicist, mathematician and oceanographer
- Clarence V. Monin (1941), American trade unionist from Kentucky
- Georges Monin (1893–1944), French entrepreneur, founder of the Monin company
- Gilles du Monin (1565–1624), Belgian historian and liturgical author
- Jean-Michel Monin (born 1967), French cyclist
- Madeleine Molinier née Monin (1898–1976), French scientist and nurse who worked with Marie Curie at the Radium Institute in Paris
- Samuel Monin (1979), Senegalese retired footballer
