= Asian IBJJF Jiu-Jitsu Championship =

Brazilian Jiu-Jitsu competitions

Asian Jiu-Jitsu Championship
Competition details
- Location: Asia
- Discipline: Brazilian Jiu-Jitsu
- Organiser: International Brazilian Jiu-Jitsu Federation

Divisions
- Current weight divisions: (with gi); Ultra Heavyweight: over 221.0 lbs (+100.5 kg); Super Heavyweight: under 221.0 lbs (-100.5 kg); Heavyweight: under 207.5 lbs (-94.3 kg); Medium Heavyweight: under 194.5 lbs (-88.3 kg); Middleweight: under 181.0 lbs (-82.3 kg); Lightweight: under 167.5 lbs (-76 kg); Featherweight: under 154.0 lbs (-70 kg); Light Featherweight: under 141.0 lbs (-64 kg); Roosterweight: under 126.5 lbs (-57 kg)

History
- First edition: 2006
- Editions: 9
- Most wins: Men Koji Shibamato (6); Women Mackenzie Dern (6)

The Asian Championship is the largest Brazilian Jiu-Jitsu tournament held in Asia by the International Brazilian Jiu-Jitsu Federation.

== History ==
The Asian Jiu-Jitsu Championship has been held since 2006 with the first tournament taking place in Tokyo, Japan. In 2008, the championship moved to Bangkok, Thailand, its 2010 third edition was held in Amman, Jordan. The fourth edition was held on the 15th & 16 July 2012 in Doha, Qatar. As of 2013 forwards the championship is hosted annually in Tokyo Japan. For the 2017/2018 season it carried a weighting of 3 in the IBJJF tournament list.

== Asian Champions in Men's Brazilian Jiu Jitsu by Year and Weight ==
Asian Champions in Men's Brazilian jiu-jitsu by Year and Weight
Year	Host	57 kg	64 kg	70 kg	76 kg	82 kg	88 kg	94 kg	100 kg	+100 kg	Absolute
2006	(Japan)	(Japan) Yasuke Honna (1/1)	(Japan) Isamu Shishido (1/2)	(Japan) Takeshi Wantanabe (1/1)	(Brazil) Sugie Daisuke (1/2)	(Brazil) Romulo Barral (1/2)	(Brazil) Leopoldo Canal (1/1)	(Brazil) Arthur Cesar (1/1)		(Brazil) Ulpiano Malachias (1/1)	(Brazil) Romulo Barral (2/2)
2008	(Thailand)		(Japan) Isamu Shisido (2/2)	(Japan) Takumi Nakayama (1/1)	(Japan) Yoshinobu Kakizawa (1/1)	(Japan) Sugie Daisuke (2/2)		(United States) Robert Drysdale (1/1)	(Brazil) Calvacante Junior (1/1)	(Canada) Karim Byron (1/1)	(United States) Mike Fowler (1/1)
2010	(Jordan)	(Japan) Kitade Takuya (1/1)	(Brazil) Pablo Silva (1/1)	(Japan) Ominami Ryo (1/1)	(United States) Jonathan Torres (1/3)	(Brazil) Abmar Barbosa (1/1)	(Brazil) Marcos de Souza (1/2)	(Lebanon) Fadi Serhal (1/1)	(Brazil) Igor Silva (1/1)		(Brazil) Enzo Gracie (2/2)
2012	(Qatar)	(Japan) Koji Shibamoto (1/6)	(Japan) Ichiro Kaneko (1/1)	(Brazil) Isaque Paiva (1/3)	(United States) Jonathan Torres (2/3)	(Brazil) Leandro Souza Kussano (1/1)			(Japan) Akihisa Iriki (1/1)		(United States) Jonathan Torres (3/3)
2013	(Japan)	(Japan) Koji Shibamoto (2/6)	(Japan) Takuto Kako (1/2)	(Japan) Ichitaro Tsukada (1/1)	(Japan) Daisuke Shiraki (1/2)	(Brazil) William Ferreira Dias (1/2)	(Brazil) Vicente Gomes Cavalcanti (1/1)	(Brazil) Charles Gaspar Costa (1/1)	(Brazil) Igor Silva (1/1)		(Brazil) William Ferreira Dias (2/2)
2014	(Japan)	(Japan) Koji Shibamoto (3/6)	(Japan) Takuto Kako (2/2)	(Brazil) Isaque Paiva (2/3)	(Brazil) Roberto Satoshi (1/3)	(Brazil) Rodrigo Caporal (1/2)	(Brazil) Claudio Calasans (1/4)	(United States) Eliot Kelly (1/2)	(Brazil) Marcos de Souza (2/3)	(Dominican Republic) Abraham Marte (1/1)	(Brazil) Claudio Calasans (2/4)
2015	(Japan)	(Japan) Koji Shibamoto (4/6)	(Japan) Kazuhiro Miyachi (1/1)	(Brazil) Isaque Paiva (3/3)	(Brazil) Roberto Satoshi (2/3)	(United States) Andris Brunovskis (1/2)	(Brazil) Marcelo de Toledo (1/1)	(Brazil) Vitor Toledo (1/4)	(Brazil) Marcos de Souza (3/3)	(France) Dany Gerard (1/2)	(France) Dany Gerard (2/2)
2016	(Japan)	(Japan) Tomoyuki Hashimoto (1/1)	(Japan) Yuta Shimada (1/3)	(Philippines) Alvin Aguilar (2/2)	(Brazil) Rodrigo Caporal (2/2)	(Brazil) Roberto Satoshi (3/3)	(Brazil) Claudio Calasans (3/4)	(Brazil) Vitor Toledo (2/4)	(United States) Eliot Kelly (2/2)	(Japan) Hideki Sekine (1/1)	(Brazil) Claudio Calasans (4/4)
2017	(Japan)	(Japan) Koji Shibamoto (5/6)	(Japan) Yuta Shimada (2/3)	(Brazil) Yu Yamaki (1/1)	(United States) Andris Brunovskis (2/2)	(Brazil) Kayron Gracie (1/1)	(Brazil) Lucas Barbosa (1/3)	(United States) Keenan Cornelius (1/3)	(Brazil) Vitor Toledo (3/4)	(Brazil) Igor Silva (1/1)	(United States) Keenan Cornelius (2/3)
2018	(Japan)	(Japan) Koji Shibamoto(6/6)	(Japan) Yuta Shimada(3/3)	(United States) Cole Franson (1/1)	(Brazil) Alexandre Molinaro (1/1)	(Brazil) Luan de Carvalho Alves (1/1)	(Hong Kong) Viking Wong (1/1)	(Brazil) Lucas Barbosa (2/3)	(Brazil) Vitor Toledo (4/4)	(United States) Keenan Cornelius (3/3)	(Brazil) Lucas Barbosa (3/3)
2019	(Japan)	(Japan) Koji Shibamoto	Diego Henrique Sato Aniceto	José Tiago da Silva Barros	Youngseung Cho	Jacob Williams Mackenzie	Thomas Mietz	Werique da Silva Oliveira	(Serbia) Uroš Čulić	Hugo Matheus de Oliveira Alves	(Serbia) Uroš Čulić

== Asian Champions in Women's Brazilian Jiu Jitsu by Year and Weight ==
Asian Champions in Women's Brazilian jiu-jitsu by Year and Weight
Year	Host	-48 kg Rooster	-53 kg Light Feather	-58 kg Feather	-64 kg Light	-69 kg Middle	-74 kg Medium Heavy	-80 kg Heavy	+80 kg Super Heavy	Absolute
2006	(Japan)	(Brazil) Kyra Gracie (1/1)								
2008	(Thailand)			(Japan) Shioda Sakaya (1/1)						(Japan) Abe Takako (1/1)
2014	(Japan)			(United States) Mackenzie Dern (1/6)						(United States) Mackenzie Dern (2/6)
2015	(Japan)			(United States) Mackenzie Dern (3/6)	(Brazil) Isabelle de Souza (1/4)	(United States) Leanna M Dittrich (1/1)				(United States) Mackenzie Dern (4/6)
2016	(Japan)		(United States) Kristina Barlaan (1/3)		(Brazil) Mackenzie Dern (5/6)	(Brazil) Isabelle de Souza (2/4)				(Brazil) Mackenzie Dern (6/6)
2017	(Japan)		(Japan) Saori Shibamoto (1/1)	(United States) Kristina Barlaan (2/3)			(Brazil) Monique Carvalho (1/3)			(Brazil) Monique Carvalho (2/3)
2018	(Japan)		(Brazil) Mayssa Bastos (1/1)	(United States) Kristina Barlaan (3/3)	(United States) Kristin Mikkelson (1/1)	(United States) Erin Herle (1/1)			(Brazil) Claudia do Val (1/2)	(Brazil) Claudia do Val (2/2)
2019	(Japan)		(Japan) Rikako Yuasa	(Brazil) Isabelle de Souza (3/4)		Yuki Kaneko				(Brazil) Isabelle de Souza (4/4)

== See also ==
- IBJJF
- Brazilian Jiu-Jitsu weight classes
- World IBJJF Jiu-Jitsu Championship
- World IBJJF Jiu-Jitsu No-Gi Championship
- European IBJJF Jiu-Jitsu Championship
- European IBJJF Jiu-Jitsu No-Gi Championship
- Pan IBJJF Jiu-Jitsu Championship
- Pan IBJJF Jiu-Jitsu No-Gi Championship
- Brazilian National Jiu-Jitsu Championship
- Brazilian Nationals Jiu-Jitsu No-Gi Championship
