= Michael Fowler (disambiguation) =

Michael Fowler (1929–2022) was a New Zealand politician and architect.

Michael Fowler may also refer to:

- Michael Fowler (judge) (born 1951), British judge
- Mick Fowler (born 1956) British rock climber, ice climber, mountaineer and climbing author
- Mike Fowler (born 1982), American martial artist
- Michael Fowler (footballer) (born 2001), English footballer (Fleetwood Town, Stockton Town), see 2019–20 Fleetwood Town F.C. season

== See also ==
- Micah Fowler (born 1998) American actor
