= Jhenifer Aquino =

Brazilian jiu-jitsu practitioner from Brazil (born 1994)

- Born: 6 September 1994 (age 32); São Paulo, Brazil
- Other names: Jhenifer Aquino Gonzaga
- Division: Rooster −48.5 kg
- Team: Atos Jiu-Jitsu
- Rank: BJJ black belt (Note: Under André Galvão)

Other information
- Occupation: BJJ instructor
- Notable relatives: Thamires Aquino (sister)

Jhenifer Aquino a Brazilian jiu-jitsu black belt practitioner. A World and two-time IBJJF Pan Champion in colored belts, Aquino is a black belt World No-Gi and Pan No-Gi Champion and a 2023 IBJJF World Championship and 2023 Pan Jiu-Jitsu Championship medallist. Aquino is ranked No. 5 in the rooster weight 2022–2023 IBJJF Gi Ranking.

== Early life ==
Jhenifer Aquino was born on 6 September 1994, in São Paulo, Brazil. After practicing capoeira from age 11, she started jiu-jitsu at 15, influenced by her twin sister Thamires who was already training jiu-jitsu under André Ricardo. After receiving her blue belt, she took a break from training to finish veterinary school and only returned to the mats in 2017. After meeting her husband, black belt Matheus Gonzaga, Aquino started practicing more regularly at Bernardo Faria‘s Academy in Massachusetts, USA, where she earned her purple belt.

== Career ==
As a purple Aquino she moved to San Diego, California to join Atos Jiu-Jitsu becoming a full-time athlete and competing extensively. In 2019, she won bronze at the World Championship as a purple belt. After receiving her brown belt, she became World and Pan champion.

=== 2022-2023 - Black belt debut ===
Aquino received her black belt from Atos team leader, multiple world and ADCC champion André Galvão on 28 December 2021. In four months at black belt, Aquino won five gold medals in two championships held in the United States, the IBJJF Los Angeles Open, where she won her category, and the IBJJF Boise Open, where she won her weight class and the absolute in both Gi and No-Gi. In 2022 she became black belt World No-Gi Champion, Pan No-Gi Champion and American National Champion. On June 3 and 4, Aquino competed in the 2023 World Jiu-Jitsu Championship, winning a silver medal at rooster weight.

Aquino is ranked No. 5 in the rooster weight 2022–2023 IBJJF Gi Ranking and No. 6 in the overall No-Gi Ranking.

=== 2024 onwards ===
Aquino won a silver medal in the light-featherweight division of the IBJJF Orange County Open on April 21, 2024.

Aquino won a silver medal in the roosterweight division of the IBJJF World Championship 2024 on June 1, 2024.

== Championships and accomplishments ==
Main Achievements (at black belt):

- IBJJF World No-Gi Champion (2022)
- IBJJF Pan No-Gi Champion (2022)
- 2nd place IBJJF World Championship (2023)
- 2nd place IBJJF Pan Championship (2023)

Main Achievements (at colored Belts):

- IBJJF World Champion (2021 brown)
- IBJJF Pan Champion (2020 purple, 2021 brown)
- IBJJF American Nationals Champion (2021 brown)
- 2nd place IBJJF Pan No-Gi Championship (2020 brown)
- 3rd place IBJJF World Championship (2019 purple)

== Instructor lineage ==
Helio Gracie → Rolls Gracie → Romero "Jacare" Cavalcanti → Alexandre Paiva → Fernando "Tererê" Augusto → André Galvao → Jhenifer Aquino

== Personal life ==
She is the twin sister of Brasileiro champion Thamires Aquino.
