= Peter Letsos =

American martial artist

- Born: Peter Panayotis Letsos; January 1, 1979 (age 47); Chicago, Illinois, United States
- Other names: Pete The Greek, P.T.G.
- Nationality: (United States) American
- Team: Rio Jiu Jitsu
- Rank: Black belt in Brazilian Jiu-Jitsu

Other information
- Website: http://www.riojj.com/

Peter Letsos (born January 1, 1979), aka Pete "The Greek," is a Brazilian Jiu-Jitsu black belt under Carlson Gracie Jr.

== Biography ==
Letsos is a 3-time Pan Am medalist, as well as a 3-time Gracie World Champion.

Letsos began training in Jiu Jitsu in high school at the Carlson Gracie Academy in downtown Chicago, and won several matches in the Jiu Jitsu World Championships as a purple belt. He then lived and train Jiu Jitsu in Brazil for four years, spending many hours on the mat with Osvaldo Alves and Carlson Gracie.

He is featured in the book The Gracie Way by Jiu Jitsu journalist Kid Peligro.

Letsos has trained alongside many of the world's best Jiu Jitsu fighters and mixed martial artists, such as Fredson Paixao, André Galvão, Tony DeSouza, and Miguel Torres. He is friends with Eddie Bravo, Kenny Florian, Jeff Glover, and B.J. Penn. Letsos lived and trained with Penn at his mixed martial arts academy in Hilo, Hawaii, where he eventually suffered a devastating injury to his neck while surfing.

Since then, Letsos' emphasis has been on training students in Brazilian Jiu Jitsu at his gym, Rio Jiu Jitsu Academy, in Chicago's Irving Park neighborhood.

== Instructor lineage ==
Mitsuyo "Count Koma" Maeda → Carlos Gracie, Sr. → Carlson Gracie → Carlson Gracie Jr. → Peter Letsos

== See also ==
- List of Brazilian Jiu-Jitsu practitioners
