= 2011 World Jiu-Jitsu Championship =

Brazilian Jiu-Jitsu competitions

- Venue: The Long Beach Pyramid
- Location: (United States) Long Beach, California
- Dates: 2 June to 5 June 2011
- Website: IBJJF

The 2011 World Jiu-Jitsu Championship, commonly known as the 2011 Mundials or 2011 Worlds, was an international jiu-jitsu event organised by the International Brazilian Jiu-Jitsu Federation (IBJFF) and held at California State University in Long Beach, California, United States, over four days from 2 June to 5 June 2011.

== Teams results ==
Results by Academy

Rank	Men's division	
Rank	Team	Points
1	Alliance	n/a
2	Checkmat	n/a
3	Atos Jiu-Jitsu	n/a

Rank	Women's division	
Rank	Team	Points
1	Alliance	n/a
2	Gracie Humaita	n/a
3	Lloyd Irvin	n/a
