= Torregrosa =

Torregrosa is a surname of Spanish origin.

== List of people with the surname ==
- Joaquín Chapaprieta y Torregrosa (1871–1951), Spanish politician
- José Luis Torregrosa (1944–2007), Spanish singer
- Luisita Lopez Torregrosa (born 1943), Puerto Rican journalist
- Manuel Lillo Torregrosa (born 1940), Spanish composer
- Marcos Torregrosa, Brazilian martial artist
- María Isabel Sánchez Torregrosa (born 1979), Spanish politician

== See also ==
- Torregrossa, Spain
- Torre Grossa, Italy
