= Viking Wong =

Hong Kong Brazilian jiu-jitsu practitioner and fashion designer

- Born: Wong Wai Chun; 17 January 1987 (age 39); British Hong Kong
- Height: 5 ft 9 in (1.75 m)
- Weight: 88 kg (194 lb; 13 st 12 lb)
- Division: Medium Heavy
- Team: Inglorious Grapplers
- Rank: 2nd deg. BJJ black belt (Note: under Jude Samuel)

Other information
- University: London College of Fashion
- Notable schools: Diocesan Boys' School; Australian International School Hong Kong

Chinese Name
- Traditional Chinese: 黃維俊
Transcriptions
Yue: Cantonese
- Jyutping: wong4 wai4 zeon3

Viking Wai Chun Wong (Chinese: 黃維俊; Jyutping: wong4 wai4 zeon3; born 17 January 1987) is a Hong Kong born fashion designer and Brazilian jiu-jitsu (BJJ) black belt practitioner.

Wong is the first Chinese male to qualify and compete at the World IBJJF Jiu-Jitsu Championship at adult black belt level, Wong is the first Chinese black belt Asian IBJJF Jiu-Jitsu male Champion.

== Background ==
Viking Wong was born on 17 January 1987 in British Hong Kong. Wong's grandmother was a tailor and his family is in the garment manufacturing business.

Growing up, Wong was a competitive swimmer. Wong attended university at the London College of Fashion graduating in 2009 with a First Class Honors degree in womenswear. In the same year, Wong started training BJJ.

After graduating, Wong worked for design houses in the United Kingdom such as Vivenne Westwood, Victoria Beckham and Burberry before starting his own brand. Eventually Wong quit his full-time job in fashion to spend more time training and teaching BJJ. In 2016, after getting promoted to black belt, he returned to Hong Kong to provide develop the BJJ scene there.

== Brazilian Jiu-Jitsu competitive summary ==
Main Achievements (Black Belt)

- ADCC Asian Open Champion (2017)
- IBJJF Asian Champion (2018)
- 2nd place IBJJF Asian Championship (2019)
- 2nd place ADCC Asian Trials (2017)
- 3rd place IBJJF Asian Championship (2017)
- 3rd place IBJJF European Championship (2018)

Main Achievements (Coloured Belts)

- 3rd place IBJJF Asian Championship (2015 brown)
- 3rd place IBJJF European Championship (2014 brown)
- 3rd place IBJJF European No-Gi Championship (2014 brown)

== Instructor lineage ==
Kano Jigoro → Tomita Tsunejiro → Mitsuyo "Count Koma" Maeda → Carlos Gracie, Sr. → Helio Gracie → Rolls Gracie → Mauricio Motta Gomes → Jude Samuel → Viking Wong

== Fashion career ==
In 2008 Wong's work was featured in the Victoria & Albert Museum’s Young British Designers: Mapping Future Fashion exhibition.

In 2010, Wong's work was featured in both London Fashion Week and Paris Fashion Week.

In 2011, Wong was selected by Vogue as one of the top twelve Designers to Watch.

In 2014, Wong worked with Shoyoroll to create the Absolute cut version of the Brazilian jiu-jitsu gi.

== Personal life ==
In 2016, Wong formed the Hong Kong-China Brazilian Jiu-Jitsu Association. In addition, Wong has founded Jiu-Jitsu Sans Frontiere, a network of gyms across Asia.

Wong has spent time providing grappling training to the Hong Kong Police Force as well as the Philippine National Police and People's Armed Police.

Wong currently resides in Italy with his family.
