= Leo Dalla =

BJJ practitioner

- Born: Leonardo Dalla; 1974 (age 51–52); Rio de Janeiro, Brazil
- Nationality: (Brazil) Brazilian
- Style: Brazilian Jiu-Jitsu
- Team: Big Brothers
- Rank: coral belt in Brazilian Jiu-Jitsu under Jorge Pereira

Other information
- Notable students: Lloyd Irvin
- Website: leodalla.com

Leonardo Dalla (born 1974) is a Brazilian Jiu-Jitsu black belt competitor and instructor. He was medalist in several major Brazilian Jiu-Jitsu competitions, such as the World Championship, Pan American Championship gi and no-gi, and Brazilian National Championship.

Leo Dalla was born in 1974, growing up in Rio de Janeiro – Brazil. Dalla started training in 1987 at age of 13, in Rio de Janeiro, Brazil becoming the very first student to receive a Black Belt under Master Jorge Pereira in June 1993.

== Instructor lineage ==
Mitsuyo "Count Koma" Maeda → Carlos Gracie → Helio Gracie → Rickson Gracie → Jorge Pereira → Leonardo Dalla
