= Jonathan Torres (grappler) =

Brazilian jiu-jitsu practitioner

- Born: September 2, 1989 (age 36); Bronx, New York, U.S.
- Other names: JT; Spiderman
- Division: Lightweight
- Style: Brazilian Jiu Jitsu
- Team: Atos Jiu-Jitsu
- Rank: 4th degree black belt in Brazilian Jiu Jitsu

Other information
- Occupation: BJJ practitioner, instructor

Jonathan Torres
Medal record

Representing United States

Grappling

ADCC Submission Wrestling World Championship
Gold medal – first place	2019 Anaheim, California	-77kg
Gold medal – first place	2017 Espoo, Finland	-77kg

Brazilian Jiu-Jitsu/Grappling

World No-Gi Championship
Gold medal – first place	2013	Lightweight (Black)
Silver medal – second place	2012	Lightweight (Black)
Bronze medal – third place	2010	Lightweight (Black)
Silver medal – second place	2009	Lightweight (Black)
Gold medal – first place	2008	Lightweight (Brown)

Pan No-Gi Championship
Gold medal – first place	2010	Lightweight (Black)
Silver medal – second place	2009	Lightweight (Black)
Gold medal – first place	2008	Lightweight (Brown)

World Jiu-Jitsu Championship
Bronze medal – third place	2015	Lightweight (Black)
Silver medal – second place	2014	Lightweight (Black)
Bronze medal – third place	2011	Lightweight (Black)
Silver medal – second place	2009	Lightweight (Brown)

Pan-American Championship
Bronze medal – third place	2014	Lightweight (Black)
Bronze medal – third place	2013	Lightweight (Black)
Bronze medal – third place	2011	Lightweight (Black)
Bronze medal – third place	2009	Lightweight (Brown)
Silver medal – second place	2007	Featherweight (Purple)
Silver medal – second place	2006	Lightweight (Blue Juvenile)

European Open Championships
Silver medal – second place	2014	Middleweight (Black)
Silver medal – second place	2012	Lightweight (Black)
Bronze medal – third place	2011	Lightweight (Black)
Bronze medal – third place	2010	Lightweight (Black)
Gold medal – first place	2009	Lightweight (Brown)

Brazilian National Jiu-Jitsu Championship
Silver medal – second place	2010	Lightweight (Black)

Asian Open Championship
Gold medal – first place	2012	Lightweight (Black)
Gold medal – first place	2012	Absolute (Black)
Gold medal – first place	2010	Lightweight (Black)
Bronze medal – third place	2010	Absolute (Black)

New York International Open Championship
Gold medal – first place	2010	Lightweight (Black)
Gold medal – first place	2009	Lightweight (Brown)

Miami International Open Championship
Gold medal – first place	2010	Lightweight (Black)
Silver medal – second place	2009	Lightweight (Black)

Jonathan Torres, also known as "JT" Torres, is an American Brazilian Jiu-Jitsu practitioner and submission grappler. He is known for a number of competitive accomplishments earned both prior to and following his promotion to black belt.

Though having won numerous victories in gi competition, Torres has been particularly successful in no-gi events, earning multiple international championships.

== Early life and background ==
Jonathan Torres was born on September 2, 1989, in New York, United States, of Puerto Rican descent. In March 2013, Torres left Team Lloyd Irvin and joined Atos Jiu-Jitsu. He began his martial arts journey at a young age with karate, achieving a black belt before high school. Feeling unfulfilled by karate, Torres transitioned to Brazilian Jiu-Jitsu as a teenager after discovering a small BJJ program at his former karate school. Demonstrating natural talent, he earned his blue belt in just six months under his first instructor before moving to train with Louis Vintaloro at Performance BJJ in New Jersey. Under Vintaloro, Torres progressed rapidly, receiving his purple and brown belts in less than three years and winning the IBJJF Pan American Championship twice as a lower belt. Seeking a more competitive environment, Torres joined Team Lloyd Irvin in Maryland in 2009, where he was awarded his BJJ black belt later that year by Lloyd Irvin.

== Grappling career ==
In March 2013, Torres left Team Lloyd Irvin and joined Atos Jiu-Jitsu.

On November 22, 2014, Torres fought Rory MacDonald in a grappling match in Metamoris V. The fight ended in a draw.

Torres competed in the under 77kg division of the 2022 ADCC World Championship, beating Kenta Iwamoto in the opening round and losing to PJ Barch in the quarter-final.

=== Team transitions ===
When Torres left Team Lloyd Irvin amid controversies surrounding the team and joined Atos Jiu-Jitsu in San Diego, California, under the guidance of André Galvão, it marked a significant turning point in his career, aligning him with one of the most successful teams in modern BJJ. Training alongside elite grapplers like Keenan Cornelius, Torres refined his skills and elevated his performance on the international stage.

=== Early black belt career ===
As a black belt, Torres quickly made an impact. In 2011, he won the ADCC North American Trials, qualifying for his first ADCC World Championship in Nottingham, England, where he reached the quarter-finals. In 2013, he secured a bronze medal at the ADCC World Championship in Beijing, China. That same year, he claimed his first IBJJF No-Gi World Championship title, defeating Marcelo Mafra in the final. On November 22, 2014, Torres faced former UFC welterweight champion Rory MacDonald in a grappling superfight at Metamoris V. The match ended in a draw.

=== ADCC success ===
Torres achieved the pinnacle of no-gi grappling by winning the ADCC World Championship in the under 77kg division in 2017 and 2019. In 2017, held in Espoo, Finland, he defeated five-time IBJJF World Champion Lucas Lepri in a 30-minute final, becoming the first American to win the 77kg division in ADCC history. He repeated as champion in 2019 in Anaheim, California, solidifying his status as one of the world’s elite grapplers.

=== 2022 ADCC World Championship ===
Torres competed in the under 77kg division at the 2022 ADCC World Championship in Las Vegas, Nevada. He defeated Kenta Iwamoto in the opening round but lost to PJ Barch of 10th Planet Jiu-Jitsu in the quarter-finals, ending his bid for a third consecutive title.

=== 2023 ===
Torres was booked to compete against Magid Hage at Who's Number One on February 25, 2023. He won the match by unanimous decision. He then entered the IBJJF Chicago Open on April 29 and 30, 2023 where he won a gold medal in the middleweight gi division. Torres competed at the IBJJF New York Open 2023 on August 5 and won gold in the Master 1 middleweight division.

Torres competed at the IBJJF Master World Championship on September 2, 2023, where he won a silver medal in the master 1 lightweight division.

=== 2024 ===
Torres competed in the IBJJF New York Spring Open 2024 on April 7, winning a silver medal in the gi middleweight division.

Torres faced Nicky Ryan in a welterweight superfight at Who's Number One 23 on May 10, 2024. He lost the match by submission.

Torres received an invite to compete in the under 77kg division of the 2024 ADCC World Championship on August 17-18, 2024. He submitted Alexandre de Jesus in the opening round and lost to Elijah Dorsey on points in the quarter-final.

== Coaching and legacy ==
In 2016, Torres opened Essential Jiu-Jitsu, an Atos-affiliated academy in White Plains, New York, where he serves as head instructor. Balancing his competitive career with teaching, he has mentored a new generation of grapplers while maintaining a reputation as one of the East Coast’s premier BJJ coaches. His academy is highly regarded for its technical instruction and competitive training environment. Torres has also contributed to the sport through instructional content, releasing DVDs and online tutorials focusing on guard passing, back control, and submission techniques, further cementing his influence in the BJJ community.

== Personal life ==
Torres resides in New York and is known for his disciplined lifestyle, often citing his mantra, "Hard work works!" as the key to his success. Outside of grappling, he enjoys a low-key life, preferring simple pleasures like watching movies and eating Philly cheesesteaks over nightlife.

== Competitive achievements ==
- ADCC World Championship: Gold (2017, 2019), Bronze (2013)
- IBJJF No-Gi World Championship: Gold (2013)
- IBJJF Pan American Championship: Gold (2015, multiple lower belt titles)
- IBJJF European Championship: Gold (2015)
- IBJJJF Chicago Open: Gold (2023, middleweight gi)
- IBJJF New York Open: Gold (2023, Master 1 middleweight)
- IBJJF Master World Championship: Silver (2023, Master 1 lightweight)
- IBJJF New York Spring Open: Silver (2024, middleweight gi)

== See also ==
- André Galvão
- Braulio Estima
- Gabi Pessanha
- Cyborg Abreu
