= Marcos Torregrosa =

Brazilian martial artist

Marcos "Yemaso" Torregrosa
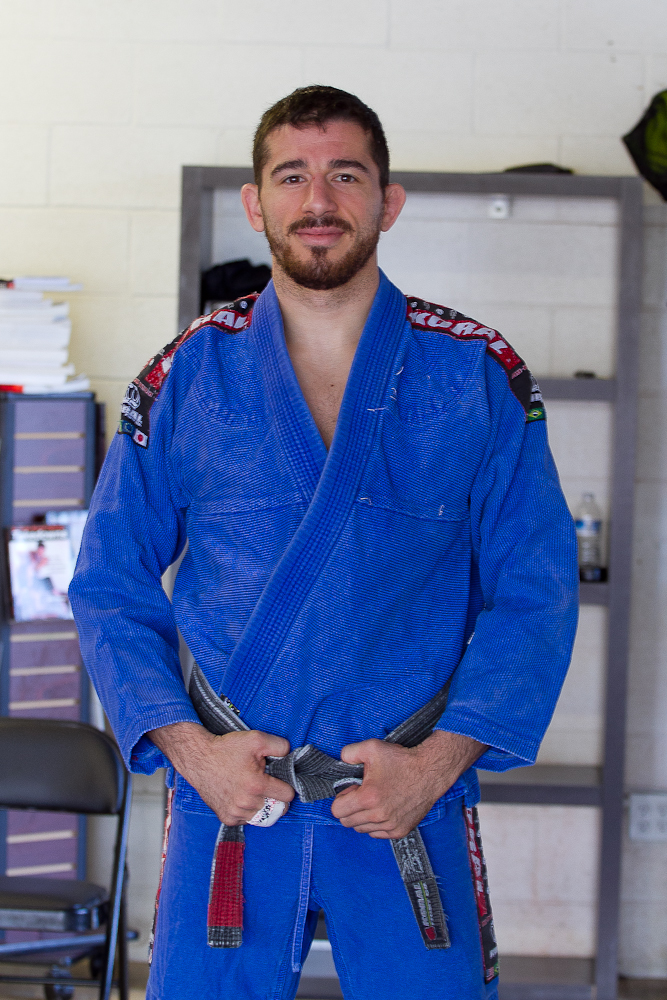
- Height: 5 ft 10 in (1.78 m)
- Weight: 167 lb (76 kg; 11.9 st)
- Style: Brazilian Jiu-Jitsu
- Rank: 3rd Degree Black Belt in BJJ

Other information
- Notable club(s): Yemaso Brazilian Jiu-Jitsu
- Notable school(s): Yemaso Brazilian Jiu-Jitsu

Marcos Alejandro Torregrosa is a Brazilian Jiu-Jitsu practitioner.

== Biography ==
He had his first experience with Brazilian Jiu-Jitsu and MMA in Bayamon, Puerto Rico where UFC 8 took place. Torregrosa began training in July 1999. Torregrosa was awarded a black belt in January 2007.

In 2008 Torregrosa became the head instructor at Capital City Brazilian Jiu-Jitsu. While teaching at Capital City Brazilian Jiu-Jitsu, Torregrosa developed Yemaso Jiu-Jitsu. Torregrosa founded Team Yemaso in 2009, which consisted of a small team of his best students.

In May 2011 Torregrosa became a member of Team Lloyd Irvin, and in August 2011 decided to open his own Brazilian Jiu-Jitsu school in the Sacramento area. As of 2013 Torregrosa no longer affiliates himself with any team other than Yemaso Brazilian Jiu-Jitsu and in February, Torregrosa and Team Yemaso made history and became the first team in the greater Sacramento, CA area to win an International Brazilian Jiu-Jitsu Federation (IBJJF) Team Title.

In September 2013 Torregrosa received his Second Degree Black Belt in Brazilian Jiu-Jitsu from the IBJJF and finished the 2013 year as the number one ranked black belt in both his division (Leve/Light Weight) and Absolute (all weight divisions) with the kimono. He also held the number one ranking without the kimono (no gi) in his division (Leve/Light Weight) and is ranked 9th overall Absolute no gi completing his most productive year to date as a black belt.

In February 2014 Torregrosa lead his team to a second place team title for the second consecutive year at an IBJJF event.

In February 2015 Team Yemaso competed and brought back to Sacramento, CA their third team title (3rd place) at an IBJJF event.

In October 2016 Torregrosa received his Third Degree Black Belt Brazilian Jiu-Jitsu from the IBJJF.

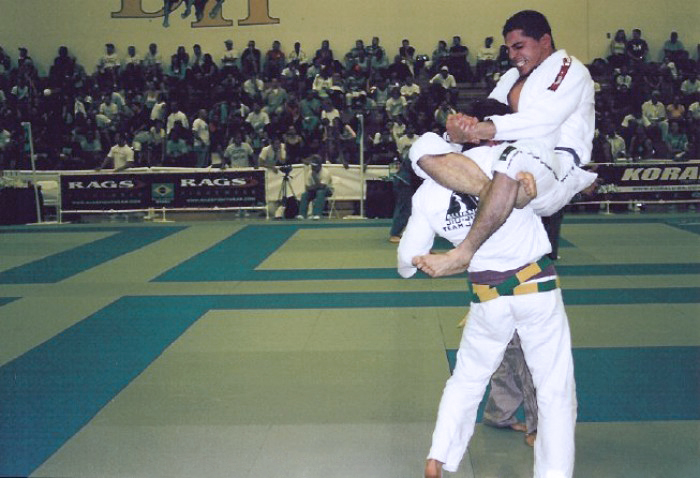
Brazilian Jiu-Jitsu Black Belt Marcos Torregrosa landing a flying triangle choke in competition

== Championships ==
- 2017 IBJJF No Gi WORLD Champion - Light Weight Black Belt Master 2
- 2017 Fight to Win Pro 57 Super Fight Champion
- 2017 IBJJF Masters WORLD Champion - Light Weight Black Belt Master 2
- 2017 IBJJF Seattle Open Champion - Middle Weight Black Belt Master 2
- 2017 IBJJF San Jose Open Champion - Middle Weight Black Belt Master 2
- 2017 IBJJF American National Champion - Light Weight Black Belt Master 2
- 2017 IBJJF American National No Gi Champion - Light Weight Black Belt Master 2
- 2017 Fight to Win Pro 38 Super Fight Champion
- 2017 IBJJF New York Spring Open Champion - Light Weight Black Belt Master 2
- 2017 IBJJF New York Spring Open No Gi Champion - Middle Weight Master 2
- 2017 IBJJF Pan American Champion - Light Weight Black Belt Master 2
- 2017 Fight to Win Pro 23 Super Fight Champion
- 2017 IBJJF San Jose Open No Gi Champion - Middle Weight Black Belt Master 2
- 2016 IBJJF Long Beach Open Champion - Medium Heavy Weight Black Belt Master 1
- 2016 Fulton Brewery Jiu-Jitsu Super Fight Champion
- 2016 Fight to Win Pro 8 Super Fight Champion
- 2016 IBJJF American National No Gi Champion - Light Weight Black Belt Master 1
- 2016 IBJJF American National Gi Champion - Light Weight Black Belt Master 1
- 2016 IBJJF Pan American Champion - Light Weight Black Belt Master 1
- 2016 UAEJJF/USPROJJ Trails Absolute Champion - Black Belt Master 1
- 2016 UAEJJF/USPROJJ Trails Champion - Light Weight Black Belt Master 1
- 2016 IBJJF San Jose Open Absolute Champion - Black Belt Master 2
- 2016 IBJJF San Jose Open Champion - Middle Weight Black Belt Master 2
- 2016 IBJJF San Jose Open No Gi Champion - Middle Weight Black Belt Master 2
- 2015 IBJJF American National Gi Champion - Light Weight Black Belt Master
- 2015 IBJJF American National No Gi Champion - Light Weight Black Belt Master
- 2015 IBJJF/CBJJ Brazilian National Champion - Light Weight Black Belt Master
- 2015 IBJJF New York Spring Open No Gi Absolute Champion - Black Belt Master
- 2015 IBJJF New York Spring Open No Gi Champion - Light Weight Black Belt Master
- 2015 IBJJF New York Spring Open Champion - Light Weight Black Belt Master
- 2015 IBJJF Chicago Spring Open No Gi Absolute Champion - Black Belt Master
- 2015 IBJJF Chicago Spring Open No Gi Champion - Middle Weight Black Belt Master
- 2015 IBJJF Chicago Spring Open Champion - Middle Weight Black Belt Master
- 2015 IBJJF San Francisco Open Absolute Champion - Black Belt Master
- 2015 IBJJF San Francisco Open Champion - Medium Heavy Weight Black Belt Master
- 2014 IBJJF Long Beach Open Champion - Light Weight Black Belt Master
- 2014 IBJJF Miami Open Absolute Champion - Black Belt Master
- 2014 IBJJF Miami Open Champion - Light Weight Black Belt Master
- 2014 IBJJF No Gi WORLD Champion - Light Weight Black Belt Master
- 2014 IBJJF American National No Gi Champion - Light Weight Black Belt Master
- 2014 IBJJF American National Gi Champion - Light Weight Black Belt Master
- 2014 IBJJF Las Vegas Open Champion - Light Weight Black Belt Master
- 2014 IBJJF Pan American Champion - Light Weight Black Belt Master
- 2014 IBJJF San Francisco Open Absolute Champion - Black Belt Master
- 2014 IBJJF San Francisco Open Champion - Light Weight Black Belt Master
- 2013 IBJJF Fall Open Absolute Champion - Black Belt Master
- 2013 IBJJF Fall Open Champion - Light Weight Black Belt Master
- 2013 IBJJF Masters WORLD Champion - Light Weight Black Belt Master
- 2013 IBJJF American National No Gi Champion - Light Weight Black Belt Master
- 2013 IBJJF American National Gi Champion - Light Weight Black Belt Master
- 2013 IBJJF Chicago Summer Open No Gi Champion - Light Weight Black Belt Master
- 2013 IBJJF Chicago Summer Open Champion - Light Weight Black Belt Master
- 2013 IBJJF Las Vegas Summer Open Champion - Light Weight Black Belt Master
- 2013 IBJJF New York Open Champion - Light Weight Black Belt Master
- 2013 IBJJF Pan American Champion - Light Weight Black Belt Master
- 2013 IBJJF Chicago Open No Gi Champion - Light Weight Black Belt Master
- 2013 IBJJF Chicago Open Champion - Light Weight Black Belt Master
- 2013 IBJJF San Francisco Open Absolute Champion - Black Belt Master
- 2013 IBJJF San Francisco Open Champion - Light Weight Black Belt Master
- 2012 IBJJF No Gi WORLD Champion - Light Weight Black Belt Master
- 2012 IBJJF Master/ Senior WORLD Championship - 2nd place Light Weight Black Belt
- 2012 IBJJF American National No Gi Champion - Light Weight Black Belt Master
- 2012 IBJJF American National Gi Champion - Light Weight Black Belt Master
- 2012 IBJJF Las Vegas Open Champion - Light Weight Black Belt Master
- 2012 IBJJF Spring Open Absolute Champion - Black Belt Master
- 2012 IBJJF Spring Open Champion - Light Weight Black Belt Master
- 2012 IBJJF San Francisco Open - 2nd Place Middle Weight Black Belt
- 2011 US Open Champion - Light Weight Black Belt
- 2011 IBJJF/CBJJ Masters/ Seniors Champion - Light Weight Black Belt
- 2011 American Cup Champion - Light Weight Black Belt
- 2010 Grapplers Quest Champion - Advanced No Gi
- 2010 American Cup Champion - Black Belt Light Weight
- 2010 Abu Dhabi Pro West Coast Trials Light Weight Champion
- 2009 Grapplers Quest Champion - Advanced No Gi
- 2007 IBJJF American Nationals Champion - Black Belt Light Weight
- 2007 Arizona State BJJ Championship Black Belt Super Fight Champion
- 2006 Grapplers Quest - Advance No Gi Champion
- 2006 US Open Champion - Brown Belt Light Weight
- 2006 9th Arizona Grappling Challenge No Gi Pro Division Champion
- 2006 East Coast Championship (Gi Division) Champion - Brown Belt Middle Weight
- 2006 United Gracie Champion of Champions ( Absolute) - Brown Belt
- 2006 United Gracie Champion - Brown Belt Light Weight
- 2004 Half Moon bay Champion - Purple Belt Middle Weight
- 2004 IBJJF American Nationals - Absolute Champion - Purple Belt
- 2004 Mundial Semi-Finalist - Purple Belt Middle Weight
- 2004 IBJJF Pan American Champion - Purple Belt Middle Weight
- 2003 US Open Absolute Champion - Purple Belt
- 2002 Copa do Brasil Semi-Finalist - Purple Belt Middle Weight
- 2002 Copa do Mundo Champion - Blue Belt Middle Weight
- 2002 Copa Pacifica Champion - Blue Belt Middle Weight
- 2001 United Gracie Champion - Blue Belt Middle Weight
- 2000 2nd American International Championship of Brazilian Jiu-Jitsu Champion - Blue Belt Middle Weight
