= Atos Jiu-Jitsu =

Brazilian jiu-jitsu academy and competition team based in California

- Date founded: 2008
- Country of origin: US; Brazil (until 2010)
- Founder: Ramon Lemos, Andre Galvão (until 2026)
- Arts taught: Brazilian jiu-jitsu, Grappling
- Practitioners: see Notable members
- Official website: www.atosjiujitsuhq.com

Atos Jiu-Jitsu
Medal record

Representing United States

Brazilian Jiu-Jitsu

IBJJF World Jiu-Jitsu Championships (Gi)
Gold medal – first place	2018 Long Beach, California	Adult Male Team
Gold medal – first place	2017 Long Beach, California	Adult Male Team
Gold medal – first place	2014 Long Beach, California	Adult Male Team
Gold medal – first place	2013 Long Beach, California	Adult Male Team
Gold medal – first place	2012 Long Beach, California	Adult Male Team
Silver medal – second place	2023 Long Beach, California	Adult Male Team
Bronze medal – third place	2021 Anaheim, California	Adult Male Team

Pan IBJJF Jiu-Jitsu Championship
Gold medal – first place	2020 Kissimmee, Florida	Adult Team
Gold medal – first place	2016 Irvine, California	Adult Team
Silver medal – second place	2024 Kissimmee, Florida	Adult Team
Bronze medal – third place	2022 Kissimmee, Florida	Adult Team

Grappling

IBJJF World No-Gi Championships
Gold medal – first place	2019 Anaheim, California	Overall Team
Gold medal – first place	2015 Long Beach, California	Overall Team
Silver medal – second place	2024 Las Vegas, Nevada	Adult Male Team
Bronze medal – third place	2022 Anaheim, California	Adult Male Team

Brazilian Jiu-Jitsu

IBJJF Kids and Juvenile Divisions
Gold medal – first place	2023 Long Beach, California	Kids World Team
Gold medal – first place	2022 Long Beach, California	Kids World Team
Gold medal – first place	2021 Anaheim, California	Kids Pans Team
Gold medal – first place	2020 Kissimmee, Florida	Kids Pans Team
Silver medal – second place	2024 Long Beach, California	Kids World Team
Bronze medal – third place	2023 Kissimmee, Florida	Kids Pans Team

Atos Jiu-Jitsu is a Brazilian jiu-jitsu academy and competition team started in 2008 by Ramon Lemos and Andre Galvão and headquartered in San Diego, California since 2010.

== History ==
In October 2008, after the decline of Brasa Academy, the Brazilian jiu-jitsu team to which they both belonged, Ramon Lemos and André Galvão decided to form a competition team with a strong moral foundation based on their Christian faith. The word "Atos" is the Portuguese word for "acts" and is a reference the New Testament Acts of the Apostles. Atos Jiu-Jitsu was established in Rio Claro, São Paulo, Brazil before moving to California in 2010. The team led by multi-time world champion Galvão, quickly grew into one of the strongest teams in Jiu-Jitsu & submission grappling, winning quickly after its establishment 5 black belt World Jiu-Jitsu Championships and producing multiple champion athletes over the years.

Atos came in 5th place in the IBJJF Top 10 Academy Rankings for the 2021/2022 season. Atos Jiu-jitsu schools are present in over 20 countries worldwide.

Atos won Team of the Year at the Jits Magazine BJJ Awards 2024.

=== Sexual assault allegations ===
In 2026 there was a mass exodus from Atos after Galvao received allegations of sexual misconduct. Lucas Pinheiro cut ties with Galvao. Bruno Frazzatto, an original Atos core member, cut ties and renamed his gym. Two-time ADCC champion JT Torres ended his gym’s affiliation with Atos. On February 4 2026, Atos announced the immediate and indefinite release of Galvao and his wife from their positions within the organization. Atos updated its website to state: "Atos was founded in 2008 by Prof. Ramon Lemos and his partners".

== Academy and Training ==
The Atos headquarters in San Diego, California, is recognized as one of the premier Brazilian Jiu-Jitsu training facilities in the world. Under the leadership of André Galvão, the academy offers a variety of programs, including Gi and No-Gi classes, women’s-only classes, kids’ programs starting at age three, and competition training. The academy is known for its structured curriculum, which emphasizes both foundational techniques and innovative strategies that have contributed to its competitive success. Atos has also developed an online platform, Atos BJJ On Demand, providing access to over 12,000 hours of instructional content from Galvão and other world-class instructors.

The team is credited with advancing modern Jiu-Jitsu through the development and popularization of techniques such as the 50/50 guard, the berimbolo, and the leg drag guard pass, particularly during its early years with lightweight competitors like the Mendes brothers.

== Worldwide Affiliates ==
Since its founding, Atos Jiu-Jitsu has expanded globally, establishing affiliates in over 20 countries, including the United States, Brazil, Australia, Japan, the Philippines, France, and Guam, among others. Notable affiliates include Atos Paris in France, led by black belt instructors affiliated with the Mendes brothers, and Atos Philippines, which has multiple branches such as Bohol Island Jiu-Jitsu and Forge Jiu-Jitsu in Cagayan de Oro. The expansion reflects the team’s motto, “Together We Are Stronger,” emphasizing a tight-knit community despite its global reach.

== Team Championships ==
Atos Jiu-Jitsu has established itself as a dominant force in team competitions, consistently achieving top placements in major Brazilian Jiu-Jitsu tournaments. Below are some of the team’s most notable championship victories:

- IBJJF World Jiu-Jitsu Championships (Gi): Atos won the adult male team title in 2012, 2013, 2014, 2017, and 2018, showcasing its dominance across multiple weight classes.
- IBJJF World No-Gi Championships: The team secured the overall team title in 2015 and 2019, demonstrating its versatility in submission grappling.
- IBJJF Pan-American Championships: Atos has claimed the team title multiple times, including in 2016 and 2020, reinforcing its reputation as a powerhouse in the sport.
- Kids and Juvenile Divisions: The Atos kids’ program has produced numerous champions, winning team titles at the IBJJF Kids Pans and Worlds events, establishing a strong foundation for the next generation of competitors.

In addition to these victories, Atos has consistently placed in the top ranks of IBJJF events, such as its 5th-place finish in the 2021/2022 season rankings, and continues to be a leading team in both Gi and No-Gi competitions.

== Notable members ==
The first black belts to be promoted by Atos were brothers Rafael & Guilherme Mendes in 2008.

Atos current and former members include:

=== BJJ ===
- Lucas Barbosa
- Claudio Calasans
- Keenan Cornelius
- Ffion Davies
- Kaynan Duarte
- Mike Fowler
- Josh Hinger
- Guilherme Mendes
- Rafael Mendes
- Luiza Monteiro
- Kade Ruotolo
- Tye Ruotolo
- Jonathan Torres
- Maggie Grindatti
- Andy Murasaki
- Ronaldo Junior
- Adele Fornarino

=== MMA ===
- Cris Cyborg
- Israel Adesanya
- Gilbert Burns
- Carlos Diego Ferreira
- Davi Ramos
- Anderson Silva
- Cat Zingano

== See also ==
- Brazilian jiu-jitsu
- Grappling
