= Jeff Glover =

Jiu-Jitsu practitioner

- Born: April 15, 1983 (age 43); East Los Angeles, California, U.S.
- Other names: The Pipelayer
- Weight: 145 lb (66 kg; 10.4 st)
- Division: Featherweight; Lightweight
- Fighting out of: Goleta, California
- Team: Goodland Jiu Jitsu
- Teacher: Ricardo Miller
- Rank: 4th degree Black belt in Brazilian Jiu-Jitsu

Other information
- Mixed martial arts record from Sherdog

Jeff Glover
Medal record

Brazilian Jiu-Jitsu/Grappling

ADCC World Championship
Bronze medal – third place	2011	-66kg

World No-Gi Championship
Silver medal – second place	2008	Featherweight (black)
Gold medal – first place	2007	Featherweight (black)

Pan-American Championship
Gold medal – first place	2006	Featherweight (brown)
Gold medal – first place	2005	Featherweight (brown)

Jeff Glover (born April 15, 1983) is an American submission wrestler and Brazilian Jiu-Jitsu black belt. He is known for his competitive achievements in both gi and no-gi competition.

== Career ==
Glover has competed in numerous exhibition matches, including at the inaugural World Jiu-Jitsu Expo where he scored a win over 7-time World black belt champion Caio Terra. Glover also holds a notable submission win over 6-time black belt World champion Robson Moura at the 2011 ADCC Submission Wrestling World Championship.

Glover is known for his particularly playful and unorthodox style of grappling. After their super-fight in 2012, Chris Haueter said of Glover's grappling style – “It’s like grappling a monkey or a cat. He never loses balance.”

In 2014, Glover was a color commentator for Metamoris III and IV. At Metamoris IV he and Baret Yoshida were surprise competitors in the much-hyped "secret match", that ended in a draw.

=== Competition return ===
After spending 7 years retired from competition, Glover returned to face Urijah Faber in a Combat Jiu-Jitsu match at A1 Combat 21 on May 25, 2024. He was submitted via a rear naked choke.

== Grapplers Quest record ==
As of 2012, Glover, a 27-time Grapplers Quest champion, held the best record in the event's history, having lost only 4 times over 8 years of active competition.
