= Mønin =

Mountain in Norway

Coordinates: 60°52′21″N 7°51′40″E

Highest point
- Elevation: 1,723.6 m (5,655 ft)

Geography
- Location: Buskerud, Norway

Mønin is a mountain in Ål municipality in Buskerud, Norway. It rises to 1,721 metres above sea level.
