= Metamoris =

Submission grappling promotion

Metamoris is a defunct submission grappling and Brazilian jiu-jitsu promotion, founded by Ralek Gracie, and executive producer Eddie Marquez that organized events in Los Angeles, California. Live events of Metamoris were broadcast via internet pay-per-view around the world and via premium TV at Canal Combate in Brazil.

Regarded as a pioneer in professional submission grappling, the promotion had a series of difficulties leading to its closure, including mismanagement of funds, non-payment of athletes, objectionable comments made by Ralek Gracie, and resulting backlash.

== Rules ==
The athletes compete in 20 minute, submission-only, gi or no-gi matches. There are no points given and if there is no submission, a draw is declared.

== Events ==
=== Metamoris I ===
Metamoris I was held 2012-10-14.

- #1: (Brazil) Caio Terra vs. (United States) Jeff Glover

Terra defeated Glover via submission (armbar) (13:27)

- #2: (United States) Rafael Lovato Jr. vs. (Brazil) Kayron Gracie

Lovato defeated Gracie via submission (kimura) (11:16)

- #3: (Brazil) Kron Gracie vs. (Brazil) Otavio Sousa

Gracie defeated Sousa via submission (armbar) (17:00)

- #4: (Brazil) Alexandre Ribeiro vs. (United States) Dean Lister

Ribeiro and Lister fought to a draw (20:00)

- #5: (Brazil) André Galvão vs. (United States) Ryron Gracie

Galvão and Gracie fought to a draw (20:00)

- #6: (Brazil) Roger Gracie vs. (Brazil) Marcus Almeida

Gracie and Almeida fought to a draw (20:00)

=== Metamoris II ===
Metamoris II was held 2013-06-09.

- #1: (United States) Jonathan Torres vs. (Brazil) Victor Estima

Torres and Estima fought to a draw (20:00)

- #2: (United States) Mackenzie Dern vs. (Brazil) Michelle Nicolini

Dern and Nicolini fought to a draw (20:00)

- #3: (Brazil) Roberto Abreu vs. (United States) Brendan Schaub

Abreu defeated Schaub via decision (20:00)

- #4: (Brazil) André Galvão vs. (United States) Rafael Lovato Jr.

Galvão defeated Lovato via decision (20:00)

- #5: (Brazil) Rodolfo Vieira vs. (Brazil) Braulio Estima

Vieira defeated Estima via decision (20:00)

- #6: (Brazil) Kron Gracie vs. (Japan) Shinya Aoki

Gracie defeated Aoki via submission (guillotine choke) (6:50)

=== Metamoris III ===
Metamoris III was held 2014-03-29. Executive Producer Ralek Gracie & Eddie Marquez

- #1: (United States) Zak Maxwell vs. (United States) Sean Roberts

Maxwell and Roberts fought to a draw (20:00)

- #2: (Brazil) Guilherme Mendes vs. (Brazil) Samir Chantre

Mendes defeated Chantre via submission (baseball bat choke) (6:19)

- #3: (United States) Dean Lister vs. (Brazil) Renato Sobral

Lister and Sobral fought to a draw (20:00)

- #4: (United States) Keenan Cornelius vs. (United States) Kevin Casey

Cornelius defeated Casey via submission (heel hook) (12:53)

- #5: (Brazil) Rafael Mendes vs. (United States) Clark Gracie

Mendes and Gracie fought to a draw (20:00)

- #6: (United States) Eddie Bravo vs. (Brazil) Royler Gracie

Bravo and Gracie fought to a draw (20:00)

=== Metamoris IV ===
Metamoris IV was held 2014-08-09.

- #1: (United States) Garry Tonon vs. (Australia) Kit Dale

Tonon defeated Dale via submission (guillotine choke) (3:20)

- #2: (Brazil) Saulo Ribeiro vs. (Brazil) Rodrigo Medeiros

Ribeiro and Medeiros fought to a draw (20:00)

- #3: (United States) Keenan Cornelius vs. (Brazil) Vinny Magalhães

Cornelius and Magalhães fought to a draw (20:00)

- #4 (secret match): (United States) Baret Yoshida vs. (United States) Jeff Glover

Yoshida and Glover fought to a draw (20:00)

- #5: (United States) Dean Lister vs. (United States) Josh Barnett - inaugural Metamoris Heavyweight Championship

Barnett defeated Lister via submission (chest compressor) (19:48)

- #6: (Brazil) André Galvão vs. (United States) Chael Sonnen

Galvão defeated Sonnen via submission (rear naked choke) (13:49)

=== Metamoris V ===
Metamoris V was held 2014-11-22.

- #1: (United States) Garry Tonon vs. (United States) Zak Maxwell

Tonon defeated Maxwell via submission (heel hook) (9:23)

- #2: (Brazil) Vinny Magalhães vs. (Brazil) Matheus Diniz

Magalhães and Diniz fought to a draw (20:00)

- #3: (Brazil) Yuri Simoes vs. (United States) Keenan Cornelius

Simoes and Cornelius fought to a draw (20:00)

- #4 (secret match): (United States) Jake Shields vs. (Brazil) Roberto Satoshi

Shields and Satoshi fought to a draw (20:00)

- #5: (Canada) Rory MacDonald vs. (United States) Jonathan Torres

MacDonald and Torres fought to a draw (20:00)

- #6: (Japan) Kazushi Sakuraba vs. (Brazil) Renzo Gracie

Sakuraba and Gracie fought to a draw (20:00)

=== Metamoris VI ===
Metamoris VI was held 2015-05-09.

- #1: (Ecuador) Francisico Iturralde vs. (United States) Greg McIntyre

Iturralde defeated McIntyre via straight armbar. (06:38)

- #2: (United States) Michael Liera, Jr. vs. Morgan Neidlinger

Liera and Neidlinger fought to a draw. (20:00)

- #3: (Brazil) Evandro Nunes vs. (United States) Jimmy Friedrich

Nunes and Friedrich fought to a draw. (20:00)

- #4: (United States) Clark Gracie vs. (Brazil) Roberto Satoshi

Gracie and Satoshi fought to a draw. (20:00)

- #5: (Brazil) Alexandre Ribeiro vs. (United States) Keenan Cornelius

Ribeiro and Cornelius fought to a draw. (20:00)

- #6: (United States) Dillon Danis vs. (United States) Joe Lauzon

Danis defeated Lauzon via D'arce choke. (05:41)

- #7: (United States) Chael Sonnen vs. (Brazil) Renato Sobral

Sonnen and Sobral fought to a draw (20:00)

- #8: (United States) Josh Barnett (c) vs. (United States) Ryron Gracie - Metamoris Heavyweight Championship

Barnett defeated Gracie via toehold. (12:58)

=== Metamoris VII ===
Metamoris VII was held 2016-07-17.

- #1: (United States) Stephen Martinez vs. (Brazil) Morgan Neidlinger

Martinez and Neidlinger fought to a draw (20:00)

- #2: (Brazil) Fabio Leopoldo vs. (Brazil) Eduardo Telles

Leopoldo and Telles fought to a draw (20:00)

- #3: (Japan) Satoshi Ishii vs. (Belarus) Vladimir Matyushenko

Ishii and Matyushenko fought to a draw (20:00)

- #4: (United States) Richie Martinez vs. (United States) Kevin Casey

Martinez and Casey fought to a draw (20:00)

- #5: (Brazil) Bruno Malfacine vs. (United States) Jeff Glover

Malfacine and Glover fought to a draw (20:00)

- #6: (United States) Ralek Gracie vs. (United States) Garry Tonon

Tonon defeated Gracie via kneebar

=== Metamoris VIII ===
Metamoris VIII was held 2017-11-26.

- #1: (United States) Gordon Ryan vs. (United States) Ralek Gracie

Ryan defeated Gracie via submission (reverse triangle)

- #2: (United States) Carlos Gomez vs. (United States) Danny Stolfi

Stolfi defeated Gomez via submission (double armbar)

== Commentators ==
- Rener Gracie (M1, M2, M6)
- Ed O'Neill (M2)
- Kenny Florian (M3-M5)
- Jeff Glover (M3-M8)
- Kit Dale (M5)
- Bas Rutten (M6)
- Mackenzie Dern (M7)

== See also ==
- Craig Jones Invitational
- Polaris Pro Grappling
- ADCC Submission Wrestling World Championship
