= Mike Fowler =

American martial artist

- Born: December 30, 1982 (age 42)
- Nationality: (United States) American
- Height: 5 ft 5 in (1.65 m)
- Weight: 155 lb (70 kg; 11.1 st)
- Division: Middleweight; Lightweight
- Style: Brazilian Jiu Jitsu
- Fighting out of: North Shore Jiu Jitsu Club
- Team: Rodrigo Pinheiro BJJ, San Antonio, Texas (2017-present); Team Lloyd Irvin (2001-2012)
- Rank: 3rd degree black belt in Brazilian Jiu Jitsu

Mike Fowler
Medal record

Brazilian Jiu-Jitsu/Grappling

Asian Open Championship
Silver medal – second place	2010	Middleweight (black)
Bronze medal – third place	2010	Absolute (black)
Gold medal – first place	2009	Middleweight (black)
Silver medal – second place	2009	Absolute (black)
Silver medal – second place	2008	Middleweight (black)
Gold medal – first place	2008	Absolute (black)
Gold medal – first place	2007	Middleweight (black)

American National Jiu-Jitsu Championships
Gold medal – first place	2009	Middleweight (black)
Gold medal – first place	2006	Middleweight (black)
Gold medal – first place	2005	Middleweight (black)
Gold medal – first place	2003	Lightweight (purple)
Gold medal – first place	2003	Absolute (purple)

New York Open
Silver medal – second place	2010	Middleweight (black)
Silver medal – second place	2009	Lightweight (black)

Rio Open International
Bronze medal – third place	2009	Middleweight (black)

Pan American Championships
Bronze medal – third place	2012	Featherweight (black)
Silver medal – second place	2006	Middleweight (black)
Gold medal – first place	2003	Lightweight (blue)

CBJJO Copa De Mundo
Bronze medal – third place	2005	Middleweight (brown)

USA vs. Brazil Championship
Gold medal – first place	2004	Lightweight (purple)

Michael Lee Fowler is an American martial artist who is a Brazilian Jiu-Jitsu black belt. In addition to a number of major competitive achievements, Fowler is notable for the speed at which he attained the rank and is, according to some sources, the 3rd fastest American on record to do so. He is head instructor at North Shore Jiu Jitsu Club in Haleiwa, Hawaii.

== Wrestling career ==
Although coming to the art with a background in high school wrestling, Fowler did not begin formal wrestling training until after high school in 2001, when he moved to Maryland to enter Lloyd Irvin’s advanced grappling program. Fowler’s meteoric grappling career began shortly thereafter, winning numerous private tournaments such as Grapplers Quest and achieving a Pan-American championship as a blue belt. Many championships were to follow, with career highlights of 5 American National Championships and an Asian Open Championship in the black belt division.

He also teaches numerous grappling seminars across the US.

=== ADCC ===
In 2007, Fowler was invited to the ADCC Submission Wrestling World Championship, a prestigious Submission Grappling event where despite ultimately placing 4th overall, he defeated the legendary Renzo Gracie and Saulo Ribeiro, only losing to the equally elite Marcelo Garcia by guillotine and Andre Galvao by points.
