= Michael Fowler (judge) =

British judge (born 1951)

Michael Glyn Fowler (born 20 November 1951) is a retired British Circuit judge.

He was educated at King's College London (LLB, 1973). He was called to the bar at Middle Temple in 1974 and served as a Recorder from 2000 to 2009.

He was appointed a circuit judge in 2009, and retired in 2020.
