= Keenan Cornelius =

American practitioner of Brazilian jiu-jitsu

- Born: Keenan Kai-James Cornelius; 25 February 1992 (age 34); Hilo, Hawaii, U.S.
- Other names: Black Belt Hunter; Cat boy Keenus
- Height: 6 ft 2 in (1.88 m)
- Weight: 195 lb (88 kg; 13.9 st)
- Division: Middle-heavyweight; Middleweight; Lightweight
- Style: Brazilian jiu jitsu
- Fighting out of: San Diego, California, US
- Team: Atos Jiu-Jitsu (2013-2019); Team Lloyd Irvin (2011-2013); B.J. Penn's MMA (2008-2011); Cassio Werneck Jiu-Jitsu (2006-2008)
- Rank: BJJ black belt (under Andre Galvao)

Keenan Kai-James Cornelius is an American martial artist. His competitive achievements include what is called the Double Grand Slam in Brazilian jiu-jitsu, having won double gold medals at four major tournaments: the World Jiu-Jitsu Championship, Pan-American Championship, European Open Championship, and Brazilian National Jiu-Jitsu Championship - as a purple belt. He is also known for his creation of guard techniques such as the Worm Guard.

== Early life and education ==
Cornelius's first exposure to martial arts training began at a young age, under his step-father, martial arts teacher Tom Callos, who was B.J. Penn's first Brazilian jiu-jitsu instructor. At the age of 14, he began casual grappling training with friends. Shortly thereafter, he began receiving formal Brazilian Jiu-Jitsu instruction under Cassio Werneck, then training for three years under BJ Penn, before ultimately joining with Team Lloyd Irvin. Despite his high-level victories as a purple belt and above, Keenan claims to have had a poor competitive showing early in his career, prior to his joining Team Lloyd Irvin, a move which Keenan held responsible for his later success.

== Career ==
On February 28, 2012, Keenan won the Abu Dhabi World Pro Trials Montreal Purple belt +74 kg absolute division. In April 2012 Keenan competed in the World Pro Jiu-Jitsu Cup, winning his division (-82 kg.) and earning a bronze in the absolute division. On June 26, 2012, Keenan was promoted to brown belt under Lloyd Irvin. On February 27, 2013, Keenan announced his split from Team Lloyd Irvin. A few days later, it was officially announced that he would be joining Atos Jiu-Jitsu. After his transition to Atos, Keenan continued his run as arguably the most accomplished brown belt in the history of the sport, winning nearly every major tournament at his weight and open class with the only exception being the 2013 IBJJF Brown Belt Absolute Division where he placed second. On September 14, 2013, Keenan was promoted to black belt under André Galvão. On December 8, 2013, Keenan won the medium-heavy/heavyweight division of the 2nd IBJJF Pro League for the prize of $5,000 by defeating Diego Gamoral and Jackson Souza.

On March 29, 2014, Keenan was scheduled to face Vinny Magalhaes in Metamoris III. However, Vinny was forced to withdraw before the match, being hospitalized with a MRSA infection. He was replaced by Rickson-trained black belt Kevin Casey. The match ended as a win for Keenan, using 50/50 guard and getting a submission with an inside heel hook. In April 2014 Keenan competed in the 2014 Abu Dhabi BJJ World Pro Championship, winning bronze in the black belt adult 94 kg division. On August 9, 2014, Keenan competed against Magalhaes at Metamoris IV. The match ended in a draw. On November 22, 2014, Keenan competed against Yuri Simoes at Metamoris V. The match ended in a draw. On January 10, 2015, Keenan competed against Dean Lister at Polaris Pro Grappling. He won the match with a reverse triangle choke from back control.

Cornelius famously competed in a submission-only, no time-limit match against Gordon Ryan on August 13, 2016 and was submitted with a heel hook after around 90 minutes.

Cornelius was set to fight Gabriel Almeida in the main event of Fight 2 Win 149 on August 14, 2020, but was forced to withdraw from the event due to an undisclosed injury and was replaced by Manuel Ribamar.

In 2021, Cornelius was unable to compete and was forced to withdraw from a match against Haisam Rida on Who's Number One as a result of an aggravation of an old back injury suffered when deadlifting.

== Legion Academy ==
After a falling out with his long time gym ATOS, Keenan decided to open his own gym and fight team. On August 6, 2019, he announced he would open Legion Academy in San Diego. Since launching the Legion AJJ academy, Keenan Cornelius has attracted some of ATOS' top athletes to his team including Andris Brunovskis and Darin Conner DeAngelis.

On January 19, 2021, Cornelius awarded his first BJJ black belt to long-time training partner and Slovenian Judo black belt Miha Perhavec.

Legion Jiu-Jitsu fielded a team at Subversiv 3 on August 28, 2020, that consisted of Jacob Kassama, Michael Edgley, and Paige Ivette. Their team lost 2-1 in the opening round against Fight Sports.

The gym returned with a slightly different team at Subversiv 6 on October 16, 2021, that consisted of Sloan Clymer, Miha Perhavec, and Paige Ivette. This time they took second place, losing 2-1 in the final to Checkmat.

== Technique development ==
Keenan is known in the Brazilian Jiu-Jitsu community for his creation and successful use of a unique gi guard system. Nicknamed the Worm Guard by Galvão, Keenan ties his leg to his opponents hip and opposite leg with one hand and his opponent's loose lapel, locking them into place while leaving Keenan two free limbs to attack on one side. He and others have continued to iterate and invent techniques exploiting the lapels of the Gi jacket, a trend that is credited to Keenan's initial success with Worm Guard.

== Media ==
In 2013, Cornelius published a 5-part DVD set teaching concepts of his competition style.

In 2016 Keenan Online, a membership site, began offering his curriculum.
