= Lloyd Irvin =

Jiu-Jitsu practitioner

- Born: May 17, 1969 (age 57)
- Nationality: American
- Division: Heavyweight
- Style: Brazilian Jiu-Jitsu
- Team: Lloyd Irvin Brazilian Jiu-Jitsu
- Rank: 4th deg. BJJ black belt (Note: under Leo Dalla)

Mixed martial arts record
- Total: 1
- Wins: 1
- By submission: 1
- Losses: 0

Other information
- Notable students: Dominick Cruz, Phil Davis, Brandon Vera, Mike Easton, Jonathan Torres, Marcos Torregrosa, Keenan Cornelius, Sodiq Yusuff, De'Alonzio Jackson
- Website: www.lloydirvin.com
- Mixed martial arts record from Sherdog

Lloyd Irvin Jr. is a mixed martial arts (MMA) and Brazilian Jiu-Jitsu black belt practitioner and coach. The founder of Team Lloyd Irvin, the first non-Brazilian team to take a world team title, he is the head coach to several champion grapplers.

== Biography ==
Lloyd Emory Irvin, Jr. was born May 17, 1969, training from a young age in boxing and wrestling in 1983. After watching Royce Gracie UFC fights, Irvin started training Brazilian jiu-jitsu at a gym in Rockville, Maryland under Mario Yamasaki and Leo Dalla. Receiving his blue belt after a month Irvin continued training and opened his own academy using aggressive advertising campaigns. In 2008 and 2012 Irvin won the Master 2 World No-Gi Championship Super Heavy. In 2008, Lloyd Irvin, his family, and former student Brandon Vera were the victims of a home invasion robbery. Reportedly, Irvin was able to disarm one of the robbers and send both men fleeing the residence shortly thereafter. There were no reports of injuries.

=== Team Lloyd Irvin ===
Irvin became the head coach of the eponymous Team Lloyd Irvin, a Brazilian jiu-jitsu and mixed martial arts organization operating in the Mid-Atlantic States of the U.S. A number of prominent grapplers and MMA fighters have attended his academy at one time, such as Mike Fowler, JT Torres, and Ryan Hall. Irvin's team grew to be one of the best, earning medals in some of the most prestigious Brazilian jiu-jitsu championships.

==== Sexual misconduct allegations ====
In January 2013, two of Lloyd Irvin's students (Nicholas Schultz and Matthew Maldonado) were arrested and charged for the violent rape of a female teammate on New Years Eve. Irvin came under scrutiny after it was revealed that he had been involved in a 1989 gang rape case, for which he was acquitted while his fellow defendants were all convicted. In the wake of the controversy, reports of abuse, including allegations of sexual misconduct, came up from former students of Irvin. As a result, most of the team's senior competitors, including Keenan Cornelius, JT Torres, Marcos Yemaso and Jordon Shultz left the team. A December 2013 article on the controversy in the Miami New Times, including accounts from former Irvin associates and students, claimed that students were training in a cult like environment. In March 2013 Irvin disbanded his affiliate program, citing the "lynch mob" mentality of his attackers.

== Mixed martial arts record ==
Professional record breakdown
1 match	1 win	0 losses
By submission	1	0

Res.	Record	Opponent	Method	Event	Date	Round	Time	Location	Notes
Win	1–0	Arthur Gant	Submission (heel hook)	USVTO – US Vale Tudo Open 1996	November 6, 1996	1	1:48	United States	
