= Samuel Monin =

Senegalese footballer

Personal information
- Date of birth: 3 November 1979 (age 46)
- Place of birth: Senegal
- Position: Goalkeeper

Senior career*
Years	Team	Apps	(Gls)
-2000/01	AS Monaco FC	0	(0)
2000/01-2002/03	Raith Rovers F.C.	40	(0)

International career
2001	Senegal	1	(0)
- * Club domestic league appearances and goals

Samuel Monin (born 3 November 1979 in Senegal) is a Senegalese retired footballer. Now multiple World jiu-jitsu champion of the World and MMA professional fighter. He also worked as coach for several fighters like former vacant UFC belt holder Cyril Gane.

== Career ==
After failing to make an appearance for French Ligue 1 side AS Monaco, Monin signed for Raith Rovers in the Scottish second division. While playing for them in 2001, he was linked with Celtic, one of the most successful Scottish teams, as well as English clubs Liverpool, Leicester City, Blackburn Rovers, and Bradford City. However, he never signed for any of those outfits.

In 2001, Monin made his solitary appearance for the Senegal national team, in a 2–4 loss to Burkina Faso.
