= André Galvão =

Brazilian submission grappler and mixed martial arts fighter

André Luiz Leite Galvão
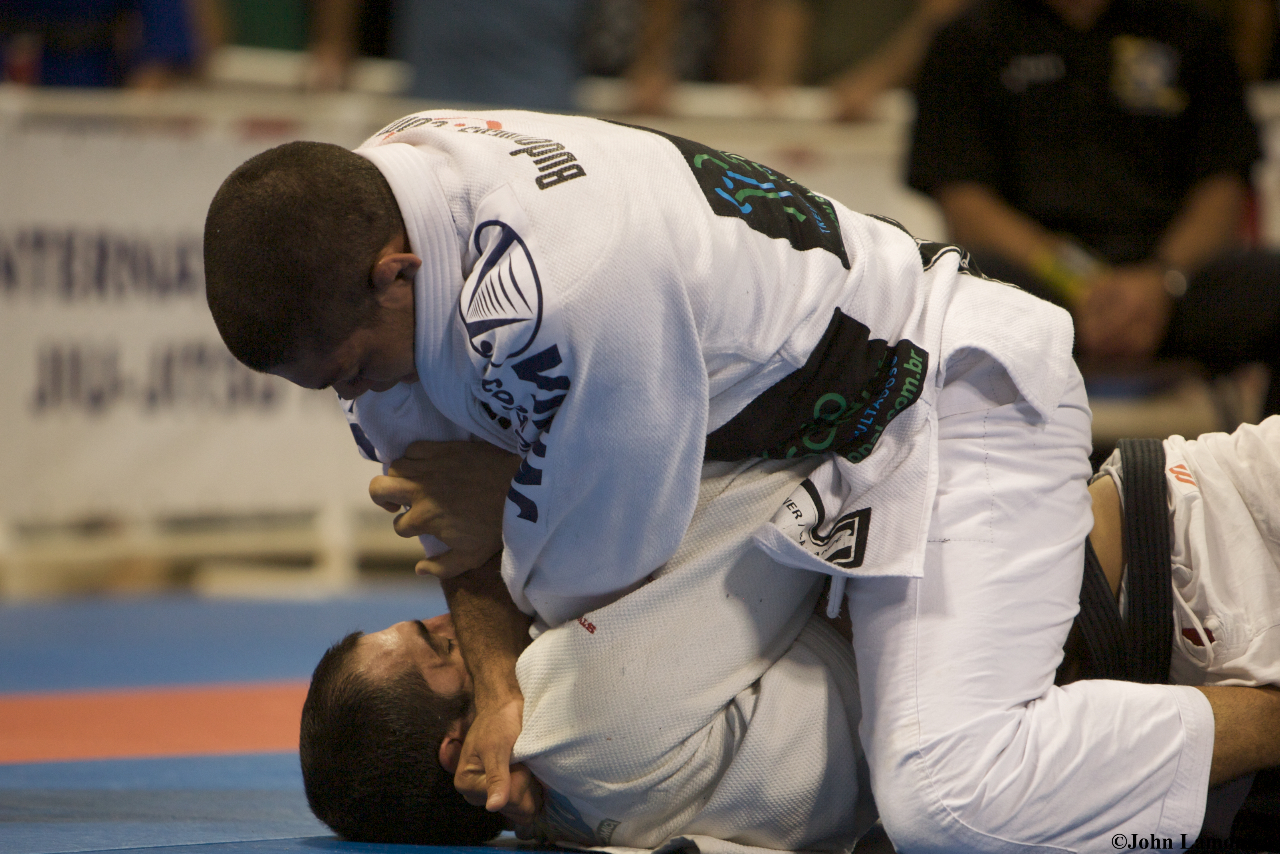
- André Galvão setting up a choke on his opponent at the 2008 World Jiu-Jitsu Championship.
- Born: September 29, 1982 (age 44); São Sebastião, São Paulo, Brazil
- Other names: Deco
- Height: 5 ft 7 in (1.70 m)
- Weight: 170 lb (77 kg; 12 st)
- Division: Welterweight
- Reach: 71.5 in (182 cm)
- Stance: Southpaw
- Fighting out of: San Diego, California, United States
- Team: Atos Jiu-Jitsu (2008-2026); Team Brasa (2007–2008); TT jiujitsu (2003–2006)
- Rank: 5th deg. BJJ black belt; Judo black belt
- Years active: 1996 – present

Mixed martial arts record
- Total: 7
- Wins: 5
- By knockout: 1
- By submission: 3
- By decision: 1
- Losses: 2
- By knockout: 1
- By decision: 1

Other information
- Mixed martial arts record from Sherdog

André Luiz Leite Galvão (Portuguese pronunciation: [ɐ̃ˈdɾɛ ɡawˈvɐ̃w]; born September 29, 1982) is a Brazilian grappler and professional mixed martial artist. A 5th degree Brazilian jiu-jitsu black belt under Fernando "Tererê" Augusto as well as a judo black belt, Galvão is one of the most decorated BJJ athletes ever, having won most major international tournaments multiple times.

Galvão is the co-founder and former head coach of Atos Jiu Jitsu, one of the most successful grappling teams in competitive sport, and a coach to numerous world champions. He is the author of the martial arts book Drill to Win: One Year to Better Brazilian Jiu-Jitsu.

In 2022, Galvão was inducted into the IBJJF Hall of Fame and the ADCC Hall of Fame.

== Submission grappling ==
Galvão has won the 2011 ADCC Submission Wrestling World Championship (weight and absolute) Brazilian National Championship, World Jiu-Jitsu Championship and Pan American Championships multiple times and has also taken third place in the 2007 ADCC Submission Wrestling World Championship at both -77 kg and openweight. Despite his frequent competition success, Galvao has stated that he only began to learn Wrestling as an adult after he moved to America in 2008.

Galvão was a competitor in the 2009 ADCC Submission Wrestling World Championship in Barcelona, Spain where he placed second in the -88 kg class. More recently, Galvao had a standout performance in 2011, first by winning the Ultimate Absolute NYC by defeating standouts Antonio Braga Neto, Vinny Magalhaes, and Rustam Cshiev. At the 2011 ADCC Submission Wrestling World Championship Galvão captured gold in both the -88 kg and absolute weight classes defeating Rousimar Palhares and Pablo Popovitch, in each respective finals.

Galvão defeated Braulio Estima by rear naked choke in their Superfight at the 2013 ADCC Submission Wrestling World Championship.

Galvão faced Chael Sonnen at Metamoris IV on August 9, 2014. He won the bout via a rear-naked choke submission.

On August 30, 2015, he defeated Roberto Abreu via points (6–0) at the 2015 ADCC Superfight.

At ADCC 2017, Galvão defeated Claudio Calasans via decision.

At ADCC 2019, Galvão defeated Felipe Pena via points (2–0).

Despite initially going back and forth on whether or not to retire from the sport altogether, Galvao confirmed in 2021 that he will be returning at least one more time to defend his ADCC superfight championships at the 2022 World Championship event. In November 2021, Galvao became part of the inaugural class of the ADCC Hall of Fame thanks to his records as the longest-serving superfight champion and most decorated competitor.

At ADCC 2022, Galvão lost his superfight title to Gordon Ryan, being submitted by a rear-naked choke.

=== Instructor lineage ===
Mitsuyo Maeda → Carlos Gracie, Sr. → Helio Gracie → Rolls Gracie → Romero Cavalcanti → Alexandre Paiva → Fernando "Tererê" Augusto → André Galvao

== Controversy ==
In early February 2026, former Atos athlete Alexa Herse publicly alleged that Andre Galvão engaged in inappropriate conduct and sexual misconduct during training, and stated that she filed a report with law enforcement. Galvão issued a public denial, calling the claims untrue and stating he would take legal steps to protect his reputation and Atos’ integrity. As of February 2026, no criminal conviction or court ruling has been reported in major news coverage. Several sources noted that some athletes, coaches, and affiliated gyms publicly announced that they were distancing themselves from Atos following the allegations. On February 4, 2026, Atos announced the immediate and indefinite release of Andre and his wife from their positions within the organization.

== Mixed martial arts ==
Galvão made his mixed martial arts debut in 2008, and in 2009 he entered DREAM's 2009 Welterweight Tournament.

Since completing the tournament, Galvão fought in Strikeforce. He earned a record of 2 wins and 1 loss in the promotion before retiring from the sport.

Despite being retired from MMA for over a decade, Galvão revealed on November 30, 2020, that he was planning on making a return to professional MMA competition at some point in 2021.

On November 8, 2021, it was announced that Galvão had signed a multi-fight contract with ONE Championship. He made his promotional debut in a grappling match against ONE Middleweight and ONE Light Heavyweight Champion Reinier de Ridder at ONE: X on March 26, 2022. They grappled to a draw after 12 minutes after neither could find the submission.

== Mixed martial arts record ==
Professional record breakdown
7 matches	5 wins	2 losses
By knockout	1	1
By submission	3	0
By decision	1	1

Res.	Record	Opponent	Method	Event	Date	Round	Time	Location	Notes
Loss	5–2	Tyron Woodley	TKO (punches)	Strikeforce: Diaz vs. Noons II	October 9, 2010	1	1:48	San Jose, California, United States	
Win	5–1	Jorge Patino	TKO (punches)	Strikeforce: Houston	August 21, 2010	3	2:45	Houston, Texas, United States	
Win	4–1	Luke Stewart	Decision (split)	Strikeforce Challengers: Johnson vs. Mahe	March 26, 2010	3	5:00	Fresno, California, United States	
Loss	3–1	Jason High	Decision (split)	Dream 10	July 20, 2009	2	5:00	Saitama, Saitama, Japan	DREAM Welterweight Grand Prix Semi-Final Round
Win	3–0	John Alessio	Submission (armbar)	Dream 8	April 5, 2009	1	7:34	Saitama, Saitama, Japan	DREAM Welterweight Grand Prix Opening Round
Win	2–0	Mikey Gomez	Submission (armbar)	FSC: Evolution	December 14, 2008	1	3:59	Ontario, Canada	
Win	1–0	Jeremiah Metcalf	Submission (armbar)	JG and TKT Promotions – Fighting 4 Kidz	August 30, 2008	2	2:05	Santa Monica, California, United States	

== Submission grappling record ==
Result	Opponent	Method	Event	Division	Date	Location
Loss	(United States) Gordon Ryan	Submission (rear naked choke)	ADCC 2022	Superfight	September 18, 2022	(United States) Las Vegas, NV
Draw	(Netherlands) Reinier de Ridder	Draw	ONE: X	Superfight	March 26, 2022	(Singapore) Kallang
Win	(Brazil) Felipe Pena	Points (2–0)	ADCC 2019	Superfight	September 29, 2019	(United States) Los Angeles, CA
Win	(Brazil) Claudio Calasans	Points (6–0)	ADCC 2017	Superfight	September 23, 2017	(Finland) Espoo
Loss	(Brazil) Leandro Lo	Referee Decision	IBJJF Pro League	Absolute	August 26, 2017	(United States) Las Vegas, NV
Win	(Brazil) Alexandre Ribeiro	Referee Decision	IBJJF Pro League	Absolute	August 26, 2017	(United States) Las Vegas, NV
Win	(Brazil) Patirick Gaudio	Referee Decision	IBJJF World Championships	-88 kg	June 4, 2017	(United States) Long Beach, CA
Win	(Brazil) Felipe Pena	Points (2–0)	IBJJF World Championships	-88 kg	June 4, 2017	(United States) Long Beach, CA
Win	(Australia) Kit Dale	Points (9–0)	IBJJF World Championships	-88 kg	June 4, 2017	(United States) Long Beach, CA
Win	(Brazil) Jorge Britto	Submission (kimura)	IBJJF World Championships	-88 kg	June 4, 2017	(United States) Long Beach, CA
Win	(Brazil) Eduardo Telles	Points (8–0)	IBJJF San Diego Open	Superfight	May 13, 2017	(United States) San Diego, CA
Win	(Brazil) Jackson Souza	Referee Decision	IBJJF World Championships	-94 kg	June 5, 2016	(United States) Long Beach, CA
Win	(Brazil) Cassio Francis	Advantages	IBJJF World Championships	-94 kg	June 5, 2016	(United States) Long Beach, CA
Win	(Brazil) Lucas Rocha	Penalty	IBJJF World Championships	-94 kg	June 5, 2016	(United States) Long Beach, CA
Win	(Brazil) Felipe Mota	Submission (choke)	IBJJF World Championships	-94 kg	June 5, 2016	(United States) Long Beach, CA
Win	(Brazil) Bruno Bastos	Submission (rear naked choke)	Fight2Win Pro	Superfight	May 8, 2015	(United States) San Diego, CA
Loss	(Brazil) Felipe Pena	Points (0–4)	World Pro	-94 kg	April 22, 2016	(United Arab Emirates) Abu Dhabi
Win	(Brazil) Jackson Souza	Submission (wristlock)	World Pro	-94 kg	April 22, 2016	(United Arab Emirates) Abu Dhabi
Win	(Brazil) Tiago Pessoa	Points (2–0)	World Pro	-94 kg	April 22, 2016	(United Arab Emirates) Abu Dhabi
Loss	(Brazil) Erbeth Santos	Advantages	World Pro	Absolute	April 21, 2016	(United Arab Emirates) Abu Dhabi
Win	(Brazil) Davi Ramos	Advantages	World Pro	Absolute	April 21, 2016	(United Arab Emirates) Abu Dhabi
Win	(Brazil) Patrick Gaudio	Advantages	World Pro	Absolute	April 21, 2016	(United Arab Emirates) Abu Dhabi
Win	(Brazil) Romulo Barral	Points (1–0)	Berkut 2	Superfight	November 21, 2015	(Russia) Moscow
Win	(Brazil) Igor Silva	Technical Submission (injury)	IBJJF European Championship	Absolute	January 25, 2015	(Portugal) Lisbon
Win	(Brazil) Renato Cardoso	Points (4–0)	IBJJF European Championship	-88 kg	January 25, 2015	(Portugal) Lisbon
Win	(Brazil) Rodrigo Fajardo	Submission (choke)	IBJJF European Championship	-88 kg	January 25, 2015	(Portugal) Lisbon
Win	(Brazil) Martin Aedma	Submission (choke)	IBJJF European Championship	-88 kg	January 25, 2015	(Portugal) Lisbon
Win	(France) Samuel Monin	Submission (armbar)	IBJJF European Championship	-88 kg	January 25, 2015	(Portugal) Lisbon
Win	(Brazil) Tarcisio Jardim	Submission (armbar)	IBJJF European Championship	Absolute	January 24, 2015	(Portugal) Lisbon
Win	(Brazil) Erbeth Santos	Submission (north/south choke)	IBJJF European Championship	Absolute	January 24, 2015	(Portugal) Lisbon
Win	(Norway) Thomas Johannesson	Submission (armbar)	IBJJF European Championship	Absolute	January 24, 2015	(Portugal) Lisbon
Win	(Sweden) Gabriel Rosberg	Submission (choke)	IBJJF European Championship	Absolute	January 24, 2015	(Portugal) Lisbon
Win	(Brazil) Roberto Abreu	Points (6–0)	ADCC 2015	Superfight	August 29, 2015	(Brazil) São Paulo
Win	(United States) Chael Sonnen	Submission (rear-naked choke)	Metamoris IV	Superfight	August 9, 2014	(United States) Los Angeles, CA
Win	(Brazil) Braulio Estima	Submission (rear naked choke)	ADCC 2013	Superfight	October 19, 2013	(China) Beijing
Draw	(United States) Ryron Gracie	Draw	Metamoris I	Superfight	October 14, 2012	(United States) Los Angeles, CA
Win	(Brazil) Pablo Popovitch	Submission (toe hold)	ADCC 2011	Absolute	September 25, 2011	(United Kingdom) Nottingham
Win	(Brazil) Murilo Santana	Points (0-0)	ADCC 2011	Absolute	September 25, 2011	(United Kingdom) Nottingham
Win	(Brazil) Sergio Moraes	Points (6–0)	ADCC 2011	Absolute	September 25, 2011	(United Kingdom) Nottingham
Win	(Japan) Shinsho Anzai	Submission (rear naked choke)	ADCC 2011	Absolute	September 25, 2011	(United Kingdom) Nottingham
Win	(Brazil) Rousimar Palhares	Points (9–4)	ADCC 2011	-88 kg	September 25, 2011	(United Kingdom) Nottingham
Win	(Brazil) Pablo Popovitch	Points (2–0)	ADCC 2011	-88 kg	September 25, 2011	(United Kingdom) Nottingham
Win	(Iceland) Gunnar Nelson	Points (2–0)	ADCC 2011	-88 kg	September 24, 2011	(United Kingdom) Nottingham
Win	(United States) Don Ortega	Points	ADCC 2011	-88 kg	September 24, 2011	(United Kingdom) Nottingham
Win	(Russia) Rustam Chsiev	Judges Decision	Ultimate Absolute NYC	Absolute	July 30, 2011	(United States) New York City, NY
Win	(Brazil) Vinny Magalhães	Points (4–0)	Ultimate Absolute NYC	Absolute	July 30, 2011	(United States) New York City, NY
Win	(Brazil) Antônio Braga Neto	Points (2–0)	Ultimate Absolute NYC	Absolute	July 30, 2011	(United States) New York City, NY
Win	(United States) Nolan Dutcher	Submission (armbar)	Ultimate Absolute NYC	Absolute	July 30, 2011	(United States) New York City, NY
Loss	(Brazil) Alexandre Ribeiro	Points (0–3)	ADCC 2009	Absolute	September 27, 2009	(Spain) Barcelona
Win	(United States) Tom DeBlass	Points (3–0)	ADCC 2009	Absolute	September 27, 2009	(Spain) Barcelona
Loss	(Brazil) Braulio Estima	Submission (inverted triangle choke)	ADCC 2009	-88 kg	September 27, 2009	(Spain) Barcelona
Win	(United States) David Avellan	Points (2–0)	ADCC 2009	-88 kg	September 27, 2009	(Spain) Barcelona
Win	(France) Kassim Annan	Points (11–0)	ADCC 2009	-88 kg	September 26, 2009	(Spain) Barcelona
Win	(United States) Chris Weidman	Points (4–0)	ADCC 2009	-88 kg	September 26, 2009	(Spain) Barcelona
Win	(Brazil) Bruno Bastos	Submission (rear naked choke)	ADCC Brazilian Championship 2009	-88 kg	February 21, 2009	(Brazil) São Paulo
Win	(Brazil) Rodolfo Vieira	Points	ADCC Brazilian Championship 2009	-88 kg	February 21, 2009	(Brazil) São Paulo
Win	(Brazil) Alexandre Ferreira	Submission (rear naked choke)	ADCC 2007	Absolute	May 6, 2007	(United States) Trenton, NJ
Loss	(United States) Robert Drysdale	Submission (rear naked choke)	ADCC 2007	Absolute	May 6, 2007	(United States) Trenton, NJ
Win	(Brazil) Fabricio Werdum	Points	ADCC 2007	Absolute	May 6, 2007	(United States) Trenton, NJ
Win	(United States) Baret Yoshida	Points	ADCC 2007	Absolute	May 6, 2007	(United States) Trenton, NJ
Win	(United States) Mike Fowler	Points	ADCC 2007	-77 kg	May 5, 2007	(United States) Trenton, NJ
Loss	(Brazil) Pablo Popovitch	Points	ADCC 2007	-77 kg	May 5, 2007	(United States) Trenton, NJ
Win	(Canada) Mark Bocek	Submission (heel hook)	ADCC 2007	-77 kg	May 4, 2007	(United States) Trenton, NJ
Win	(United States) Chris Bright	Points	ADCC 2007	-77 kg	May 4, 2007	(United States) Trenton, NJ
Win	(Brazil) Rafael dos Anjos	Submission (heel hook)	ADCC Brazilian Championship 2007	-77 kg	February 4, 2007	(Brazil) Rio de Janeiro

== Published works ==
- Drill to Win: One Year to Better Brazilian Jiu-Jitsu (Victory Belt Publishing, 2010).

The book focuses on "learning the transitional skills of Brazilian Jiu-Jitsu and submission wrestling through proper diet, calisthenics, and technical drills".

== See also ==
- List of Brazilian jiu-jitsu practitioners
- List of current ONE fighters
