= Grapplers Quest =

Grappling promoter

- Company type: Private
- Industry: Submission grappling and Brazilian jiu-jitsu tournament promotion
- Founded: 1998
- Founder: Brian Cimins
- Headquarters: Wayne, NJ, United States
- Website: grapplersquest.com

Grapplers Quest is an organization mainly concerned with the promotion of submission grappling and Brazilian jiu-jitsu tournaments. Founded in 1998 by Brian Cimins, Grapplers Quest hosts competitions of various division, age, and weight classes.

Grapplers Quest has been host to many high-level competitors in mixed martial arts, such as Matt Hughes, Frankie Edgar, Ben Henderson, Kenny Florian, Diego Sanchez, Joe Stevenson, B.J. Penn, and Brandon Vera.

== History ==
Grapplers Quest, as part of the Grapplers Company, Inc., was founded by Brian Cimins for his Senior Marketing and Public Relations Thesis at the Richard Stockton College of New Jersey in 1996. The first Grapplers Quest was held on April 24, 1999, at Montclair High School in Montclair, New Jersey.

The organization has also branched out to form partnerships with the Ultimate Fighting Championship and the non-profit AutismRadio.org, among others.

== Divisions ==
The following is a sample of the divisions used by Grapplers Quest divided into their respective weight brackets.

=== Youth ===
	YOUTH; Up to 6 Years Old (No-Gi & Brazilian Jiu-Jitsu)	YOUTH; 7–9 Years Old (No-Gi & Brazilian Jiu-Jitsu)	YOUTH; 10–12 Years Old (No-Gi & Brazilian Jiu-Jitsu)	TEENS; 13–15 Years Old (No-Gi & Brazilian Jiu-Jitsu)	TEENS; 16–17 Years Old (No-Gi & Brazilian Jiu-Jitsu)
Lightweight	–49.9 lb	–59.9 lb	–79.9 lb	–99.9 lb	–119.9 lb
Middleweight	50–59.9 lb	60–69.9 lb	80–89.9 lb	100–114.9 lb	120–134.9 lb
Cruiserweight	60–69.9 lb	70–79.9 lb	90–99.9 lb	115–129.9 lb	135–149.9 lb
Heavyweight	+70 lb	+80 lb	+100 lb	+130 lb	150–169.9 lb
Superweight	N/A	N/A	N/A	N/A	+170 lb

=== Women ===
	NO-GI BEGINNER; Less than 12 Months Training	NO-GI ADVANCED; More than 12 Months Training	BRAZILIAN JIU-JITSU WHITE BELT	BRAZILIAN JIU-JITSU BLUE BELT	BRAZILIAN JIU-JITSU PURPLE, BROWN & BLACK BELT
Class A	–119.9 lb	–119.9 lb	–119.9 lb	–119.9 lb	N/A
Class B	120–139.9 lb	120–139.9 lb	120–139.9 lb	120–139.9 lb	N/A
Class C	140–159.9 lb	140–159.9 lb	140–159.9 lb	140–159.9 lb	N/A
Class D	+160 lb	+160 lb	+160 lb	+160 lb	N/A
Absolute	Openweight	Openweight	N/A	N/A	Openweight

=== Men ===
Men's No-Gi
Weight class	NOVICE; Less than 9 Months Training; No Wrestlers	BEGINNER; 9–18 Months Training	INTERMEDIATE; 18–36 Months Training	ADVANCED; More than 36 Months Training
Bantamweight	–129.9 lb	–129.9 lb	–129.9 lb	–129.9 lb
Flyweight	130–139 lb	130–139 lb	130–139 lb	130–139 lb
Featherweight	140–149 lb	140–149 lb	140–149 lb	140–149 lb
Lightweight	150–159 lb	150–159 lb	150–159 lb	150–159 lb
Welterweight	160–169 lb	160–169 lb	160–169 lb	160–169 lb
Middleweight	170–179 lb	170–179 lb	170–179 lb	170–179 lb
Cruiserweight	180–189 lb	180–189 lb	180–189 lb	180–189 lb
Light Heavyweight	190–199 lb	190–199 lb	190–199 lb	190–199 lb
Heavyweight	200–209 lb	200–209 lb	200–209 lb	200–209 lb
Super	+210 lb	+210 lb	+210 lb	+210 lb
Absolute	Openweight	Openweight	Openweight	Openweight

== Rules ==
=== No-Gi ===
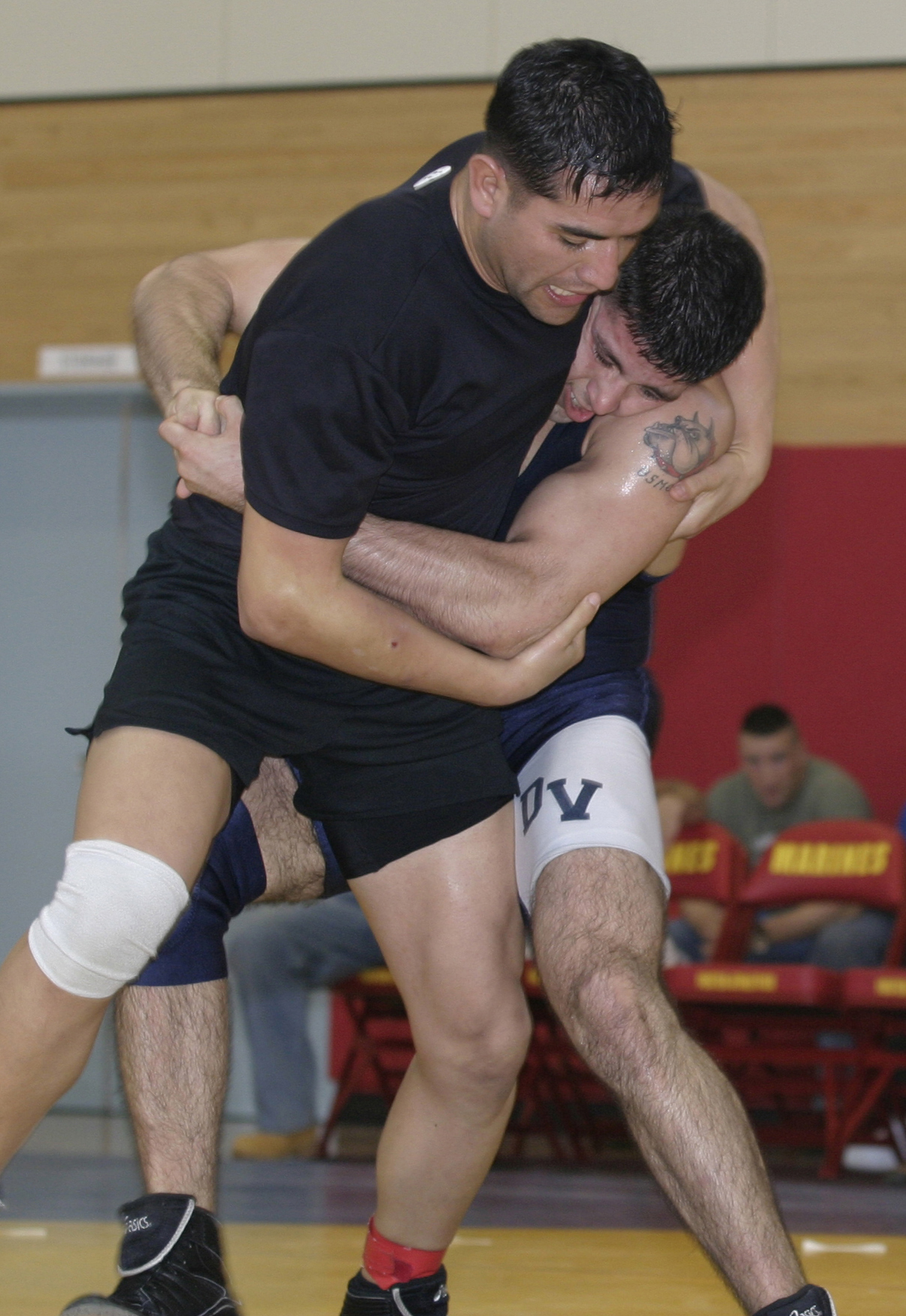
Example of no-gi grappling competition

Grapplers Quest uses a scoring system similar to that used by the ADCC Submission Fighting World Championship. Unlike the ADCC however, there is a use of advantage points to determine the winner of a match rather than force a judges' decision. Also unlike the ADCC, Grapplers Quest restricts the use of certain leg lock techniques to particular divisions.

The following is a list of the standard match times for each no-gi division.

Round time	Divisions
4 Minutes	Children & Teens, Women's Beginner, Men's Novice & Men's Beginner
5 Minutes	Men's Intermediate, Women's Intermediate & Men's Executive & Masters
6 Minutes	Men's & Women's Advanced

=== Brazilian Jiu-Jitsu ===
Grapplers Quest uses a simplified version of the IBJJF scoring system for Brazilian jiu-jitsu matches, though one which still retains the use of subjective advantage points. Similarly to the no-gi divisions, there is a restriction of certain leg lock techniques to differing divisions.

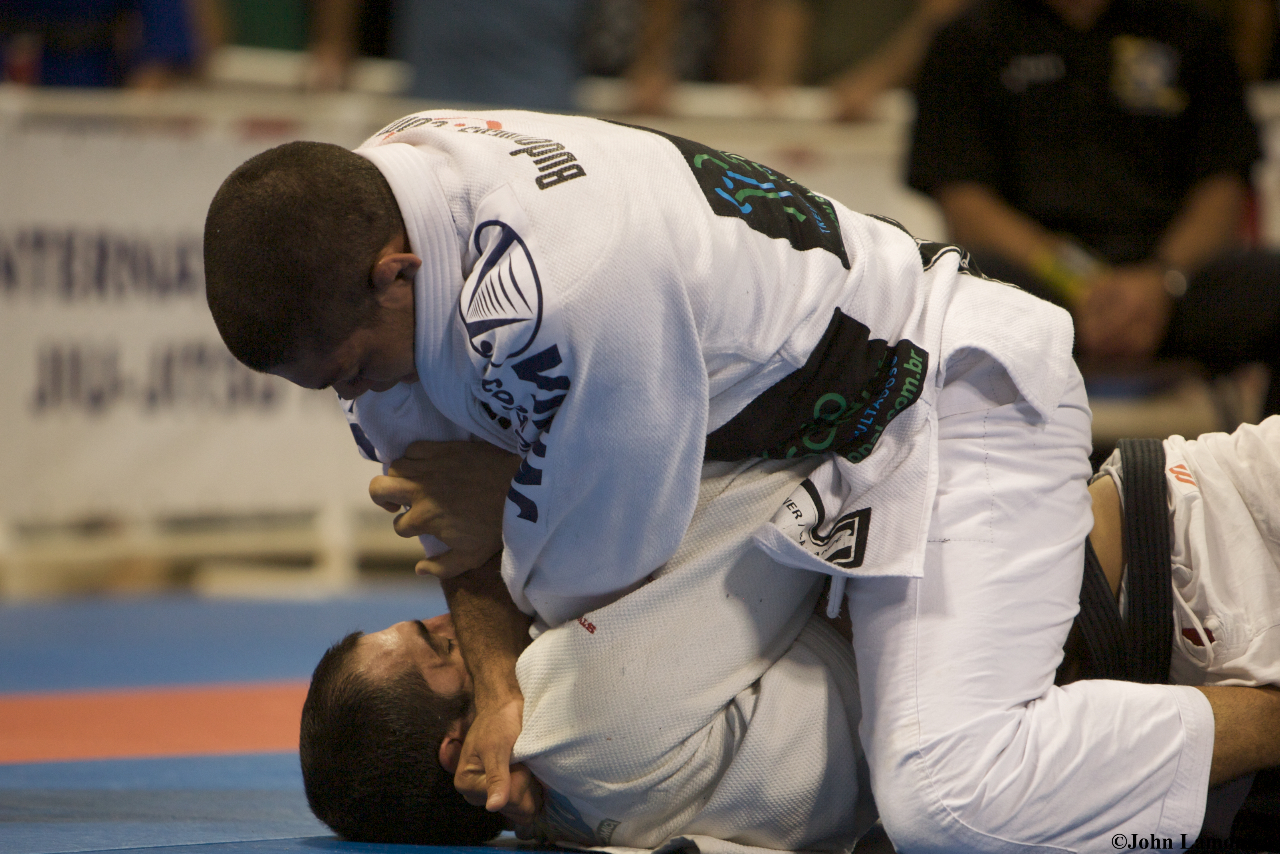
Example of practitioners in Gi BJJ Competition

The following is a list of the standard match times for each Brazilian jiu-jitsu division.

Round time	Divisions
4 Minutes	Children & Teens
5 Minutes	White Belts
6 Minutes	Blue Belts
7 Minutes	Purple Belts
8 Minutes	Brown Belts
10 Minutes	Black Belts

== Results ==
=== Overall Team Results 2011 ===
The following are the team results from 2011 World Series of Grappling, presented by Grapplers Quest.

Division	1st (Gold)		2nd (Silver)		3rd (Bronze)	
Division	Team Name	Points	Team Name	Points	Team Name	Points
Overall Combined Team	Carlson Gracie	270	Drysdale's JJ	122	Cobra Kai	92
Men's Overall Team	Cobra Kai	81	Charles Gracie	68	Drysdales JJ	61
Woman's Overall Team	Paragon	25	Coachella Valley BJJ	24	Ralph Gracie	19
Teen's Overall Team	Carlson Gracie	90	Sergio Penna	27	Drysdale's JJ	35
Children's Overall Team	Carlson Gracie	127	Drysdale's JJ	36	Gracie Humaitá	34

=== Overall Team Results 2010 ===
The following are the team results from 2010 World Series of Grappling, presented by Grapplers Quest and Revgear.

Division	1st (Gold)		2nd (Silver)		3rd (Bronze)	
Division	Team Name	Points	Team Name	Points	Team Name	Points
Overall Combined Team	Team Lloyd Irvin	367	Team Jungle Gym	148	Renzo Gracie Combat Team	87
Men's Overall Team	Team Lloyd Irvin	151	Renzo Gracie Combat Team	85	Team Jungle Gym	64
Woman's Overall Team	Team Brasa Fifty, ECUBJJ, Team Lloyd Irvin	24	Dave Trader BJJ	19	Team All Rules	16
Teen's Overall Team	Team Lloyd Irvin	103	Alliance Jiu Jitsu	48	Team Jungle Gym	20
Children's Overall Team	Team Lloyd Irvin	89	Team Jungle Gym	66	Team Pellegrino	50
