= Claudio Calasans =

Brazilian Jiu-Jitsu practitioner

- Born: October 11, 1983 (age 41); São José dos Campos, Brazil
- Division: Middleweight
- Team: ATOS
- Rank: Black belt in Brazilian Jiu-Jitsu under Erivaldo Junior

Claudio Calasans
Medal record

Representing Brazil

Men's Submission Wrestling

ADCC World Championship
Gold medal – first place	2015 São Paulo, Brazil	Absolute

ADCC South American Championship
Gold medal – first place	2011 Rio de Janeiro, Brazil	-88kg
Gold medal – first place	2013 Rio de Janeiro, Brazil	-88kg
Gold medal – first place	2015 São Paulo, Brazil	-88kg

Brazilian Jiu-Jitsu

World Championship
Gold medal – first place	2015 California, USA	-82kg

Pan American Championship
Gold medal – first place	2011 California, USA	-82kg
Gold medal – first place	2012 California, USA	-82kg

World Cup
Gold medal – first place	2010 Abu Dhabi, UAE	-83kg
Gold medal – first place	2010 Abu Dhabi, UAE	Absolute
Gold medal – first place	2011 Abu Dhabi, UAE	-83kg
Gold medal – first place	2012 Abu Dhabi, UAE	-82kg

Claudio Calasans (born in São Paulo, Brazil) is a Brazilian Jiu Jitsu (BJJ) world champion and ADCC Absolute champion.
