= The Snake Pit (Wigan) =

Wrestling gym and organisation in England

Coordinates: 53.5658°N 2.5866°W

- Also known as: Riley's; Riley's Gym 蛇の穴 / スネーク・ピット; Aspull Olympic Wrestling Club; Aspull Wrestling Club; Wigan
- Date founded: 1948
- Country of origin: England
- Founder: Billy Riley
- Current head: Roy Wood, Andrea Wood
- Arts taught: Catch wrestling Freestyle wrestling
- Ancestor arts: Lancashire wrestling
- Practitioners: Karl Gotch; Billy Robinson; Bert Assirati; Jack Dempsey (Note: Ring name of professional wrestler Tommy Moore. Not to be confused with the world heavyweight boxing champion of the same name.); Billy Joyce; Les Thornton; Dynamite Kid; Maria Dunn; See more
- Official website: snakepitwigan.com

The Snake Pit, based in Aspull, Wigan Borough, England, is the gym and organisation regarded as the modern home of catch wrestling. Founded in 1948 by Billy Riley in the town of Wigan, it was originally known as Riley's Gym. Riley was succeeded by Roy Wood, one of his last living students. It hosts the Aspull Olympic Wrestling Club, which focuses on freestyle wrestling. (Note: Not to be confused with the Aspull Warriors Wrestling Club.) Wood was recognised on the 2024 New Year Honours and awarded a British Empire Medal (BEM) "for services to wrestling and young people" after coaching for almost 50 years. An exhibition about Riley and the gym began at the Leigh Town Hall in April 2024.

The gym has had a significant influence on the evolution of catch-as-catch-can (CACC), freestyle, and professional wrestling, as well as mixed martial arts (MMA), especially in Japan. Riley was the head coach for over 20 years, teaching Lancashire style catch wrestling, and the gym became known in Britain and internationally for producing skilled wrestlers. Riley closed the gym in the early 1970s due to the decline of legitimate skills in pro wrestling, but it was soon revived through a community effort with Roy Wood becoming head coach, assisted by Riley and other veteran wrestlers. The gym switched to freestyle wrestling, producing champions and international competitors, and hosting the Aspull Freestyle Wrestling International for over 35 years. The gym moved to Aspull during this time, establishing the Aspull Olympic Wrestling Club.

The gym continued to be one of the most essential sources for preserving catch wrestling and began to formally promote the style again in 2012 through competitions, training, and certification. The Snake Pit has organised the Catch Wrestling World Championships since 2018, and also organises the British Championships and other competitions.

== History ==
=== Riley's Gym ===
Billy Riley was a skilled professional wrestler in a time when there were still legitimate matches. Riley trained in pubs like the Crispin Arms or at his home before he and a handful of other wrestlers, who were also tradesmen, combined their resources to purchase a plot of land and build a dedicated gym in the Whelley area of the town of Wigan. The gym opened in 1948 to teach catch-as-catch-can (CACC), freestyle, and professional wrestling (termed "show wrestling") in the Lancashire style.

The original building was described as a shed or shack with a tin roof, bare bricks inside, a worn wrestling mat stuffed with horse hair, a coal stove for heat, no toilet, rusting weights, and a shower in the corner that only had cold water. Riley was an active coach, known for hard training. He demanded every opponent be approached as world-class, even novices, and frequently used phrases like “you can never train too hard” and "do it again." Riley wanted to be confident in his trainees' skills and did not let them work shows otherwise. He also kept a room of books and reference materials for wrestling. Billy Joyce and other veteran wrestlers would regularly coach alongside Riley. Many of the trainees were mine workers and hoped to boost their incomes by wrestling. There was a common saying that someone reaching into a local mine would grab either a wrestler or rugby player. The professionals usually trained in the morning and worked shows in the evening, then the wrestlers with regular jobs trained after work. Since there had been legitimate wrestlers in every family, it became impossible to hold theatrical-style pro wrestling in Wigan. Riley did not make much money as a coach because he kept his member fees modest. In 1964, they were only two shillings and six pence (2s. 6., a half crown, equivalent to £2.2 in 2025), despite a wrestler like Karl Gotch reportedly earning £30,000 (equivalent to £531,281.3 in 2025) annually. Although the training was tough and many visitors were one-time-only, the gym had unwritten rules against breaking limbs, eye-poking, hair-pulling, and similar behaviour. Women and children were also disallowed in those days.

The gym produced some of the most skilled wrestlers of their time, such as Karl Gotch, Billy Robinson, Bert Assirati, Jack Dempsey, Les Thornton, and Billy Joyce (Bob Robinson). Other wrestlers from the gym included Ernie Riley (Billy Riley's son), Joe Robinson (Billy Joyce's brother), Melvyn Riss (Harold Winstanley), John Foley, Alan Latham (Francis Sullivan), Mick and Seamus Dunleavy, Billy Chambers, Len Wetherby, Jackie Cheers, Frank Riley, Jimmy Hart, Alan Hartwood, Harry Duvall, Ken Baldwin, John Naylor, Brian Burke, and Roy Wood. As well as Bob Sherry (Jimmy Niblett), El Diablo (Tony Francis), George Gregory, Count Bartelli (Geoff Condliffe), Jack Mountford, Johnny Eagle (Roy Boyd), and Tommy Heyes.

The gym became well-known internationally and hosted wrestlers from countries including France, Belgium, Italy, Finland, Spain, India, Pakistan, Turkey, the United States, and Canada. Riley also encouraged his wrestlers to bring knowledge back from other gyms and styles. During Billy Robinson's eight years at Riley's, he was sent to Hungary to learn Greco-Roman wrestling, and to Sweden and Germany. Gotch, Robinson, Joyce, Thornton, and other Riley's wrestlers toured Japan, where the wrestlers and their style developed an enduring popularity. Rumours of the gym's reputation inspired the "Tiger's Den" in Tiger Mask, a manga and anime series about pro wrestling, and Robinson inspired the manga/anime character Robin Mask.

Although Riley's was the most well-known gym, it had several rivals such as the Belshaws, who were a family of undertakers that specialised in takedowns. They had been trained by Billy Riley's coach Willie "Pop" Charnock, who also had his own gym.

Riley's was featured in "The Wrestlers", a documentary by ITV Granada, which premiered on 5 September 1967. The documentary focused on the lives and personalities of popular pro wrestlers outside the ring, featuring Billy Robinson, Les Kellett, Johnny Eagle, Vic Faulkner, Abe Ginsberg, Jim Hussey, Alan Dennison, and Roy "Bull" Davis, along with Billy Riley. It was directed by Michael Elster, filmed by David Wood, produced by Denis Mitchell, edited by Leonard Trumm, with sound recording by John Muxworthy.

==== Revival ====
By the 1970s, the theatrical elements of pro wrestling had completely overtaken legitimate wrestling ability and Riley closed his famous gym. However, the gym was revived when Roy Wood's son Darren and a friend wanted to wrestle, but it needed repairs first. Using materials donated by Bill Swiers, a group of locals rebuilt the gym to twice the original size. Wood then became the head coach and Riley returned to mentor from his chair, along with Tommy Heyes. Riley's converted to freestyle wrestling because there were no opportunities for catch wrestlers in Britain coupled with safety concerns for training youth. Riley's grandsons Mark and Paul, and nephew Patrick Burns also trained at the revived gym. After a lifetime in wrestling, Billy Riley died in September 1977.

The gym consistently produced British champions and top competitors. In 1986, Darren Wood won gold in freestyle wrestling at the European Cadets Championship followed by gold at the 1987 Cadet World Championships and the 1987 British Senior Championships.

On 7 February 1989, the documentary series First Tuesday premiered "The Wigan Hold", produced by Roger Finnegan, focusing on Riley's gym. The piece focused on the lives of Ernie Riley and Tommy Moore (Jack Dempsey); Riley, Moore, and Roy Wood coaching youth; retrospectives on wrestling history in Wigan, Billy Riley, the gym, and theatrical pro wrestling. It also included archival footage from "The Wrestlers" documentary of Riley coaching a young Wood. The deteriorating state of the facility and lack of resources shown on the programme prompted a government offer to renovate the gym. Instead, the decision was made to relocate, establishing the Aspull Olympic Wrestling Club (AOWC). The original gym was later demolished after a fire and houses were built on the land.

=== The Aspull Olympic Wrestling Club ===
In 1990, Japanese pro wrestlers Kazuo Sakurada and KY Wakamatsu approached Billy Joyce, who directed them to Wood, with an offer to coach in Japan for Super World of Sports (SWS). After a training session, Wood and Joyce took them to the ruins of Riley's, where the visitors looked noticeably upset by the famed gym's condition and offered financial assistance to rebuild it. Wood then travelled to Japan and coached the SWS roster in Lancashire-style catch wrestling. He ended his tour with an exhibition match in front of 17,000 spectators at Yokohama Arena. During this trip, Wood broke the leg of a Japanese wrestler who challenged him, which convinced the others of his ability. Wood was offered a position as a coach in Japan but declined due to his life in England, choosing to visit periodically.

In 1993, the club had another visitor from Japan, Osamu Matsunami. An 18-year-old Matsunami had learned about the club from an article about Dynamite Kid in Weekly Gong magazine (No. 257, 25 May 1989). A quote by Joyce in the article inspired Matsunami's interest in Lancashire wrestling, which grew when Wood coached for SWS in 1990. In May 1993, Matsunami made his first trip to the club, despite knowing little English or the location. After an extended journey and the assistance of several people, Matsunami met Wood, who introduced Matsunami to his family and the community. Matsunami accompanied Wood for several days, including wrestling practices, meeting Riley's wrestlers, and visiting the ruins of Riley's. His visit was covered by the Wigan Post. Matsunami made several more journeys to Wigan, staying for several months at a time. He trained with Wood, Ernie Riley, Billy Joyce, and several other wrestlers, and helped Wood coach kids classes. Matsunami also competed, including a trip to France early-on and placing fifth at the 1995 British Freestyle Wrestling Championships. He opened his own gym in Kyoto, Japan in December 2006. Wood named it "Riley's Gym Kyoto" while visiting in spring 2007.

In 1995, Osamu Nishimura visited and trained at the gym. Soon after, Wood was recruited by Nishimura's mentor Tatsumi Fujinami, a popular pro wrestler and then-president of New Japan Pro Wrestling (NJPW), to train NJPW's roster. In Japan, Wigan and Riley's were regarded as the spiritual home of wrestling, and Fujinami viewed CACC as the foundation of pro wrestling and wanted it to be preserved. Wood was accompanied by five wrestlers including Shane Rigby, a three-time Commonwealth silver medallist from Bolton Olympic Wrestling Club, who learned catch wrestling under Wood. After the success of the first tour, Wood coached in Japan several more times and NJPW held several Lancashire wrestling-style shows featuring Wood's wrestlers under the brand "Muga" (無我; selflessness).

Other visitors from Japan included Shigeo Miyato, Yoji Anjo, and UWF booker Shinji Sasazaki. In 1999, Miyato established a gym based on Riley's, the UWF Snake Pit Japan (now CACC Snake Pit Japan), with Billy Robinson and Lou Thesz as the first head coaches.

In 2000, Roy Wood and his daughter Andrea helped establish freestyle wrestling programs at several schools in Greater Manchester, one of which quickly won back-to-back British championships for boys and girls. Wood had pushed for more female participation in wrestling since the Aspull Olympic Wrestling Club's opening. He also worked with the St Helens and Wigan Warriors rugby clubs to introduce wrestling into professional rugby. During Wood's six years coaching St Helens, the team won the Challenge Cup multiple times. Paul Stridgeon, a student of Wood and a British freestyle champion, transitioned to professional rugby, and coached the England national team and Wales national team.

In 2008, Wood coached the British wrestling team for the Commonwealth Youth Games in India. In April 2009, Wood was voted as the England-Northern representative for British Wrestling's then-newly established Nations & Regions Committee. In May 2010, AOWC was among the first clubs to receive British Wrestling's Clubmark certification.

Wood coached Maria Dunn, a freestyle wrestler from Guam, for the 2012 Olympics. Wood and Ben Johnson also served as torchbearers for the Olympic flame. Dunn later married Bolton wrestling coach Nathan Tully and they founded the Snakepit Wrestling Academy in Guam. Tully died in 2020 after a battle with cancer. The Nathan Tully award "for dedication to grassroots/paying it forward" is presented in his memory at the Catch Wrestling World Championships.

The club hosted the Aspull Freestyle Wrestling International for 35 years as of 2012.

==== Recognitions ====
In February 2009, Wood was named "coach of the year" at the ninth annual Wigan and Leigh Borough Sports Awards for mentoring coaches, coaching British wrestlers at the Commonwealth Youth Games, and preparing 2012 Olympic hopefuls. Nicky Slack, also from AOWC, was named "volunteer of the year."

In 2011, Wood was the North West regional winner of the BBC Sports Unsung Hero Award, recognising "outstanding contribution by individuals at the grassroots level of sport." In November 2012, Wood received the "coach of the year" and the "be inspired" awards at the Greater Manchester Sports Awards, and AOWC was named "club of the year" at the Borough Sports Awards.

In December 2023, after almost 50 years of coaching, Wood was recognised on the 2024 New Year Honours and awarded a British Empire Medal (BEM) "for services to wrestling and young people." The medal was presented to Wood in a ceremony at Gorton Monastery by Diane Hawkins, the Lord Lieutenant of Greater Manchester, in October 2024.

=== The Snake Pit ===
The gym was simply known as "Riley's" in Britain. The "Snake Pit" (蛇の穴 / スネーク・ピット) name, often used anachronistically, was popularised in Japan. Wood was unaware of the "Snake Pit" moniker until his trip to coach in Japan for SWS.

The Snake Pit took its current form around 2011. Due to prior frustrations, Wood maintained his focus on freestyle wrestling until his daughter, Andrea, convinced her father to help preserve the sport of catch wrestling by coaching again. Alongside the 35th Aspull Freestyle Wrestling International in November 2012, The Snake Pit held the first catch wrestling matches to take place in Wigan in fifty years, with participants from Britain and Europe, the United States, Canada, and Japan. The Snake Pit also held its first certification that month. Osamu Matsunami and Ian Bromley became the first certified coaches and Riley's Gym Kyoto became the first certified affiliate gym. Since then, The Snake Pit has held regular workshops, competitions, and annual "international weeks" for foreign visitors. Wood has also travelled to the United States several times to promote the revival of catch wrestling.

The Snake Pit marked its 70th anniversary with the first annual Catch Wrestling World Championships on 2 November 2018. The event was held at the University of Bolton Stadium and featured competitors from the United Kingdom, Ireland, the United States, South Africa, Sweden, Lithuania and New Zealand.

After the death of coach Ian Bromley in February 2019, The Snake Pit partnered with the charity Andy's Man Club (AMC) to raise awareness and combat stigma around mental health. The 2019 Catch Wrestling World Championships in November were held in tribute to Bromley. A message from the charity's founder and footage of Bromley's final interview were played between matches. A voluntary group was also set up, promoting the hashtag #17:17. (Note: Proverbs 17:17 A friend loves at all times, and a brother is born for a time of adversity.) AMC donated wristbands, flyers and other items to be given out at the event. The award for best/outstanding wrestler at the World Championships was named in Bromley's honour. The number of entrants for the event doubled from the previous year, including accomplished grapplers and mixed martial artists such as Olga McGlinchey (2012 world championships bronze medallist and Olympian), UFC fighters John Hathaway and Tom Watson, and Nathaniel Brown, a 2019 British freestyle silver medallist.

In January 2022, documents found in the Snake Pit's archives helped reveal Britain's first black Olympian - Louis Bruce, a biracial wrestler and tram driver from Edinburgh, Scotland. It was previously thought that Harry Edward was Britain's first black Olympian.

After a two-year postponement due to the COVID-19 pandemic, the Catch Wrestling World Championships took place on 4 June 2022 at the University of Bolton Stadium. The event featured 33 competitors wrestling in a total of 29 matches.

The Snake Pit held the 2023 Catch Wrestling British Championships on 5 August at Robin Park Leisure Centre in Wigan, England. The tournament was open to competitors residing in the British Isles.

The 2023 Catch Wrestling World Championships took place on 28 October at the University of Bolton Stadium. Previous champions Josh Barnett and Owen Livesey faced each-other in the headline bout. This event had the most international competitors to date, including an American team assembled by Barnett - the ACWA Warbringers, all of whom reached the finals in their divisions.

In April 2024, Leigh Town Hall began hosting an exhibition about Billy Riley, catch wrestling, and the gym. Supported by funding from the National Lottery Community Fund, it preserves and displays memorabilia contributed to the collection by The Snake Pit and others.

The Snake Pit held the 2024 Catch Wrestling British Championships on 10 August at Robin Leisure Park in Wigan, England. They were followed by the 2024 Catch Wrestling World Championships on 7 September at The Edge in Wigan. The two-day event was supported by the local government and was the first time that the town of Wigan hosted the World Championships. Over fourteen nations were represented, including the USA, Australia, Japan, Georgia, Afghanistan, Sudan, and the Netherlands. Along with the World Championships, there was a competition for children called Catch For Kids.

== Notable people ==
=== Head coaches ===
- Billy Riley (1948–1970s) - founder of the gym, wrestler, coach, and promoter
- Roy Wood BEM (1970s–present) - born in 1943 to a family of boxers, Wood joined Riley's when he was fifteen; he was a molder by trade and began "show" wrestling after Riley told him "you can't eat medals, turn professional and earn some money", and boxing for Matt Moran's fairgrounds boxing booth. In December 2023, after coaching for almost 50 years, Wood was recognised on the 2024 New Year Honours and awarded a British Empire Medal (BEM) "for services to wrestling and young people"

=== Original gym ===
Under head coach Billy Riley:

- Karl Gotch - 1948 Olympic wrestler, pro wrestler, coach, nicknamed "God of Wrestling" in Japan, major influence on development of MMA
- Billy Robinson - 1957 British freestyle wrestling champion, pro wrestler, coach, influenced development of MMA
- Billy Joyce - pro wrestler, regarded as Riley's most skilled legitimate wrestler
- Bert Assirati - pro wrestler and strongman
- Jack Dempsey - pro wrestler
- Les Thornton - pro wrestler

=== Revived gym ===
Under head coach Roy Wood:

- Dynamite Kid - pro wrestler, known for his rivalry with MMA pioneer Satoru Sayama (the original Tiger Mask)
- Darren Wood - Roy's son, won gold at the 1986 European and 1987 World Championships for cadets, and 1987 British Senior Championships
- Kazuo Sakurada and KY Wakamatsu - pro wrestlers
- Osamu Nishimura - pro wrestler
- Tatsumi Fujinami - pro wrestler, hall of famer; Fujinami's son LEONA also trained under Wood
- Shane Rigby - Commonwealth Games and Championships silver medallist from Bolton WC, trained in CACC by Roy Wood
- Paul Stridgeon - British freestyle wrestling champion, international competitor; professional rugby coach
- Shigeo Miyato - pro wrestler, founded the UWF/CACC Snake Pit Japan in 1999
- Mike Grundy - UFC fighter, 2014 Commonwealth bronze medallist, started with Wood as a child, trained with Rigby for MMA
- St Helens R.F.C. - professional rugby club, multi-time Challenge Cup champions while training with Wood
- Maria Dunn - freestyle wrestling Olympian from Guam, coached by Roy Wood for the 2012 Olympics
- Jack Gallagher - WWE wrestler and MMA fighter

==== Certified coaches ====
The Snake Pit's certified coaches are Greg Crompton, Chris Lomas and Rikk Georgiades along with assistant coaches Kevin Lloyd, Wei Tran, Mark Ganaden, .

=== Riley's Gym Kyoto ===
At present, Riley's Gym Kyoto is the only Snake Pit certified affiliate club in the world. Its head coach, Osamu Matsunami, made several extended trips to Wigan to train with Wood and other Riley's wrestlers, and trained in Tokyo with Billy Robinson and Shigeo Miyato. Matsunami opened the gym in December 2006 and it was named in Riley's honour by Wood when he visited in spring 2007. Matsunami and Ian Bromley were the first two coaches to be certified in 2012.

== Legacy and influence ==
The gym has been well-known in Britain and internationally for decades, being regarded as a home and mecca for wrestling due to its influence on catch-as-catch-can, professional, and freestyle wrestling, as well as mixed martial arts (MMA). The gym's Lancashire catch-as-catch-can style produced some of the most popular and skilled professionals of their time (see above) before transitioning to freestyle wrestling and consistently developing top wrestlers and British champions, with pro wrestlers occasionally training there as well. The gym became one of the most essential sources to preserve catch wrestling as the style struggled to survive.

Outside of Britain, the gym's influence has been felt most in Japan, where Riley's wrestlers including Karl Gotch, Billy Robinson, Billy Joyce, Les Thornton, Dynamite Kid, and others regularly toured, with Gotch and Robinson in particular becoming very popular in the country. The gym's reputation was an inspiration for the "Tiger's Den" in Tiger Mask, a manga and anime series about pro wrestling, and Robinson inspired the character Robin Mask in the Kinnikuman manga/anime series.

Along with their in-ring careers, Gotch and Robinson became prolific coaches and trained students in the Riley's style for decades. Gotch was a trainer at the JWA and NJPW dojos, and a booker for NJPW. His students included Antonio Inoki, Tatsumi Fujinami, Satoru Sayama (the first Tiger Mask), Yoshiaki Fujiwara, Akira Maeda, Nobuhiko Takada, Minoru Suzuki, and Masakatsu Funaki. Robinson's students included Kazushi Sakuraba, Kiyoshi Tamura, Shigeo Miyato, and Hideki Suzuki. Gotch, Robinson, and their students innovated a realistic pro wrestling style, leading to Muhammad Ali vs. Antonio Inoki, the UWF and Pro Wrestling Fujiwara Gumi, and setting a foundation for modern MMA. Sayama founded Super Tiger Gym followed by Shooto in 1985, to combine catch wrestling with striking for legitimate competition. Shooto held its first professional event in 1989, several years before the UFC was established. In 1993, Suzuki and Funaki co-founded and competed in Pancrase, a shootfighting promotion which held its first event a month before UFC 1. Gotch suggested the name as a reference to the ancient Olympic sport of pankration. Maeda founded RINGS, a shoot-style pro wrestling promotion that transitioned to MMA. And Takada co-founded PRIDE, one of the most popular MMA promotions in history. These promotions and their associated training facilities produced many of the top Japanese and international MMA fighters of their time. Among them were Sakuraba and Tamura. Sakuraba utilised catch wrestling to regularly defeat the best fighters of his time despite often being much smaller, and was nicknamed "The Gracie Hunter" for his victories over four members of the Gracie jiu-jitsu family including Royce, Royler, and Renzo. Tamura performed well at the top levels of MMA, later founding the gym U-FILE CAMP and the promotion U-STYLE. Other notable gyms include Kiguchi Dojo, founded by Sayama's associate Noriaki Kiguchi, who also founded combat wrestling; Paraestra, founded by Sayama's student Yuki Nakai; and CACC Snake Pit Japan, founded by Miyato as UWF Snake Pit Japan, with Robinson and Lou Thesz as the first head coaches.

After establishing itself in Japan, the style expanded abroad. In 1989, Shooto instructor Yorinaga Nakamura immigrated to the United States. He became training partners with Dan Inosanto and they established the first Shooto school outside of Japan. In 1993, Ken Shamrock brought the style from Pancrase to the UFC, became the inaugural Pancrase Champion and UFC Superfight Champion, and founded the first MMA team, the Lion's Den. Americans Maurice Smith and Frank Shamrock, and the Dutch Bas Rutten also trained in the catch-based Pancrase style and went on to become UFC champions. Erik Paulson trained under Nakamura and Inosanto, becoming a Shooto champion and coach. According to Paulson, the Shooto submission lock-flows are all based on the Riley's style. Paulson coached notable fighters including Brock Lesnar, Sean Sherk, Renato Sobral, Cub Swanson, and Lesnar's team on The Ultimate Fighter 13, which included winner Tony Ferguson. In 1994, Matt Hume began his MMA career fighting in Pancrase. Hume was a pioneer of American MMA, having co-founded the AMC Pankration gym several years prior to combine grappling and striking. He cited Suzuki, Funaki, and Ken Shamrock as significant influences on his career. Hume was a primary coach for world champions Josh Barnett, Demetrious Johnson, Jeff Monson, and Rich Franklin. Barnett became one of the most prominent modern catch wrestlers, also trained under Robinson and Paulson, and coached Shayna Baszler, Jessamyn Duke, Marina Shafir, and Victor Henry. He founded the American Catch Wrestling Association (ACWA), which assembled a dominant team for the 2023 Catch Wrestling World Championships. The ACWA then held the first modern US National Championships for catch wrestling in December 2023, with over 90 wrestlers competing across 10 weight classes.

After Wood coached her for the 2012 Olympics, Maria Dunn and her husband Nathan Tully, a Bolton wrestling coach, established the Snakepit Wrestling Academy in Guam.

Wood also worked with the St Helens and Wigan Warriors rugby clubs to introduce wrestling into professional rugby, with St Helens winning the Challenge Cup soon after. He coached the club for six years. Paul Stridgeon, a student of Wood and a British freestyle champion, transitioned to professional rugby, coaching with the Wasps, Toulon, Broncos, England national team, and Wales national team.

== Snake Pit Championships ==
The Snake Pit organises the Catch Wrestling World Championships, British Championships, and other competitions for the sport.

=== 2018 World Championships ===
The Snake Pit held its first Catch Wrestling World Championships on 2 November 2018 at the University of Bolton Stadium, featuring competitors from the United Kingdom, Ireland, the United States, South Africa, Sweden, Lithuania and New Zealand. Results:

Champions
100+ kg Super heavyweight	100 kg Heavyweight	90 kg Light heavyweight	82 kg Middleweight
Josh Barnett USA	Wade Barrick UK ENG	John Hathaway UK ENG	Greg Crompton UK ENG
74 kg Welterweight	68 kg Lightweight	74 kg Female	63 kg Female
Dominic Dillon UK ENG	John Byrne IRE	Sami Fletcher UK ENG	Chareen Millward UK ENG

Challenge matchː Josh Barnett and heavyweight runner-up Ian Jones wrestled to a draw

Heavyweight champion Wade Barrick received the "best wrestler" award, Ian Bromley, Ian Jones, and Greg Crompton were recognised for coaching, and Roy Wood received a lifetime achievement award for sixty years of service.

=== 2019 World Championships ===
The 2019 Catch Wrestling World Championships took place on 1 November at the University of Bolton Stadium. The event was held in memory of coach Ian Bromley. Results:

Champions
100+ kg Super heavyweight	100 kg Heavyweight	82 kg Middleweight	74 kg Welterweight	68 kg Lightweight	63 kg Female Featherweight
Chris Lomas UK ENG	Ian Jones UK ENG	John Hathaway (2) UK ENG	Dinu Bucalet ROM	Brett Hawthorn UK WAL	Olga McGlinchey UK UKR

Challenge matchː John Hathaway def. Nathaniel Brown

Hathaway received the Ian Bromley trophy as "best male wrestler of the night" and Olga McGlinchey received the Arthur Silcock trophy as "best female wrestler of the night."

=== 2022 World Championships ===
After a two-year postponement due to the COVID-19 pandemic, the Catch Wrestling World Championships took place on 4 June 2022 at the University of Bolton Stadium. The event featured 33 competitors wrestling a total of 29 matches. Results:

Champions
100+ kg Super heavyweight	100 kg Heavyweight	90 kg Light heavyweight	82 kg Middleweight	74 kg Welterweight	68 kg Lightweight
Chris Lomas (2) UK ENG	Owen Livesey UK ENG	Bobby Warde UK ENG	John Hathaway (3) UK ENG	Tommy Hawthorn UK WAL	Brett Hawthorn (2) UK WAL

Additionally, Tommy Hawthorn was awarded the Ian Bromley Cup as "best wrestler of the night", Greg Crompton received the Nathan Tully Award for "dedication to grassroots/paying it forward", and John Hathaway received the Jack Carroll award for fastest win (pin or submission).

=== 2023 British Championships ===
The 2023 Catch Wrestling British Championships took place on 5 August at Robin Park Leisure Centre in Wigan, England. Entries were open to competitors residing in the British Isles. Results:

Champions
100+ kg Super heavyweight	100 kg Heavyweight	90 kg Light heavyweight	82 kg Middleweight	74 kg Welterweight	68 kg Lightweight	59 kg Bantamweight
Khizar Rehman	Wade Barrick	Adam Berry	Johnny White	Ben Robson	Alex King-Zhang	Gareth Melia

=== 2023 World Championships ===
The 2023 Catch Wrestling World Championships took place on 28 October at the University of Bolton Stadium. Previous champions Josh Barnett and Owen Livesey faced each-other in the headline bout. Results:

Champions
100+ kg Super heavyweight	100 kg Heavyweight	90 kg Light heavyweight	82 kg Middleweight
John Olivieri USA	Angel Verduzco USA	Brett Pfarr USA	Thomas Higgins USA
74 kg Welterweight	68 kg Lightweight	63 kg Featherweight	59 kg Female Bantamweight
Finlay Marshall UK SCO	Jonathan Powell USA	Ewan Lister UK ENG	Nikki Hilton UK ENG

Superfightː Owen Livesey (2022 heavyweight champion) defeated Josh Barnett (2018 super heavyweight champion)

Angel Verduzco was named the Ian Bromley Cup "outstanding wrestler", Brett Pfarr was named "best male wrestler of the night", Nikki Hilton was named "best female wrestler of the night", Jordan Stott received the Nathan Tully award for "dedication to grassroots/paying it forward", and Mike Clark received the Jack Carroll award for fastest win (pin or submission).

=== 2024 British Championships ===
The 2024 Catch Wrestling British Championships took place on 10 August at Robin Leisure Park in Wigan, England. Resultsː

Champions
100+ kg Super heavyweight	100 kg Heavyweight	90 kg Light heavyweight	82 kg Middleweight
Adam Khawaja	Ian Jones	John Hathaway	Ben Robson (2)
74 kg Welterweight	68 kg Lightweight	63 kg Featherweight	59 kg Bantamweight
Connor Bishop	Joshua Clossick	Giovanni Di Clemente	Harry Meadows

59 kg Women's Bantamweight	Freya See

=== 2024 World Championships ===
The 2024 Catch Wrestling World Championships took place on 7 September at The Edge in Wigan, England as part of a two-day event. It was the first time that the town of Wigan hosted the World Championships. Wrestlers from fourteen nations competed, including the USA, Australia, Japan, Georgia, Afghanistan, Sudan, and the Netherlands. Resultsː

Male champions
100+ kg Super heavyweight	100 kg Heavyweight	90 kg Light heavyweight	82 kg Middleweight
Michael Kroells USA	Angel Verduzco (2) USA	Brett Pfarr (2) USA	Thomas Higgins (2) USA
74 kg Welterweight	68 kg Lightweight	63 kg Featherweight	59 kg Bantamweight
Finlay Marshall (2) UK SCO	Connor Bishop UK ENG	Giovanni De Clemente ITA	Harry Meadows UK ENG

Female champions
74 kg	68 kg	55 kg
Bo Geibe USA	Briana Kellin USA	Bryony Tyrell UK ENG

Additionally, Connor Bishop received the Ian Bromley Cup "outstanding wrestler" award, Thomas Higgins received the "best male wrestler" award, Bo Geibe received the "best female wrestler award", and Leo Hawthorn received the Jack Carroll award for fastest win (pin or submission).
