= Les Thornton =

British professional wrestler (1934–2019)

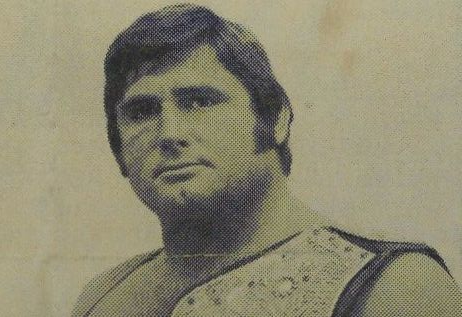

Personal information
- Born: 9 April 1934 Manchester, England, UK
- Died: 1 February 2019 (aged 84) Calgary, Alberta, Canada

Professional wrestling career
- Ring name(s): Les Thornton; Henri Pierlot; Checkmate
- Billed height: 5 ft 9 in (1.75 m)
- Billed weight: 225 lb (102 kg)
- Trained by: Billy Riley; The Snake Pit
- Debut: 1957
- Retired: 1991

Les Thornton (9 April 1934 – 1 February 2019) was a British professional wrestler who competed in Great Britain, Japan, and North America throughout the 1970s and 1980s most notably for Joint Promotions, Stampede Wrestling, the World Wrestling Federation, and various National Wrestling Alliance territories.

== Professional wrestling career ==
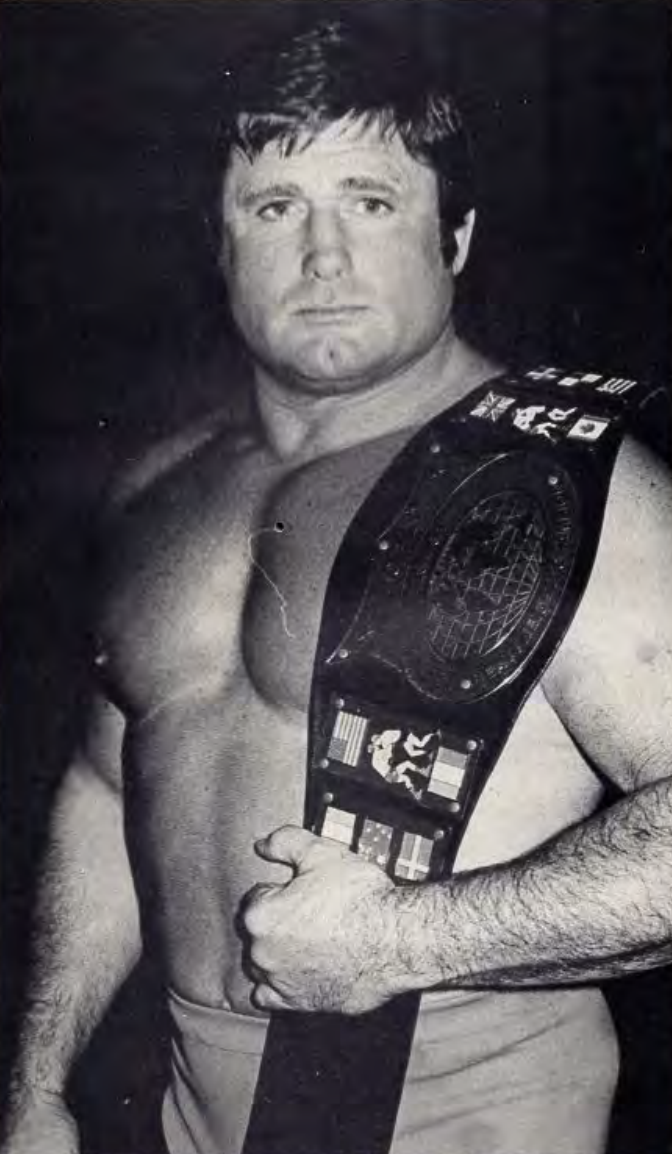
Thorton as the NWA World Junior Heavyweight Champion, circa 1984

Thornton participated in cricket, football, boxing and rugby as a youth. He served in the British Navy, being stationed in Korea, where he continued boxing. Thornton later played professional rugby before being convinced to give professional wrestling a try by wrestler Bomber Bates. Thornton trained at Billy Riley's gym in Wigan, known infamously as the Snake Pit, where he built his foundations in amateur, catch, and professional wrestling. In professional wrestling, he was known for his stiff forearm uppercuts, over the knee backbreakers, and suplexes. During his career, he was considered one of the best junior heavyweights in the world, having held the NWA World Junior Heavyweight title six times. He had matches against top junior heavyweight wrestlers including Tiger Mask, Gino Hernandez, The Cobra, Dynamite Kid, Terry Taylor, Jerry Brisco, Al Madril, and Tatsumi Fujinami. Thorton also sometimes competed as a heavyweight; against heavyweights he notably fought Harley Race, Billy Robinson, Gene Lewis, Dory Funk Jr., and Pedro Morales. As a result of the hostile takeover by the World Wrestling Federation (WWF) of Georgia Championship Wrestling, Thornton joined the WWF, but in the "Hogan Era" as it stood, Thornton was often used as a jobber. On July 8, 1985, he took part in the King of the Ring, defeating Steve Lombardi in the first round before being defeated in the second round by Don Muraco. Thornton was Mick Foley's tag team partner in Foley's first ever WWF match against The British Bulldogs. Near the end of his career, he formed his own promotion in Calgary called the Canadian Independent Wrestling Federation, which included wrestlers like Ricky Fuji and Big Titan, among others.

== Championships and accomplishments ==
- All Japan Pro Wrestling
  - World's Strongest Tag Determination League Technique Award (1980) - with Billy Robinson
- Championship Wrestling from Florida
  - NWA Florida Junior Heavyweight Championship (1 time)
- Georgia Championship Wrestling
  - NWA Georgia Tag Team Championship (1 time) - with Tony Charles
- Middle Atlantic States Wrestling
  - MASW National Heavyweight Championship (1 time)
- National Wrestling Alliance
  - NWA World Junior Heavyweight Championship/WWF Lt. Hvywt Championship (6 times)^{1}
- NWA Big Time Wrestling
  - NWA Texas Tag Team Championship (1 time) - with Tony Charles
- NWA Hollywood Wrestling
  - NWA Americas Heavyweight Championship (1 time)
- NWA New Zealand
  - NWA British Empire Commonwealth Heavyweight Championship (New Zealand version) (1 time)
- Pacific Northwest Wrestling
  - NWA Pacific Northwest Tag Team Championship (1 time) - with Moondog Mayne
- Pro Wrestling Illustrated
  - PWI ranked him # 320 of the 500 best singles wrestlers of the PWI Years in 2003
- Ring Around The Northwest Newsletter
  - Tag Team of the Year (1977) with Lonnie Mayne
- Stampede Wrestling
  - Stampede British Commonwealth Mid-Heavyweight Championship (1 time)
  - Stampede North American Heavyweight Championship (2 times)
  - Stampede Wrestling Hall of Fame (Class of 1995)
- Western States Sports
  - NWA Western States Tag Team Championship (1 time) - with Jerry Kozak
- World Wrestling Council
  - WWC World Junior Heavyweight Championship (2 times)

^{1}Only five of Thornton's reigns as NWA World Junior Heavyweight Champion are officially recognized by the National Wrestling Alliance.
