= Snake pit (disambiguation) =

A snake pit is a place of horror, torture, and death in European legends and fairy tales.

== Arts ==
=== Music ===
- "The Snakepit", a song by The Cure from their 1987 album Kiss Me, Kiss Me, Kiss Me
- "The Snakepit", a song by Ice from their 1990 album Bad Blood
- "Snakepit", a song by Ozric Tentacles from their 1990 album Erpland
- "Sssnakepit", a song by Enter Shikari from their album A Flash Flood of Colour

=== Other ===
- The Snake Pit, a 1948 film
- Snake Pit, a 1984 video arcade game made by Sente Games
- "Snake Pit", a short story by Connie Faddis from the collection Star Trek: The New Voyages 2
- Snakepit, a book by Ugandan author Moses Isegawa

== Wrestling ==
=== Catch wrestling gyms ===
- The Snake Pit (Wigan), a catch wrestling gym founded by Billy Riley in Wigan, England
- UWF/CACC Snake Pit Japan, a catch wrestling gym founded by Shigeo Miyato in Tokyo, Japan, based on the Snake Pit in Wigan

=== Other ===
- The Snake Pit, nickname for Leeman-Turner Arena at Grace Hall, home of the Lehigh Mountain Hawks wrestling program
- The Snake Pit, a professional wrestling talk segment on WWE programming, hosted by Jake "The Snake" Roberts

== Other uses ==
- Snake Man of La Perouse, also known as The Snake Pit, a reptile show in Sydney, Australia
- Snake Pit, a former gay bar in Greenwich Village, New York, US; see Stonewall riots
- Snakepit (game), a variant of the logic puzzle Hidato
- Snake Pit (Indianapolis Motor Speedway), the nickname for a section of the infield at the Indianapolis Motor Speedway

== See also ==
- Slash's Snakepit, a rock band formed by guitarist Slash
- Loreal pit, the deep depression in either side of the head in crotaline snakes
  - Pit viper, a subfamily of snakes
