= Nelson hold =

Grappling hold from behind an opponent

Nelson Hold
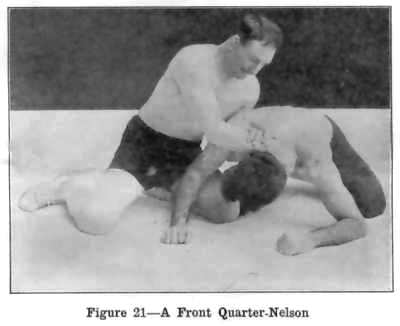
- Classification: Joint-lock
- Style: Catch wrestling
- AKA: Nelson

A nelson hold is a grappling hold which is executed by one person from behind the opponent, generally when both are on the mat face down with the opponent under the aggressor. One or both arms are used to encircle the opponent's arm under the armpit, and secured at the opponent's neck. Several different nelson holds exist, and they can be separated according to the positioning of the encircling arm(s). A nelson is used to control an opponent or to turn them over onto their back and execute a pin.

The etymology of the term is uncertain. According to the Oxford English Dictionary, the term first appeared as "full Nelson" in an 1873 Pall Mall Gazette article where a coroner commented on its danger following a wrestling match. The name is perhaps a reference to Admiral Horatio Nelson, in whose honor several other terms were named, such as "Nelson's blood" (rum).

== Variations ==
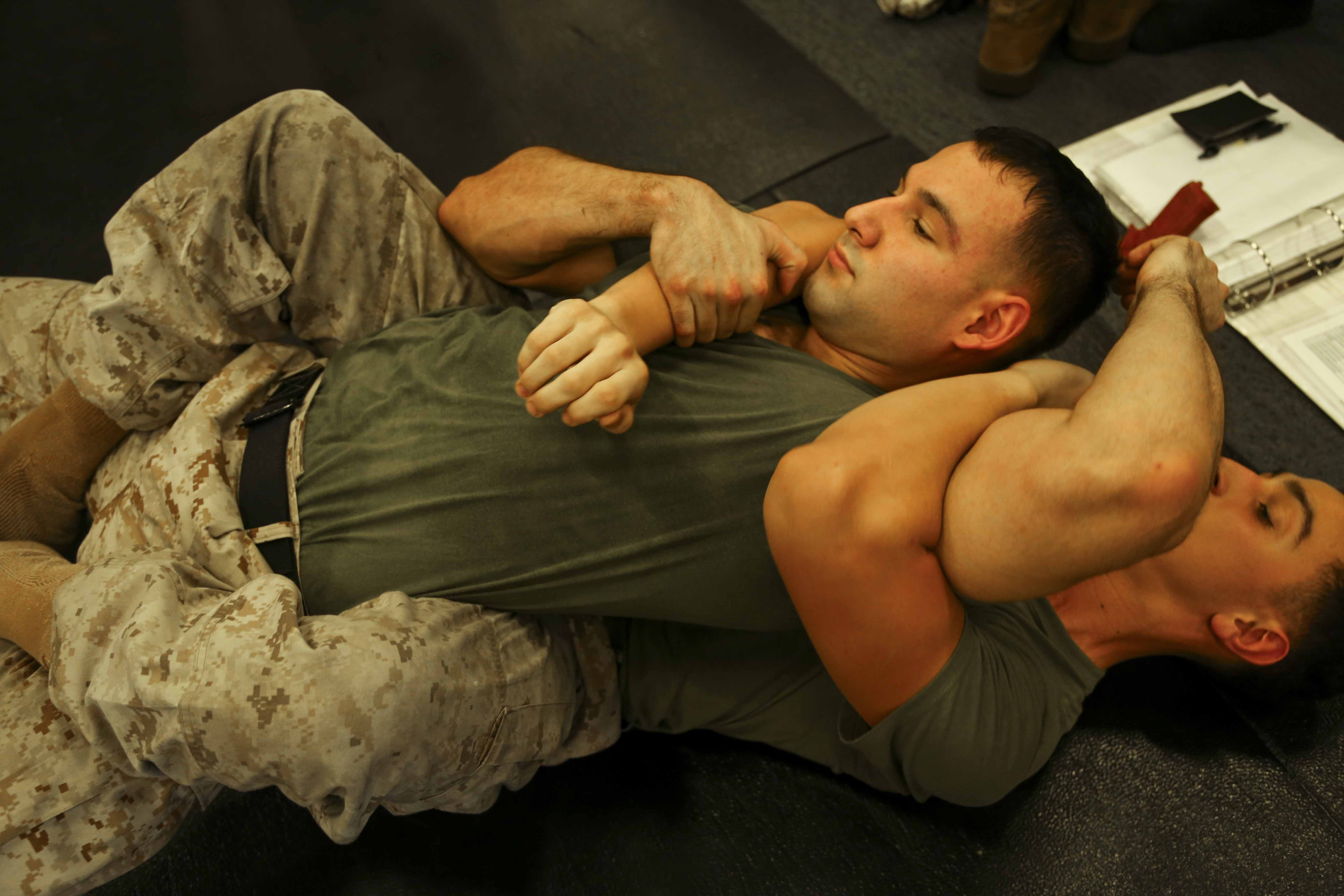
A half nelson executed from the supine position

=== Quarter nelson ===
The quarter nelson involves putting one hand on the opponent's neck or grabbing the opponent's chin, passing the free arm under the arm of the opponent, and locking the free arm to the other arm by clasping the wrist. In amateur wrestling a strong quarter nelson can be used to secure a pin, or to control the opponent and advance into a more dominant position. Note the images from 1874.

=== Half nelson ===
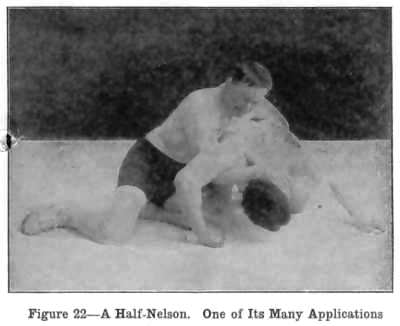
Half nelson.

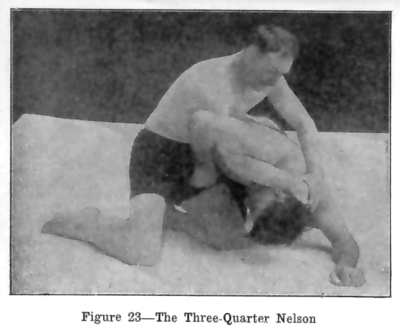
Power half nelson

The half nelson is referred to by most coaches as being the easiest pinning hold in folkstyle wrestling, and is very commonly used. The half nelson is done using only one hand, by passing it under the arm of the opponent and locking the hand on the opponent's neck. In addition, the hand not being used should be holding the opponent's other wrist so that they cannot post the hand or peel the half nelson off.

A power half nelson is a type of half nelson wherein the hand not performing the nelson is placed on the opponent's head to increase the overall power of the half nelson.

When the half nelson has been put into place, it is used to turn the opponent over onto their back. This is accomplished by using the hand to press the opponent's neck down, while using the arm under the opponent's shoulder to lift the shoulder and drive it perpendicularly to the opponent's body.

When the opponent has been turned over onto their back, the aggressor attempts to pin them by tightening the grip on the neck, putting the nelson in more deeply so that the aggressor's elbow is hooking the opponent's neck. Often the aggressor remains perpendicular to the opponent, chest on chest. The aggressor's free hand is used to minimize struggling by hooking the opponent's near or far leg or crotch.

==== Countering the half nelson ====
When the aggressor is in the process of putting the half nelson in, the opponent can attempt to prevent it from going in deeply by using their affected arm to clamp down on the intruding arm. This is especially effective if the opponent is on their knees instead of lying flat, which is why the half nelson should not be attempted until the opponent's stomach is on the ground. (However, there are types of half nelsons that can be applied when the opponents are on their knees. The Mills ride and the spiral-half are such techniques. With these techniques, the aggressor uses forward pressure to lift and drag the opponent across the aggressor's own hips. This movement relieves the clamp or "wing" pressure, creates a dominant perpendicular angle, lifts the opponents's near shoulder, and turns the opponent's hips.) When the aggressor's half is sufficiently clamped, the opponent can with the free hand reach under their own neck and "peel" off the half hand. (However, if the opponent attempts to peel the half with the near-side hand, it will lift the should being attacked and give the aggressor a more dominant angle to successfully run the half.)

When the aggressor is driving forward perpendicularly to the opponent's body, the opponent can try to avoid being flipped over onto their back by extending their opposite foot in the direction of the undesired movement, and planting it. Once planted, the opponent can use the pressure created by the resistance to drive themselves to their feet.

Once the opponent is on their back, they can attempt to avoid having their shoulders pinned to the mat, and to get off their back, by planting their feet and pushing the mat with them, allowing them to roll their head back so the top of their head is on the mat, rather than the back of their neck being on the aggressor's arm. From this position they can try to turn over, either toward or away from the aggressor.

=== Three-quarter nelson ===
The three-quarter nelson is done by performing a half nelson using one hand and passing the other hand underneath the opponent from the same side. The passing hand goes under the opponent's neck and around the far side to the top of the neck, where it is locked with the other hand around the neck at the wrist or using a palm-to-palm or interlacing fingers grip. The three-quarter nelson can be used in amateur wrestling to pin the opponent and is more secure than a half-nelson.

=== Full nelson ===
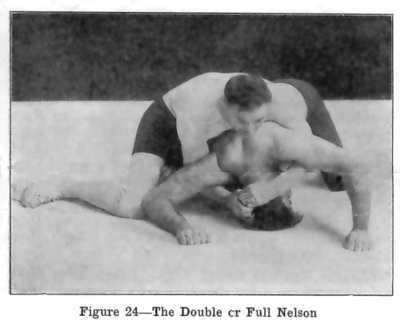
Full nelson

The full nelson (sometimes called a double nelson or a double shoulder lock) is done by performing half nelsons with both arms. In collegiate, high school, middle school or junior high school, and most other forms of amateur wrestling, the move is illegal due to possibility of injury. The holder is on the back side of the opponent, and has their hands extended upwards under the opponents armpits, holding the neck with a palm-to-palm grip or with interlaced fingers. By cranking the hands forward, pressure can be applied to the neck of the opponent. The usage of the full nelson in combat sports is very limited. It is a secure hold which can be used to control the opponent, but does not allow for finishing action, such as pinning the opponent, executing a reliable submission hold, or allowing for effective striking. Because it can be used as a limited neck crank, it is considered dangerous in some grappling arts, and is banned, for instance, in amateur wrestling. Catch wrestling allows the full nelson and generally uses it as an immobilization technique and form of neck crank submission. It has been a staple in professional wrestling from its early legitimately competitive days to current time. Ruffy Silverstein popularised the move during professional wrestling's early television exposure. A variation called the swinging full nelson in which one swings the opponent as they are held in the move has been a staple of many strength-based wrestlers in the modern era.
