= Billy Robinson =

English wrestler and coach (1938–2014)

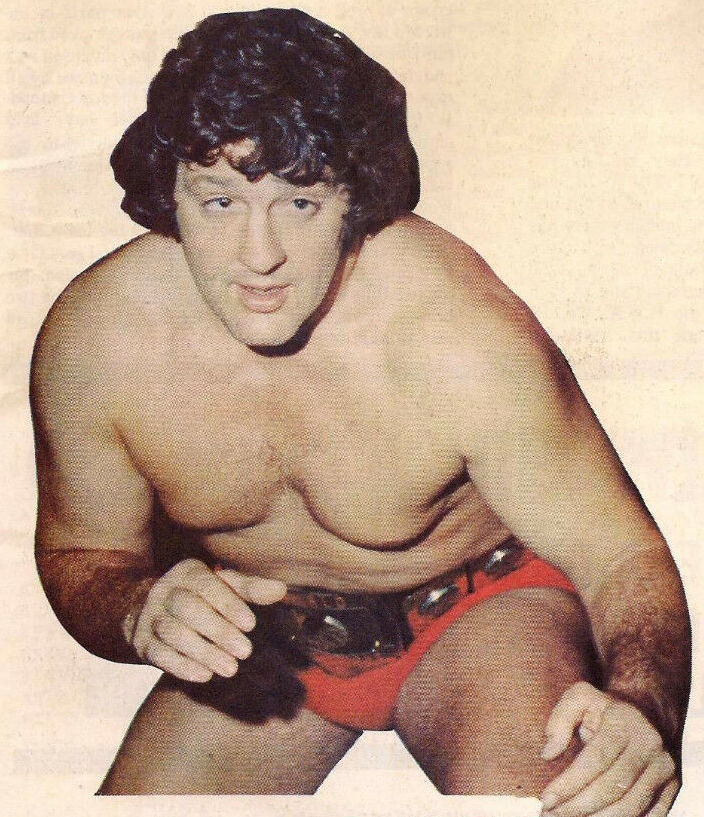
- Robinson in 1976

Personal information
- Born: William Alfred Robinson; 18 September 1938 Manchester, Lancashire, England
- Died: 27 February 2014 (aged 75) Little Rock, Arkansas, U.S.

Professional wrestling career
- Ring name: Billy Robinson
- Billed height: 5 ft 11 in (1.80 m)
- Billed weight: 240 lb (110 kg; 17 st)
- Trained by: Billy Riley; Billy Joyce
- Debut: 1958
- Retired: May 8, 1992
- Sports career
Medal record
Men's freestyle wrestling
Representing England
British Senior Championships
Gold medal – first place	1957	Light-heavyweight

William Alfred Robinson (18 September 1938 – 27 February 2014) was an English professional wrestler, amateur wrestler, catch wrestler, and wrestling coach. Having trained at Billy Riley's gym, better known as "The Snake Pit" in Wigan, Robinson was one of the leading practitioners of catch wrestling, a British national champion in freestyle wrestling, and a professional wrestling world champion. He had a successful career in the UK and internationally, especially in Japan.

Robinson is known for training professional wrestlers and mixed martial artists in the catch wrestling style, including Josh Barnett, Kazushi Sakuraba, Kiyoshi Tamura, and Shayna Baszler. His favourite saying as a coach was "do it again", which came from his trainer Billy Riley. He acted in several movies, including The Wrestler, and inspired the Kinnikuman character Robin Mask.

== Early life ==
Robinson was born in Manchester on September 18, 1938 to William James and Frances Hester (nee Exley). The men in the family were boxers and he started between four and five years of age. He also worked in his family's grocery store, where an eye injury between eleven and twelve years of age required hospitalization for five months and disqualified him from ever getting a boxing licence.

Robinson began amateur wrestling at fourteen. After a year, his father introduced him to Billy Riley, a reputed catch wrestling trainer who ran a gym in Wigan. Riley's Gym (later dubbed "The Snake Pit") was one of the most famed catch wrestling training schools in the world, had a rough training environment and produced wrestlers such as Karl Gotch, Bert Assirati, Jack Dempsey, and Billy Joyce. At the 1957 British Senior Championships, he won the freestyle wrestling light heavyweight title.

It has often been repeated that Robinson was also a "European Open Champion in the light heavyweight class, beating an Olympic bronze medal winner in the finals" in 1958, without stating who the medallist was. However, FILA did not hold the European Wrestling Championships between 1949 and 1966, and despite records going back to the first "unofficial European Championships" in 1898, United World Wrestling (FILA's successor) has no records of a "European Open Championship" taking place or anyone with Robinson's name competing for Britain, England, or any other nation.

== Professional wrestling career ==
=== Early days in Europe (1958–1970, 1978) ===
As a professional wrestler, Robinson became a double-crown British and European Heavyweight Champion for Joint Promotions. In 1963, he wrestled in a match at the Royal Albert Hall that was attended by Prince Philip. He defeated fellow Riley's wrestler and mentor Billy Joyce for the European title on 12 June 1965 and then beat Joyce again for the British title on 18 January 1967, vacating both titles in 1970 when he went off to America. He also had a high-profile feud with masked wrestler Kendo Nagasaki.

In 1978, Robinson made a brief homecoming tour of the UK including a televised win over Lee Bronson.

=== North America (1969–1988) ===
Robinson travelled to North America in 1969 for Stu Hart's Stampede Wrestling where he defeated Archie "The Stomper" Gouldie to earn a title shot at NWA World Heavyweight champion Dory Funk Jr. Soon afterwards, he began wrestling for Verne Gagne's American Wrestling Association. He was one of the most successful wrestlers of the American promotion known for hiring the "Real Deals" in wrestling. He was a three-time AWA British Empire Heavyweight Champion, reigning and defending in the United States and Canada. On 12 October 1974, his reputation as a legitimate wrestler landed him a role in the film The Wrestler alongside Verne Gagne and Ed Asner. He wrestled in Montreal in 1982 and 1983 becoming the International Champion beating Dino Bravo and was also International Tag Team champions with Pierre Mad Dog Lefebvre. He wrestled to a 60-minutes time-limit draw against then WWF Champion Bob Backlund in 1982 as well in Montreal. Robinson continued working for American Wrestling Association until retiring in 1988.

=== Japan (1968–1992) ===
Robinson travelled to Japan where he became popular as a wrestler versed in submission holds. He had a series of matches with Canadian George Gordienko. The pair had a notable match in 1968 as part of a "world championship tournament" where the pair wrestled to a draw in Sapporo. He participated in a professional wrestling match against Antonio Inoki in 1975. The match was billed as "The Match Between the World's Top Two Technicians" by the Japanese press. Japanese professional wrestlers learned the art of "hooking" and "shooting" from other catch wrestling icons including Karl Gotch and Lou Thesz. The new movement led to the formation of the Universal Wrestling Federation. The UWF wrestlers like Yoshiaki Fujiwara had also been to the Snake Pit in Wigan. In his last match, he advanced the shoot-style movement when he worked for the Union of Wrestling Forces International against fellow AWA champion Nick Bockwinkel on 8 May 1992.

=== Retirement ===
Robinson, having previously trained wrestlers in England including Marty Jones and Johnny Saint, began training wrestlers in catch wrestling at the UWF Snake Pit Japan, including James Maritato, Kazushi Sakuraba and El Signo. He also managed a convenience store and was a security guard at the Gold Coast Hotel and Casino for a time. He moved to Little Rock, Arkansas in 2001 to be closer to his son's family. His autobiography, Physical Chess: My Life in Catch-as-Catch-Can Wrestling, was published in June 2012. He continued to coach catch wrestling into his final years, in his adopted home of Arkansas along with seminars in the United States, Japan, Britain, and Canada.

== Death ==
Robinson died in his sleep on February 27, 2014, at the age of 75.

== Notable students ==
- Bob Bruggers
- Brad Rheingans
- Buddy Rose
- El Signo
- Erik Paulson
- Gary Albright
- Gentleman Jack Gallagher
- Davey Boy Smith Jr.
- Hideki Suzuki
- Nunzio
- Johnny Saint
- Josh Barnett
- Kazushi Sakuraba
- Kiyoshi Tamura
- Marty Jones
- Ric Flair
- Rusher Kimura
- Shayna Baszler
- Shigeo Miyato
- The Iron Sheik

== Championships and accomplishments ==
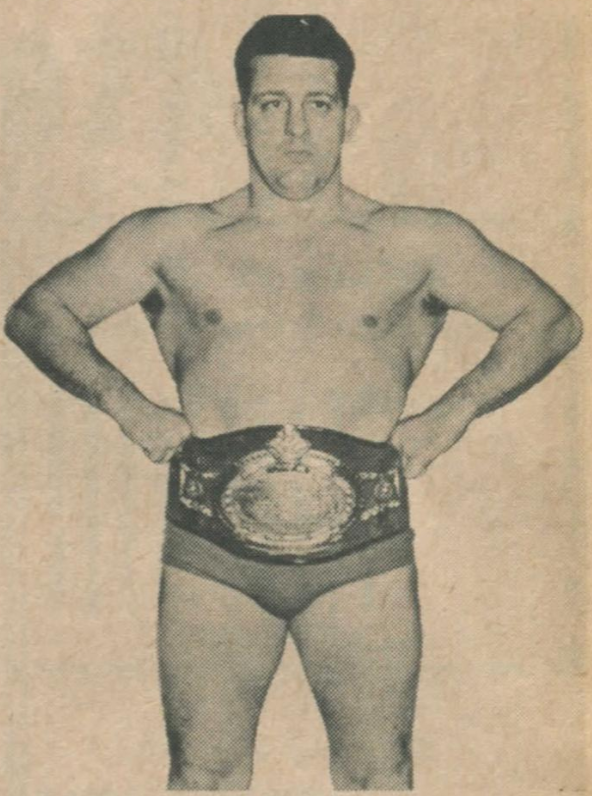
Robinson (pictured c. 1973 as the IWA World Heavyweight Champion) held multiple championships over the course of his career.

=== Freestyle wrestling ===
- British Wrestling Association
  - 1957 British Senior Championships - 1st place, light heavyweight

=== Professional wrestling ===
- All Japan Pro Wrestling
  - NWA United National Championship (1 time)
  - PWF World Heavyweight Championship (1 time)
  - 2 January Korakuen Hall Heavyweight Battle Royal (1980)
  - World's Strongest Tag Determination League Technique Award (1978) - with Wild Angus
  - World's Strongest Tag Determination League Technique Award (1980) - with Les Thornton
- American Wrestling Association
  - AWA British Empire Heavyweight Championship (3 times)
  - AWA World Tag Team Championship (2 times) - with Verne Gagne (1) and Crusher Lisowski (1)
- Cauliflower Alley Club
  - Other honoree (1994)
- Championship Wrestling from Florida
  - NWA Southern Heavyweight Championship (Florida version) (1 time)
- Continental Wrestling Association
  - CWA World Heavyweight Championship (3 times)
- George Tragos/Lou Thesz Professional Wrestling Hall of Fame
  - Class of 2002
- International Wrestling Enterprise
  - IWA World Heavyweight Championship (2 times)
  - IWE World Series (1968)
  - IWE World Series (1970)
- International Professional Wrestling Hall of Fame
  - Class of 2022
- Joint Promotions
  - British Heavyweight Championship (1 time)
  - European Heavyweight Championship (1 time)
- Lutte Internationale
  - Canadian International Heavyweight Championship (2 times)
  - Canadian International Tag Team Championship (1 time) - with Pierre Lefebvre
- New Japan Pro-Wrestling
  - Greatest 18 Club inductee
- Professional Wrestling Hall of Fame and Museum
  - Class of 2011
- Pro Wrestling Illustrated
  - PWI Most Popular Wrestler of the Year (1974)
  - Ranked No. 151 of the top 500 singles wrestlers of the "PWI Years" in 2003
- Stampede Wrestling
  - Stampede Wrestling Hall of Fame (Class of 1995)
- Tokyo Sports
  - Match of the Year Award (1975) vs. Antonio Inoki on 11 December
- World Championship Wrestling (Australia)
  - IWA World Heavyweight Championship (1 time)
- Wrestling Observer Newsletter
  - Wrestling Observer Newsletter Hall of Fame (Class of 1996)
