= Amnesty International UK Media Awards 1992 =

The inaugural awards took place in 1992. There were five categories Local Journalism, Periodicals, Print Journalism, Radio and Television.

Sir Trevor McDonald, TV broadcaster and journalist, said at the awards "Amnesty persists where journalism leaves off. We visit these scenes and then move on. Amnesty has the virtue of sticking with the story and making sure the truth comes out,"

The Overall winner was “Cold Blood - the Massacre of East Timor”, produced by Peter Gordon for First Tuesday, Yorkshire Television.

The judges also specially mentioned the work of Christopher Olgiati, “The Nightrider” (HBO title "Southern Justice: The Murder of Medgar Evers ").

== 1992 Awards ==
1992
Category	Title	Organisation	Journalists	Refs
Local Journalism
Local Journalism	Series of reports from Yugoslavia	Yorkshire Post	Robert Holmes	
Periodicals
Periodicals	“Why Rio is Murdering its Children”	Marie Claire	Christina Lamb	
Print Journalism
Print Journalism	“The Other Side of the Hostage Saga”	The Independent on Sunday	Robert Fisk	
Radio
Radio	“Suspected Collaborators in Kuwait”	Today (BBC Radio 4)	Alan Little	
Television Journalism
Television Journalism	Cold Blood - "the massacre of East Timor"	Yorkshire Television	Peter Gordon	
