= Jack Dempsey (wrestler) =

British professional wrestler

Personal information
- Born: Thomas Moore c. 1920 Newtown, England
- Died: 1 November 2007 (aged 87) Poolstock, England

Professional wrestling career
- Ring name: Jack Dempsey
- Billed height: 6 ft 3 in (1.91 m)
- Billed weight: 205 lb (93 kg)
- Trained by: Billy Riley
- Debut: 1937
- Retired: 1966

Thomas Moore (1920 – November 2007) was a British professional wrestler, best known by his ring name Jack Dempsey, who was active in North American and European regional promotions from the 1930s to the 1960s.

At the time of his 1966 retirement, he was a quadruple-crown British, European, Commonwealth and World (European version) Welterweight Champion.

One of the leading British welterweight champions during the 1960s, he faced many top stars of the era including George Kidd, Joe Murphy, John Foley, Eddie Capelli, Bob Steele, Alan Colbeck and, most notably, Mick McManus whom he defeated for the British Welterweight Championship in 1958.

== Career ==
Born in Newtown, England, Moore grew up in Wigan and, at age 11, began amateur boxing and later became involved in rugby league as a member of the Bradford Northern club, taking part in the first competition for the Ken Gee Cup. As a teenager, he worked as a coal miner while training at the famous Riley's Gym in Scholes. Taking part in several amateur wrestling bouts, he eventually made his professional debut in 1937 with the 17-year-old Moore losing to Al Jenkins.

Adopting his grandmother's surname, he began wrestling under the name Jack Dempsey and gained a large following while wrestling for promoter Billy Riley during the next several years. By the 1950s, he had begun pursuing the British Welterweight Championship held by Tony Lawrence and eventually defeated him for the title in 1953. Dempsey would defend his title for over three years before losing to Mick McManus in London, England on 5 January 1957. Feuding with McManus over the next year, he would regain the Welterweight Championship in one of the most anticipated matches of the era defeating McManus in London on 23 April 1958.

In 1954 he won the British Empire Welterweight Championship and still held the title (by then renamed the Commonwealth Welterweight Championship) at the time of his 1966 retirement. The title has never been filled since, leaving Dempsey as the only ever holder. When he later won the World Welterweight Championship, Dempsey was described by one sports writer as "The perfect ruthless fighting machine".

Although publicly criticizing the changing business of professional wrestling, stating his personal dislike for "clowns, gimmicks and showmen" in a magazine interview with The Wrestler in March 1963, he would feud with many such wrestlers such as Vic Faulkner, Jon Cortez and "Mr. TV" Jackie Pallo as national televised wrestling matches became more frequent during the 1960s.

He would remain Welterweight champion for eight years until vacating the title due to illness in October 1966. Upon doctors orders, he eventually retired from active competition so as to work with his wife Theresa in their Vine Street store in Whelley and later worked at Gullicks in Wigan. During the 1970s, he became an instructor at Riley's gym along with Billy Riley's son Ernie and head trainer Roy Wood. He later appeared in a 1989 ITV documentary on the gym, First Tuesday - The Wigan Hold, which eventually prompted government funding to move the gym to a location with modern facilities several miles from the original gym. In the years following his retirement, "Tommy" Moore became known as a popular local character often seen wearing a trademark bow tie and beret as well as smoking a King Edward cigar, often telling stories of his wrestling days in local pubs.

Spending his last years in Westwood Lodge Nursing Home in Poolstock, he died in November 2007 at age 87. His funeral held at St Mary's Roman Catholic Church in Standishgate, he was later buried in Gidlow Cemetery on 26 November.

== Championships and accomplishments ==
- Joint Promotions

- British Welterweight Championship (2 times)
- British Lightweight Championship (1 time)
- European Welterweight Championship (5 times)
- European Lightweight Championship (1 time)
- British Empire/Commonwealth Welterweight Champion (1 time - 1954-1966 - only ever holder)
- World Welterweight Champion (Mountevans Rules version)
