= Network First =

British television documentary series

Network First is a wide-ranging documentary strand broadcast on ITV in the U.K. from 4 January 1994 to 20 November 1997, and was a part replacement for First Tuesday and the Central produced Viewpoint strand.

Unlike other documentary series on ITV such as World in Action, Network First, was not centred on current affairs or politics, but broadcast a range of one-off programmes covering various subjects such as biography, history, and science. Programmes were usually transmitted in the 22:40 slot after News at Ten, each usually running for an hour. The strand was not "owned" by any one ITV franchise, and individual programmes were contributed by the various ITV companies.

As a strand, Network First never became a household "name" - unlike the likes of World in Action or This Week - possibly because of its diverse subject matter. The series appears to have been dropped quietly by ITV in the lead up to the high-profile axing of both World in Action on 7 December 1998 and News at Ten on 5 March 1999.
