= Newtown, Chester =

Coordinates: 53.2°N 2.883333°W

Newtown
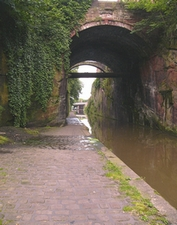
- Shropshire Union Canal

- Location within Cheshire
- OS grid reference: SJ408826
- Unitary authority: Cheshire West and Chester
- Ceremonial county: Cheshire
- Region: North West
- Country: England
- Sovereign state: United Kingdom
- Post town: CHESTER
- Postcode district: CH1
- Dialling code: 01244
- Police: Cheshire
- Fire: Cheshire
- Ambulance: North West
- UK Parliament: Chester North and Neston

Newtown is an area of Chester, in the unitary authority of Cheshire West and Chester and the ceremonial county of Cheshire, England.

== History ==
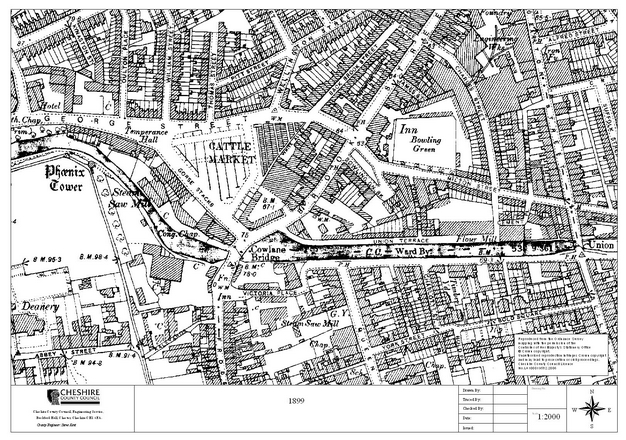
1899 Ordnance Survey map of N.E. Chester showing Newtown. The Cathedral grounds of St. Werburgh can be seen to bottom left of the map. The Phoenix Tower (The King Charles Tower) forms part of the Roman Walls of Chester.

Newtown is an area of north-east Chester, just outside the city walls and to the east of Chester Cathedral and the Phoenix Tower. The main layout of streets originated in the late 1790s because of the location by the cattle market and along the Shropshire Union Canal.

Newtown, together with Boughton and Hoole, provided most of the workers to Chester during the Industrial Revolution of the late 18th century, leading to substantial wealth for the city.

Newtown's growth and importance to the Chester economy was driven from about 1793 by its location in the canal network, and from the 1840s by its location in the railway network, close to the two Chester railway stations: Chester General and Chester Northgate. The area supported a thriving community of artisans and working-class families who lived mainly in "two-up-two-down" terraced housing with no bathroom and an outside toilet. The last canal-side flour mill closed in the late 1950s.

Because of its location in the canal and railway networks, Newtown in Chester, along with Liverpool and Manchester, became a hub of northern English commerce. The canal was the 'motorway' of its day and narrowboats carried produce and supplies to and from North Wales (coal, slate, gypsum and lead ore). Finished lead (for roofing, water pipes and sewerage), produced in the huge leadworks in Egerton Street Newtown, was exported all over the country. Grain from the Cheshire farmlands was processed in the large mills and granaries on the banks of the canal at Newtown and Boughton; and salt (for preserving food such as fish and meat) came from Northwich.

== Present day ==
Newtownsaints tower blocks

The two large estates, run by Chester & District Housing Trust, referred to as 'The Saints' Area' and 'Francis Street Flats', are a mixture of sheltered accommodation and normal family occupancy. The 'saints' area has three large 1960s-built tower blocks (St Annes, St Oswalds and St Georges), along with many low-rise houses and maisonettes. On the opposite side of Hoole Way there are a further three tower blocks, namely, Heygarth Heights, Thackery Towers and Rowlands Heights, all built in the 1970s. These properties were built on an area which used to contain the old 'back-to-back' terraced houses; housing workers from the two railway stations, the Royal Mail depot and the old Chester Cattle Market.

Hoole Way virtually dissects the 'old' Newtown in half, and runs almost exactly along the route of what was Back Brook Street. There are still some surviving buildings which used to form part of the bottom end of the street (the top end being the Cattle Market end) - notably, number 24 Back Brook Street. In addition, the backs of the old vegetable and butchers shops can still be seen.

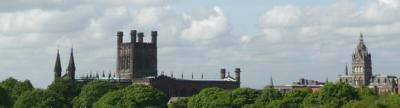
Picture above shows Chester City Cathedral and Chester Town Hall, as seen from the Newtown tower blocks in Francis Street.

Brook Street is a local shopping area with shops, pubs and restaurants. The street used to be the main route into Chester from the north, leading to the railway station and Francis Street, another area of Newtown. Francis Street has three further 1970's-built high-rise tower blocks and more Chester & District Housing Trust social housing along with private housing. The Newtown area also contains a small 'arts' cinema.

== Governance ==
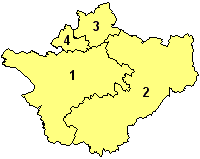
City of Chester and West Cheshire shown as 1 on this map of Cheshire

Newtown forms part of an unparished area within the city of Chester. Administratively, the area is part of the unitary authority of Cheshire West and Chester in the ceremonial county of Cheshire. Cheshire West and Chester came into force in April 2009, when the Local Government and Public Involvement in Health Act was enacted, and replaced the boroughs of Ellesmere Port and Neston, Vale Royal and Chester District. The equivalent unitary authority in the other half of the county is called Cheshire East. The decision to create the Cheshire West and Chester unitary authority was announced on 25 July 2007 following a consultation period, in which a proposal to create a single Cheshire unitary authority was rejected.

The area was within the City of Chester parliamentary constituency before the split of the constituency. It is currently in Chester North and Neston
