= Catch wrestling =

Hybrid wrestling style

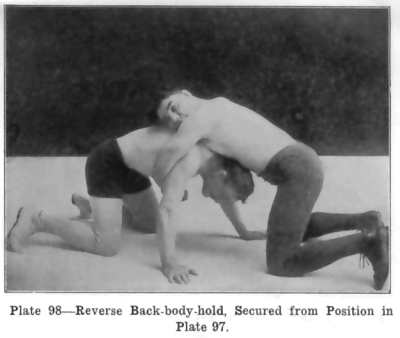
- Also known as: Catch-as-catch-can (CACC); Lancashire wrestling Loose-hold; Hooking; Rough and tumble Fair fight
- Focus: Wrestling, Submission Grappling
- Country of origin: United Kingdom
- Famous practitioners: (see notable practitioners)
- Parenthood: English wrestling (primarily Lancashire style, with influence from Cumberland, Westmorland, Cornish, Devonshire wrestling), Irish collar-and-elbow
- Descendant arts: Freestyle wrestling, professional wrestling, shoot wrestling, Brazilian jiu-jitsu, folkstyle wrestling, Luta Livre, Sambo, Shooto, mixed martial arts, Collegiate wrestling
- Olympic sport: Yes (as amateur freestyle wrestling) since 1904

Catch wrestling (also known as catch-as-catch-can) is an English wrestling style with fewer restrictions than other wrestling styles. It allows techniques using or targeting the legs (unlike Greco-Roman wrestling), it allows joint locks (unlike freestyle wrestling and Greco-Roman wrestling), and it does not require a prescribed starting grip. Rules varied by period, promoter, and competition. It was spread by wrestlers of travelling funfairs who developed their own submission holds, referred to as "hooks" and "stretches", into their wrestling to increase their effectiveness against their opponents, as well as immigrants through Europe and the Anglosphere.

Catch-as-catch-can was included in the 1904 Olympic Games and continued through the 1936 Games; it had new rules and weight categories introduced similar to other amateur wrestling styles, and dangerous moves – including all submission holds – were banned. International and national amateur wrestling organizations increasingly standardized catch-as-catch-can rules, eliminating submissions and other dangerous techniques. The International Amateur Wrestling Federation (IAWF), founded in 1921, (Note: Later known as Fédération Internationale des Luttes Associées (FILA) and currently as United World Wrestling (UWW)) adopted a modified ruleset that became known as freestyle wrestling. Thus, catch declined as a distinct competitive style, while aspects of its techniques and traditions were preserved in professional wrestling, particularly in Japan, where it became associated with the development of strong-style and Shoot-style Puroresu. After a revival effort starting in the 1980s, competitive catch wrestling gradually made a return, leading to The Snake Pit's Catch Wrestling World Championships and notable competitions such as the Snake Pit British Championships and ACWA US Open.

Professional wrestling, although not today a legitimate combat sport, originated as competitive catch wrestling. The original and historic World Heavyweight Wrestling Championship was created in 1905 to identify the best catch-as-catch-can wrestler in the world, before the belt was retired in 1957 and unified with the NWA World Heavyweight Championship. Modern day professional wrestling has its origins in wrestling matches where predetermined ("worked") matches had elements of performing arts introduced (as well as striking and acrobatic manoeuvres), turning it into an entertainment spectacle. In a few countries, such as in France, Spain, Austria and Germany, "catch" or its variants (such as German Catchen) have been used to refer to professional wrestling, while in Brazil the term Telecatch (a portmanteau of television and catch) is occasionally used, borrowed from a popular professional wrestling television show from the 1970s.

In the UK, catch wrestling combines several British styles of wrestling (primarily Lancashire, as well as Cumberland, Westmorland, Devonshire and Cornish) along with influences from the Irish collar-and-elbow and Indian pehlwani styles of wrestling. The training of many modern submission wrestlers, professional wrestlers, and mixed martial artists is founded in catch wrestling through its various descendant styles. Martial arts that have roots in and/or was heavily influenced by catch wrestling include American folkstyle wrestling, Brazilian Luta Livre, and Japanese shoot-style wrestling and shootfighting. Catch wrestling has also directly or indirectly influenced the developments of Sambo, Brazilian jiu-jitsu and MMA.

== History ==
=== Origins in Britain, spread and evolution ===
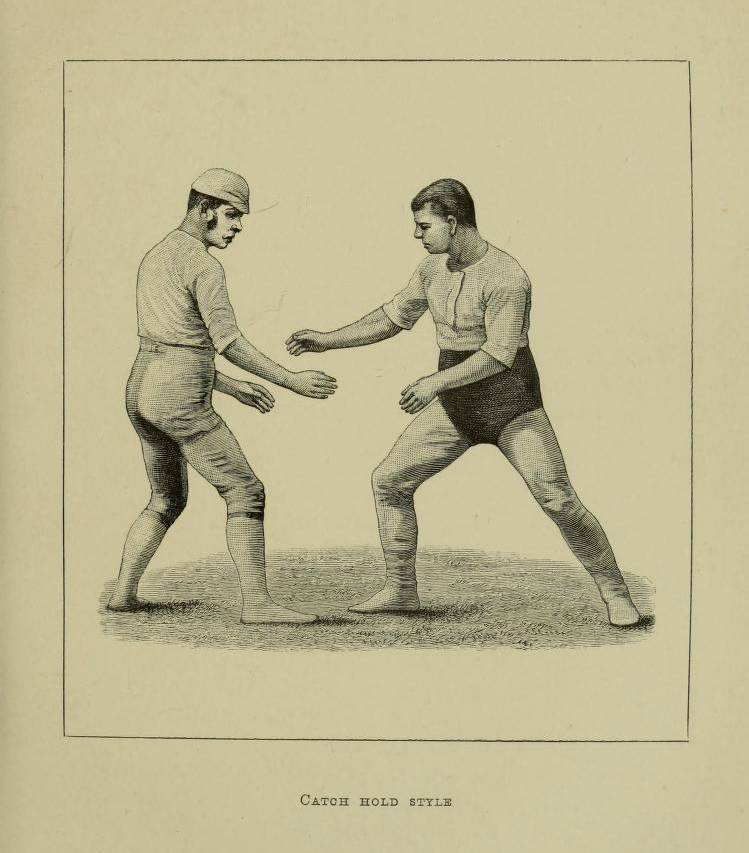
Catch wrestling start position, from an 1889 illustration

Catch wrestling in Britain was predominantly based on Lancashire wrestling, spreading across Britain and internationally. By 1840 the phrase "catch as catch can" was being used in America to describe their rough and tumble fighting found in the frontier which was characterized by its lack of strict rules and the use of any and all tactics to achieve victory.

The phrase "catch as catch can" reflected the improvisational nature of the style, where wrestlers utilized whatever holds they could "catch" on their opponent with the primary goal being to make the opponent verbally quit by using grappling techniques including holds and dirty moves associated with the American style at the time.

Various promoters of the exercise, notably J. Wannop, of New Cross, attempted to bring the new system prominently before the public, with the view of amalgamating the three English styles viz. the Cumberland and Westmorland, Cornwall and Devon, and Lancashire. The sudden development of the Cumberland and Westmorland Amateur Wrestling Society brought the new style prominently to the front, and special prizes were given for competition in that class at the society's first annual midsummer gathering at the Paddington Recreation Ground, which was attended by Lord Mayor Whitehead and sheriffs in state.

Wrestling on the "catch-as-catch-can" principle was new to many spectators, but it was generally approved of as a great step in advance of the loose-hold system, which includes struggling on the ground and sundry objectionable tactics, such as catching hold of the legs, twisting arms, dislocating fingers, and other items of attack and defence peculiar to Lancashire wrestling.

When catch wrestling reached the United States in the late 19th and early 20th centuries it became extremely popular with the wrestlers of the carnivals. The carnivals' wrestlers challenged the locals as part of the carnival's "athletic show" and the locals had their chance to win a cash reward if they could defeat the carnival's strongman by a pin or a submission. Eventually, the carnivals' wrestlers began preparing for the worst kind of unarmed assault and aiming to end the wrestling match with any tough local quickly and decisively via submission. A hook was a technical submission which could end a match within seconds. As carnival wrestlers travelled, they met with a variety of people, learning and using techniques from various other folk wrestling disciplines, especially Irish collar-and-elbow, many of which were accessible due to a huge influx of immigrants in the United States during this era.

This is also the origin of professional wrestling, which initially consisted of legitimate competitive wrestling rather than predetermined entertainment. During the late 19th and early 20th centuries, professional wrestlers competed against one another under various rulesets, with catch wrestling becoming particularly influential alongside established styles such as Greco-Roman wrestling, as well as local and folk styles of wrestling. Matches could be won by pinfall or submission, and wrestlers traveled between towns, carnivals, and sporting venues to compete against other professionals and local challengers. Successful wrestlers built reputations through their actual competitive abilities, with major contests attracting large audiences and significant financial rewards. The professionalization of these competitions was also reflected in the emergence of championship titles intended to recognize leading wrestlers in particular styles. These included the American Heavyweight Championship and the World Greco-Roman Heavyweight Championship, with the latter's title history encompassing both world and European championship designations. In 1905, the World Heavyweight Wrestling Championship was established to recognize the world's leading catch-as-catch-can wrestler and unified the latter two titles; its early champions included George Hackenschmidt and Frank Gotch, whose championship contests were treated as major legitimate wrestling competitions.

Catch wrestling contests also became immensely popular in Europe involving the likes of the Indian heavyweight champion Great Gama, Imam Baksh Pahalwan, Gulam, Bulgarian heavyweight champion Dan Kolov, Swiss champion John Lemm, Americans Frank Gotch, Tom Jenkins, Ralph Parcaut, Ad Santel, Ed Lewis, Lou Thesz and Benjamin Roller, Mitsuyo Maeda from Japan (who is credited to having introduced Judo to the Gracie family), and Georg Hackenschmidt from the Russian Empire (modern-day Estonia).

In Brazil, Catch wrestling was introduced in the early 20th century and became known locally as Luta Livre Americana, contributing to the development of Luta Livre, a Brazilian submission grappling style developed by Euclydes "Tatu" Hatem in Rio de Janeiro. It also directly influenced the creation of Brazilian jiu-jitsu: Japanese judoka Mitsuyo Maeda competed in Western professional wrestling, where he learned catch wrestling, before teaching Carlos Gracie in Judo. In addition Carlos, George and Hélio Gracie cross-trained in catch wrestling under Orlando "Dudu" da Silva, a prominent Brazilian catch wrestler. Hélio subsequently incorporated elements from catch wrestling into the development of the Gracie family's jiu-jitsu. Catch wrestling also influenced the development of Sambo in the Soviet Union, where catch wrestling was known as "free wrestling" (Russian: вольная борьба; volnaya borba). During the formation of sambo in the 1920s and 1930s, its founders incorporated techniques from free wrestling alongside judo, traditional Soviet and Central Asian wrestling styles, and other grappling systems. This contributed to sambo's emphasis on takedowns, pins, and submission holds, including leg locks.

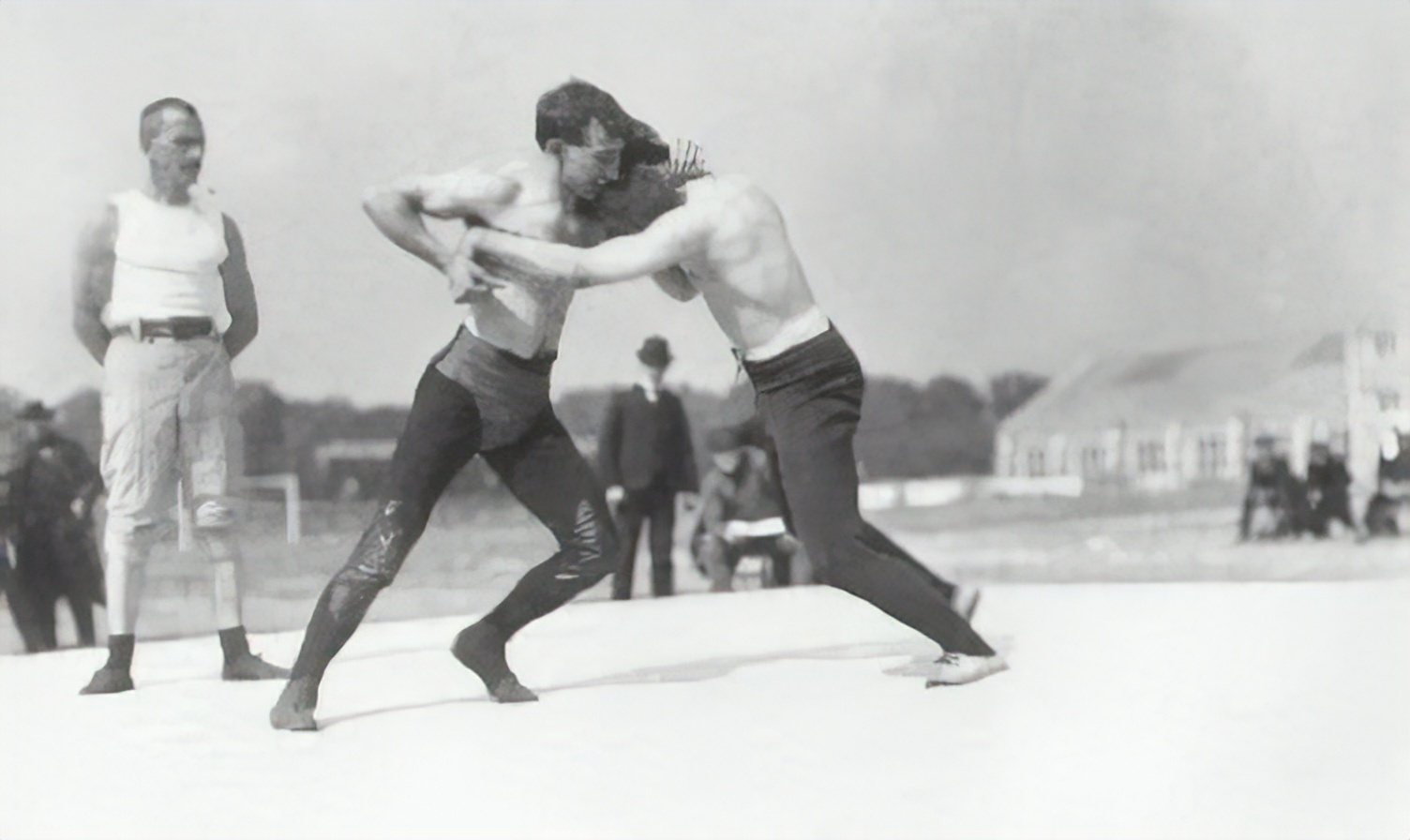
Catch (or freestyle retroactively) wrestling at the 1904 Summer Olympics

Wrestling made a return at the 1904 Summer Olympics in St. Louis, US, but different from previous editions, wrestling was disputed under catch-as-catch-can rules due to the popularity of this particular style in the United States. The competition doubled as the United States Amateur Athletic Union (AAU) wrestling championships, which introduced new rules: it was single elimination tournament, with bouts being six minutes in duration plus an extra three minutes for overtime; in the case that no pinfall was registered, a judge would render the final decision. Six weight classes were introduced and all submission holds were banned. The International Amateur Wrestling Federation (IAWF)—current United World Wrestling—was founded in 1921 in order to better organize Olympic wrestling. The IAWF set the "rules of the game" which regulated and codified a new ruleset derived from catch; the new name chosen was "freestyle wrestling", which appears to have been a translation of the French lutte libre, which itself is the French translation of catch-as-catch-can. The name was chosen to distance itself from catch wrestling, which had lost reputation due to the rise of professional wrestling. In 1922 the AAU followed suit and adopted the new freestyle rule-set, ending its official catch-as-catch-can championship era, which its own records date from 1888 through 1921.

=== Decline and transformation into professional wrestling ===
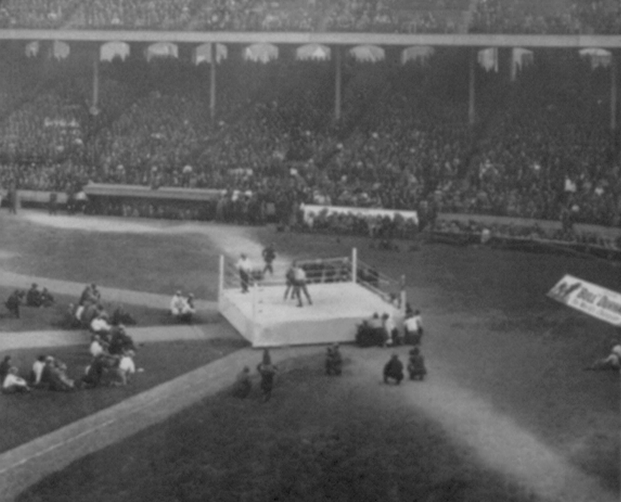
Match between Frank Gotch vs Georg Hackenschmidt for the World Heavyweight Wrestling Championship, 1911.

By the 1920s, professional wrestling had increasingly diverged from legitimate catch wrestling competition. As interest in professional matches started to wane due a combination of factors (such as slow pacing, overly long matches, a lack of dramatic action, among others), wrestlers began match fixing, initially manipulating the outcomes of ostensibly competitive contests and later choreographing some of their matches to make them less physically taxing, shorter in duration, with better flow and pacing, more entertaining—giving emphasis on readable and more impressive moves—and with bigger focus on the personal charisma of the wrestlers, with the introduction of "gimmicks" (in-ring personas) and dramatic storylines surrounding the matches, while maintaining "kayfabe", presenting the matches as legitimate contests. Meanwhile, most, most amateur competition adopted the Freestyle rules (or Folkstyle in some parts of the U.S., in particular on the school and collegiate systems), which were increasingly standardized and focused on points and positional control rather than submission holds.

The "Gold Dust Trio", formed by world heavyweight champion Ed "Strangler" Lewis, his manager Billy Sandow and his fellow wrestler Joseph "Toots" Mondt, are credited with pivoting professional wrestling into a more theatrical form of entertainment. The trio introduced what they called "Slam-Bang Western-style Wrestling", coreographed matches which drew on elements of catch-as-catch-can, Greco-Roman wrestling, and bare-knuckle boxing, emphasizing fast-paced action, spectacular maneuvers, predetermined outcomes and long-term storylines meant to build interest in future matches, rather than the slower, more methodical pace and technical grappling characteristic of legitimate wrestling competition, while pioneering a new business model where the trio would promote large shows around the country and maintain wrestlers under long-term contracts, promoting full cards instead of individual matches, leading to the success of the partnership. Although predetermined outcomes and worked matches had existed in professional wrestling before the Gold Dust Trio, they helped systematize the dramatic "finisher" and make storytelling and spectacle central elements of the product. Soon other promoters followed suit and the industry was fundamentally changed from grappling exhibitions into a form of sports entertainment. Mondt later became a partner of Vincent J. McMahon Sr. in operating the Capitol Wrestling Corporation (CWC), the predecessor of WWE.

Footage of a professional wrestling match between Athol Oakley (in white trunks) and Bulldog Bill Garnon at London's Sports Club, circa early 1930s.

Meanwhile, in Britain, a similar transition took place with the emergence of "All-in" wrestling during the 1930s. It combined the established British catch-as-catch-can tradition with the showmanship, spectacle and presentation increasingly associated with American professional wrestling, incorporating catch wrestling's holds, throws, takedowns and submission techniques into a more theatrical form of entertainment. Promoters and wrestlers adapted the existing competitive style of British catch wrestling to appeal to a mass audience, further blurring the distinction between genuine wrestling competition and professional entertainment. Although many early contests remained strongly grappling-oriented, the rapid expansion of the business created a demand for wrestlers and promoters increasingly turned toward more theatrical and violent forms of presentation, including the use of weapons, blood, and other spectacles. This eventually caused Professional "All-in" Wrestling to be banned in the late 1930s, after which promoters adopted the Admiral-Lord Mountevans rules in 1947, with a more more regulated and sport-oriented presentation.

With time, Professional Wrestling training gradually shifted away from the expectation that wrestlers should be primarily competitive catch wrestlers. The expansion of professional wrestling through television also accelerated this transformation. As wrestling became increasingly integrated into mass entertainment, matches were progressively adapted to the demands of broadcast programming, encouraging performers and promoters to prioritize entertainment value, audience engagement, and dramatic presentation over the appearance of genuine athletic competition. While legitimate wrestling remained an important technical foundation, performers increasingly trained to work predetermined matches, emphasizing timing, positioning, selling, showmanship, character work, and spectacular yet controlled maneuvers. The ability to convincingly perform a match ("selling") became more important than the ability to defeat an opponent in a genuine wrestling contest. This shift also gradually changed the physical appearance of professional wrestling: matches increasingly incorporated movements and sequences designed for dramatic effect rather than to resemble the most effective techniques of a competitive wrestling bout, and many maneuvers and techniques require cooperation between performers. Ttraditional catch wrestling gradually declined and largely disappeared from professional wrestling training, and as a result, it mostly ceased to exist as a major, distinct wrestling tradition in its original form, with many of its techniques and principles surviving instead within other wrestling and grappling systems. Professional wrestlers whose style retained a strong emphasis on legitimate grappling and catch wrestling techniques were sometimes described as "scientific wrestlers", "technicians", "shooters" or "hookers", the latter two terms referring more specifically to wrestlers with legitimate grappling ability and the capacity to apply their skills in an unscripted contest.

By the late 20th century, many styles of professional wrestling had developed a distinctly theatrical visual language that was very different from traditional catch-as-catch-can, in which wrestlers cooperated to execute elaborate sequences, dramatic reversals, high-impact maneuvers and storytelling. This development reached a new level in the 1980s professional wrestling boom with the national expansion of the World Wrestling Federation (WWF), which brought professional wrestling into mainstream popular culture and further established it as a form of sports entertainment. According to Jack Slack, elements of Catch wrestling techniques nevertheless remained embedded in professional wrestling, particularly in chain wrestling and submission holds, preserving elements of the older grappling style after professional wrestling had become predominantly predetermined entertainment.

=== Revival in Japan and influence on modern combat sports ===
From the 1960s onward, catch wrestling found a new foothold in Japan through British practitioners such as Karl Gotch and Billy Robinson. Gotch, a student of Wigan’s Snake Pit, while a talented technical, legitimate wrestler (having represented Belgium at the 1948 Summer Olympics) was poorly suited to an American professional-wrestling market increasingly emphasizing entertainment and showmanship, whereas Japan provided a receptive audience for his sport-oriented approach. He taught catch wrestling to a generation of Japanese professionals, including Antonio Inoki, Akira Maeda, Tatsumi Fujinami, Satoru Sayama and Yoshiaki Fujiwara, helping to establish the "strong-style" of Japanese professional wrestling, which sought to give matches the appearance and physicality of genuine combat, emphasized a more realistic and physically intense style of professional wrestling, incorporating legitimate grappling and submission techniques, stiffer strikes and throws, and influences from other martial arts. In the 1980s, this approach developed further through the Universal Wrestling Federation (UWF) and related shoot-style promotions, which went further as a simulated sport resembling a form of proto-MMA and deliberately minimized theatricality. Harkening back to the older tradition of professional wrestling rooted in catch-as-catch-can wrestling, shoot-style sought to present professional wrestling as a more credible form of combat, blurring the distinction between legitimate fighting and theatrical performance. Sayama left the original UWF and founded Shooto in 1985 as a legimitate competitive combat sport, combining catch wrestling with striking and other martial arts techniques, while in 1993, former UWF alumni Masakatsu Funaki and Minoru Suzuki founded Pancrase, with the aim of being "professional wrestling with real combat". Billy Robinson later continued the Wigan tradition as head coach of the UWF Snake Pit in Tokyo, helping preserve catch wrestling's submission-oriented techniques and passing them to another generation of Japanese wrestlers and fighters.

By the 1990s, these Japanese shoot-style and catch wrestling lineages became closely connected to the emerging sport of Mixed martial arts (MMA). Many Japanese shoot wrestlers transitioned to MMA bringing with them a blend of catch wrestling-based approach to grappling and striking techniques. In the United States, Ken Shamrock became one of the most prominent early MMA fighters associated with this tradition, having trained in the Japanese shoot-style environment and competed for Pancrase before becoming a major star in the UFC, while Josh Barnett, who trained under Billy Robinson at the UWF Snake Pit, became one of the most prominent modern practitioners of catch wrestling in MMA. In Japan, fighters such as Kazushi Sakuraba, who trained under Billy Robinson, demonstrated the effectiveness of catch wrestling-derived grappling against practitioners of other martial arts. This exposure to MMA helped revive interest in catch wrestling, as fighters and coaches increasingly looked to its submission techniques and grappling traditions as an alternative to more established systems such as Brazilian jiu-jitsu. The success of catch-influenced fighters such as Sakuraba and Barnett, alongside renewed interest in the teachings of Gotch and Robinson, contributed to the modern revival of catch wrestling. This revival led to renewed efforts to preserve and teach traditional catch wrestling, particularly through the Wigan Snake Pit lineage and organizations in Britain, the United States and elsewhere.

In modern times, professional wrestling is regarded as being, by definition, prearranged entertainment and is legally classed as such by legislatures such as New York (19 CRR-NY 213.2). It is nonetheless still feasible to hold catch wrestling competitions with all the rules and trappings of professional wrestling (roped elevated quadrilateral ring, submission and three count pinfall as equal goals, etc.). A rules system for such competition was devised by professional wrestling champion and catch wrestling coach Karl Gotch for fellow catch wrestler Jake Shannon's "King of Catch" tournaments and similar rules were employed for a 2018 tournament in memory of professional wrestling champion and catch wrestling coach Billy Robinson. Some professional wrestling promotions have also introduced rulesets emphasizing technical wrestling and submission strategy, characteristics historically associated with catch-as-catch-can wrestling. Ring of Honor (ROH), for example, introduced its Pure Wrestling rules in the early 2000s, limiting competitors to three rope breaks and prohibiting closed-fist strikes to the face, focusing on technical skill, submission holds and strategic grappling.

== Techniques ==
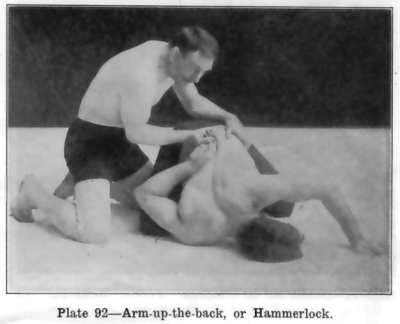
A hammerlock as demonstrated in Farmer Burns' correspondence course, 1913

The English term "catch as catch can" is generally understood to mean "catch (a hold) anywhere you can". As this implies, the rules of catch wrestling were more open than the earlier folk styles it was based on, as well as its French Greco-Roman counterpart, which did not allow holds below the waist. Catch wrestlers can win a match by either submission or pin, and most matches are contested as the best two of three falls, with a maximum length of an hour. Often, but not always, the chokehold was barred. Other fouls like fish-hooking and eye-gouging (which were called "rips" or "ripping") were always forbidden.

Pins were the predominant way to win, to the point some matches did not even include submissions as an additional way; submission holds (also called "punishment holds") were instead exclusively for control and to force the opponent into a pin under the threat of pain and injury. According to Tommy Heyes, student of Billy Riley, there are no registers of a single classical catch wrestler winning by submission. This is the reason why leglocks and neck cranks were emphasized as valid techniques, as while they are difficult to use as finishing moves without a good base, they can be used to force movement. Also, just as today "tapping out" signifies a concession as does shouting out "Uncle!", back in the heyday of catch wrestling rolling to one's back could also signify defeat, as it would mean a pin. Catch-as-catch-can toeholds typically only exert force if the opponent sits still; therefore, Frank Gotch won many matches by forcing his opponent to roll over onto their back with the threat of his signature toehold.

A "hook" can be defined as an undefined move that stretches, spreads, twists, or compresses any joint or limb. Therefore, another name for a catch wrestler was a "hooker", with the similar term "shooter" being relegated to specially skilled hookers.

Catch wrestling techniques may include, but are not limited to: the arm bar, Japanese arm bar, straight arm bar, hammerlock, bar hammerlock, wrist lock, top wrist lock, double wrist lock (this hold is also known as the Kimura in MMA, or the reverse Ude-Garami in judo), coil lock (this hold is also known as an Omoplata in MMA), head scissors, body scissors, chest lock, abdominal lock, abdominal stretch, leg lock, knee bar, ankle lock, heel hook, toe hold, half Nelson, and full Nelson.

The rules of catch wrestling would change from venue to venue. Matches contested with side-bets at the coal mines or logging camps favoured submission wins where there was absolutely no doubt as to who the winner was. Meanwhile, professionally booked matches and amateur contests favoured pins that catered to the broader and more gentle paying fan-base. The impact of catch wrestling on modern-day amateur wrestling is also well established. In the film Catch: The Hold Not Taken, US Olympic gold medallist Dan Gable talks of how when he learned to wrestle as an amateur the style was known locally, in Waterloo, Iowa, as catch-as-catch-can. The wrestling tradition of Iowa is rooted in catch wrestling as Farmer Burns and his student Frank Gotch are known as the grandfathers of wrestling in Iowa.

== Martial arts ==
=== Judo ===
A notable match in 1914 was between two prime representatives of their respective crafts: the German-American catch wrestler Ad Santel was the world light heavyweight champion in catch wrestling, while Tokugoro Ito, a fifth-degree black belt in judo, claimed to be the world judo champion. Santel defeated Ito and proclaimed himself world judo champion.

The response from Jigoro Kano's Kodokan was swift and came in the form of another challenger, fourth-degree black belt Daisuke Sakai. Santel, however, still defeated the Kodokan Judo representative. The Kodokan tried to stop the hooker by sending men like fifth-degree black belt Reijiro Nagata (whom Santel defeated by TKO). Santel also drew with fifth-degree black belt Hikoo Shoji. The challenge matches stopped after Santel gave up on the claim of being the world judo champion in 1921 in order to pursue a career in full-time professional wrestling. Although Tokugoro Ito avenged his loss to Santel with a choke, official Kodokan representatives proved unable to imitate Ito's success. Just as Ito was the only Japanese judoka to overcome Santel, Santel was the only Western catch-wrestler on record as having a win over Ito, who also regularly challenged other grappling styles.

=== Mixed martial arts ===
Karl Gotch was a catch wrestler and a student of Billy Riley's "Snake Pit" gym in Wigan, then in Lancashire. Gotch started to teach catch wrestling to Japanese professional wrestlers in the 1960s and continued to do so for many years. He first trained the likes of Antonio Inoki, Tatsumi Fujinami, Hiro Matsuda, Osamu Kido, then others including Satoru Sayama (Tiger Mask), Akira Maeda, and Yoshiaki Fujiwara. Starting from 1976, one of these professional wrestlers, Inoki, hosted a series of mixed martial arts bouts against the champions of other disciplines, including a legitimate mixed-rules match against boxer Muhammad Ali. This resulted in unprecedented popularity of the clash-of-styles bouts in Japan. His matches showcased catch wrestling moves like the sleeper hold, cross arm breaker, seated armbar, Indian deathlock and keylock.

Gotch's students formed the original Universal Wrestling Federation (Japan) in 1984 with Akira Maeda, Satoru Sayama, and Yoshiaki Fujiwara as the top grapplers showcasing shoot-style matches. The UWF movement was led by catch wrestlers and gave rise to the mixed martial arts boom in Japan. Wigan stand-out Billy Robinson soon thereafter began training MMA veteran Kazushi Sakuraba. Lou Thesz trained MMA veteran Kiyoshi Tamura. Catch wrestling forms the base of Japan's martial art of shoot wrestling. Japanese professional wrestling and a majority of the Japanese fighters from Pancrase, Shooto and the now defunct RINGS bear links to catch wrestling. Randy Couture, Kazushi Sakuraba, Masakatsu Funaki, Takanori Gomi, Shinya Aoki and Josh Barnett, among other mixed martial artists, study catch wrestling as their primary submission style.

The term "no holds barred" was used originally to describe the wrestling method prevalent in catch wrestling tournaments during the late 19th century wherein no wrestling holds were banned from the competition, regardless of how dangerous they might be. The term was later applied to mixed martial arts matches, especially at the advent of the Ultimate Fighting Championship.

== Notable practitioners ==
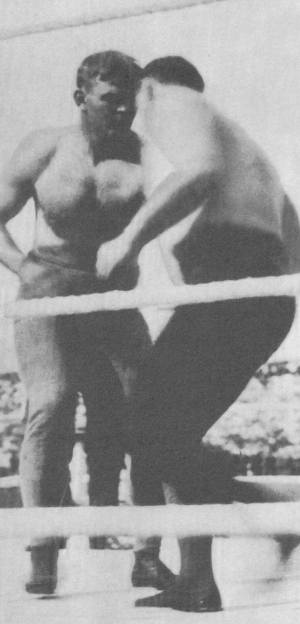
Professional match between Frank Gotch and George Hackenschmidt, 1911.

- Gene Anderson
- Shinya Aoki
- Bob Backlund
- Josh Barnett
- Shayna Baszler
- Farmer Burns
- Gokor Chivichyan
- Allen Coage
- Randy Couture
- Yoshiaki Fujiwara
- Masakatsu Funaki
- Masakazu Imanari
- Verne Gagne
- Jack Gallagher
- Frank Gotch
- Karl Gotch
- George Hackenschmidt
- Dennis Hallman
- Stu Hart
- Danny Hodge
- Antonio Inoki
- Demetrious Johnson
- Marty Jones
- Karol Kalmikoff
- Dan Koloff
- Gene LeBell
- Ed "Strangler" Lewis
- Evan Lewis
- Abraham Lincoln
- Neil Melanson
- Shigeo Miyato
- Erik Paulson
- John Pesek
- William Regal
- Billy Riley
- Billy Robinson
- Kazushi Sakuraba
- Ad Santel
- Frank Shamrock
- Ken Shamrock
- Dick Shikat
- Davey Boy Smith Jr.
- Joe Stecher
- Ray Steele
- Hideki Suzuki
- Minoru Suzuki
- Kiyoshi Tamura
- Lou Thesz
- Stanislaus Zbyszko
- Wladek Zbyszko

== See also ==
- Styles of wrestling
- Lucha libre
- Puroresu
