= First Tuesday (TV programme) =

- Also known as: This World
- Genre: Documentary
- Presented by: Jonathan Dimbleby, Olivia O'Leary, Jane Walmsley

Production
- Production company: Yorkshire Television

Original release
- Release: 5 April 1983 – 2 November 1993

Related
- Network First

First Tuesday is a monthly television documentary strand that was shown in the United Kingdom on the ITV network and produced by Yorkshire Television. The subject matter is mainly social issues, and current affairs stories from around the world. It ran from 5 April 1983 to 2 November 1993, with programmes being shown on the first Tuesday of the month, hence the title. In 1993, Network First was a part replacement for First Tuesday.

== Notable programmes ==
- The Falklands War - The Untold Story (01/04/1987)
- Too Close to Home (6 December 1988), about the Armley asbestos disaster
- The Wigan Hold (1989, filmed 1988), about wrestling at Riley's Gym, featuring former professional wrestlers and Riley's Gym alumni Tommy Moore and Ernie Riley (son of Billy Riley)
- Four Hours in My Lai (02/05/1989 - shown in the US Frontline series as Remember My Lai)
- Sonia's Baby (03/04/1990, narrated by Olivia O'Leary)
- Swing Under the Swastika (02/10/1990, narrated by Alan Plater)
- Cold Blood - The Massacre of East Timor (07/01/1992) Amnesty International UK Media Awards Winner, 1992.
- Katie and Eilish - Siamese Twins (04/08/1992, narrated by Julie Christie - 1993 Peabody Award winner)
- M25, from 1991.
