= Shigeo Miyato =

Japanese former professional wrestler

Personal information
- Born: 4 June 1963 (age 63)

Professional wrestling career
- Ring name(s): Shigeo Miyato; Yuko Miyato
- Billed height: 1.77 m (5 ft 9 1/2 in)
- Billed weight: 103 kg (227 lb)
- Trained by: UWF dojo Akira Maeda; Billy Robinson; Lou Thesz
- Debut: 1985
- Retired: 1995

Shigeo Miyato (宮戸茂雄, Miyato Shigeo; born June 4, 1963) is a Japanese catch wrestling instructor and retired professional wrestler, best known for his work in Universal Wrestling Federation (UWF) and New Japan Pro Wrestling (NJPW). A former student of legendary wrestlers Billy Robinson and Lou Thesz, Miyato is the founder and head coach at the CACC Snake Pit Japan, which he based on the original Snake Pit in England.

== Professional wrestling career ==
=== Early career ===
Shigeo began training under the UWF's dojo, which was a training facility for people wanting to become professional wrestlers in Japan. While he was here, Akira Maeda trained him in becoming a professional wrestler. Training for professional wrestling takes 1–3 years. Shigeo's debut was on September 6, 1985. Miyato's early stages of his career saw him compete in non-televised matches across Japan for various promotions and under the Union Of Professional Wrestling Force Japan (UWF-J) and very few matches with NJPW during this time.

=== New Japan Pro Wrestling and UWF international ===
Miyato signed with NJPW originally in 1985, but he did not start competing consistently until 1987.

On August 19, 1987, Miyato was defeated via submission by Takayuki Iizuka. On August 20, Miyato, Tatsuo Nakano and Yoji Anjo faced Kenichi Oya, Kensuke Sasaki and Osamu Matsuda in a losing effort. Despite losing, the match was highly acclaimed.

In 1991, Miyato was signed by UWF-I (Union Of Professional Wrestling Force International) after noticing his work for the Japanese version. At the UWFi dojo he trained in catch wrestling, learning from Billy Robinson and Lou Thesz. He competed against the likes of Dan "the Beast" Severn and Bob Backlund.

Early into his UWF run, he entered a feud with Tatsuo Nakano in UWF-I, with the two trading numerous victories over the coming months.

=== Retirement ===
In September 1995, he announced his retirement from his professional wrestling in-ring career.

After this, Miyato would take a break from professional wrestling and later train future professional wrestlers. He has commentated on many wrestling shows since.

In 1999, Miyato established the UWF Snake Pit Japan gym (now CACC Snake Pit Japan). He based it on the original Snake Pit in England, where he visited and trained at in 1995. Billy Robinson and Lou Thesz were the first head coaches at Snake Pit Japan.

== Personal life ==
Miyato was born and raised in Kanagawa, Japan. He still lives there today. He took an interest in wrestling from a young age.

== See also ==
- List of New Japan Pro Wrestling personnel
- UWF (alumni)
