= Whelley =

Coordinates: 53.5519°N 2.6142°W

- Location within Greater Manchester
- Population: 10,209 (2001 Census)
- OS grid reference: SD594063
- Metropolitan borough: Wigan
- Metropolitan county: Greater Manchester
- Region: North West
- Country: England
- Sovereign state: United Kingdom
- Post town: WIGAN
- Postcode district: WN1
- Dialling code: 01942
- Police: Greater Manchester
- Fire: Greater Manchester
- Ambulance: North West
- UK Parliament: Wigan

Whelley is an area of northeast Wigan, Greater Manchester, England. Historically part of Lancashire, it is mainly a residential area, between New Springs and Scholes.

In Whelley, there is Canon Sharples Church of England Primary School and Nursery, St Stephen's Church and a Labour club.

Whelley also had its own (non-acute) hospital which specialised in rehabilitation of the elderly, and was part of the Wrightington, Wigan and Leigh NHS Trust. The hospital closed in 2009 and was demolished in late 2010. The site is currently being developed with numerous houses, flats and bungalows.

In terms of local elections, Whelley is grouped with New Springs and Aspull, and is consistently a Labour supporting area, as with the majority of the Metropolitan Borough of Wigan.

Riley's Gym, popularly known as "the Snake Pit", was established in the area in 1948 by professional catch wrestler Billy Riley. It later moved to Aspull.

== See also ==
- List of mining disasters in Lancashire
