= Billy Joyce (wrestler) =

English professional wrestler (1916–2000)

Bob Robinson (3 May 1916 – 15 September 2000), better known as Billy Joyce, was an English professional wrestling. He is known for his association with The Snake Pit.

== Career ==
Robinson made his debut in 1942, working alongside Billy Riley. In 1951, Karl Gotch visited Wigan, which would eventually lead to a match between the two in Hannover.

On 15 April 1958, he won the vacant British Heavyweight Championship, defeating Gordon Nelson in London.

In May 1968, he wrestled in Japan, wrestling against Tauneharu Sugiyama, Rusher Kimura, amongst others.

He died 15 September 2000, aged 84.
