= Billy Riley =

English professional wrestler (1896–1977)

Personal information
- Born: William Harold Riley; 22 June 1896 Leigh, Lancashire, England
- Died: 9 September 1977 or 15 September 1977 (aged 81) Wigan, England

Professional wrestling career
- Ring name: Billy Riley
- Billed height: 5 ft 10.5 in (179 cm)
- Billed weight: 175 lb (79 kg)
- Trained by: Willie Charnock; Peter Burns; Vaino Ketonen
- Debut: 1909
- Retired: 1968

William Harold Riley (22 June 1896 – 9 or 15 September 1977), known by the name Billy Riley, was an English professional wrestler, coach, promoter, and referee. A legitimately skilled wrestler, Riley's career began when professional wrestling bouts were still genuine contests. At various times, Riley was billed as the middleweight champion of the world, British Empire, and England. In 1948, he founded "The Snake Pit" gym in Wigan, where he coached for over 20 years, teaching the Lancashire style of catch wrestling to some of the leading post-World War II wrestlers, including Karl Gotch and Billy Robinson, among others. Riley's students were significant influences on professional wrestling, catch wrestling, and mixed martial arts (MMA), especially in Japan. Riley's Snake Pit has continued to operate and train wrestlers nearly 50 years after his death.

== Biography ==
William Harold Riley was born to Patrick and Jane Riley on June 22, 1896. He became a professional wrestler at fourteen years of age. Riley toured the United States in 1923. He won the World Middleweight Championship the following year, which he claimed for 18 years according to his obituary in the Wigan Observer. He toured South Africa between 1933 and 1934.

During his days as a moulder in the Lancashire town of Wigan, Riley trained with the local miners in the art of Lancashire catch-as-catch-can wrestling

The tough Wigan native soon began showing extraordinary submission skills. Riley was known to be a devastating "hooker" and it showed in his wrestling matches as he soon gained notoriety for breaking his opponent's arms. During the 1930s Riley travelled to Africa to capture a British Empire championship from Jack Robinson.

Riley died in his home in Wigan, on either September 9 or September 15, 1977, aged 81.

Riley was married to Sarah Riley until his death in September 1977. His son Ernie Riley was also a professional wrestler.

=== The Snake Pit ===
Riley decided to teach catch wrestling in Wigan. He and a group of his students built a gym in the Whelley area of Wigan, opening it in 1948. Billy Riley's gym became known as the Snake Pit.

The gym soon became popular for producing some of the most skilled catch wrestlers in the world. Men such as Karl Gotch (Istaz), Bert Assirati, Melvin Riss (Harold Winstanley), John Foley, Jack Dempsey (Tommy Moore), Billy Joyce (Bob Robinson), Billy Robinson and Billy Riley's son Ernie Riley all attended The Snake Pit.

=== Reopening ===
When the son of a former student, Roy Wood, and the son of Wood's friend wanted to learn wrestling they traveled to Wigan, only to see the school in complete disrepair. The roof had literally caved in. With the help of locals, Roy Wood managed to get the gym started again. Riley's gym was reopened. However, this time, since Roy's son Darren and nephew Paul had wanted to learn, the gym was opened to children. Riley decided to take a seat by the mat and let Wood coach.

Teaching the children was a new concept for both Roy and Riley. The results though, soon showed that the teaching at the Snake Pit was still world class. By the age of 10, Darren had won the British Championships alongside local children Paddy Govan, Kevin Govan, Tony Leyland and Neil Maxwell who were also Riley's wrestlers. After competitions, the children would go round to see Riley and his wife, and take the medals and trophies which they had won.

Riley died in 1977. Roy Wood and Tommy Heyes kept the Snake Pit running, and the children visited Riley's wife to show her the trophies and achievements made possible by the efforts of her husband.
