= Shoot (professional wrestling) =

Professional wrestling term

A shoot in professional wrestling is any unplanned, unscripted, or real-life occurrence within a wrestling event. It is a carny term shortened from "straight shooting", which originally referred to a gun in a carnival target shooting game that did not have its sights misaligned. Terminology such as this reflects the professional wrestling industry's roots in traveling carnivals.

Initially, the term referred to practice or ability in catch wrestling as a legitimate sport. It has since come to mean any legit attack or fight in professional wrestling regardless of the combat system employed, and its meaning has broadened to include unscripted events in general. The opposite of a shoot is a work which take place in kayfabe. 'Shoot' may also refer to legitimate 'shooting' for a takedown, as in interscholastic, amateur, and Olympic wrestling.

== Occurrences ==
Professional wrestling is staged entertainment rather than a sports competition. As such, virtually everything in it is worked (part of the show), and shoots rarely occur. Shoots in general are against the nature of the business, similar to an actor ad-libbing or dropping character during a performance. Performers who shoot during a wrestling event are often punished (often by lower pay or relegation to opening bouts) or even fired, since they cannot be relied on to act according to the bookers' wishes. Shoots can also occur when wrestlers stop cooperating in a match. This may occur to teach one of the wrestlers "a lesson" for whatever reason, or if a wrestler has an issue with the promoter and intentionally makes the match look bad.

Some of the earliest instances of shooting during a match were double-crosses. On April 15, 1925, Stanislaus Zbyszko faced Wayne Munn for the World Heavyweight Championship in Philadelphia. Munn, a former college football player with comparatively little legitimate wrestling experience, had been made champion earlier that year as part of a promotional plan by Ed "Strangler" Lewis, Billy Sandow and Toots Mondt. Zbyszko had previously agreed to lose to Munn and had done so in an earlier match, but during their championship rematch he abandoned the planned result and legitimately wrestled Munn instead. Munn was unable to counter the veteran wrestler, and Zbyszko defeated him in two straight falls to take the championship. Wrestling historian Neal Pease described the match as one of professional wrestling's most notable early double-crosses, with the referee ultimately having little choice but to award Zbyszko the victory. Contemporary reports recorded Zbyszko winning the first fall in 8 minutes 11 seconds and the second in 4 minutes 53 seconds, describing Munn's defeat as a major surprise.

Another major double-cross occurred on March 2, 1936, when Dick Shikat challenged Danno O'Mahony for the World Heavyweight Championship at Madison Square Garden. Although Shikat was expected to lose, he instead began legitimately wrestling O'Mahony and repeatedly trapped the less experienced champion in painful holds. After approximately 19 minutes, Shikat applied a hammerlock and threatened to break O'Mahony's arm unless the bout was stopped, forcing O'Mahony to submit and the referee to award Shikat the championship. The result caused considerable disruption to the group of promoters who had controlled the championship, and subsequent litigation over Shikat's contract exposed details of the predetermined nature of professional wrestling. Shikat testified that he had been instructed to lose to O'Mahony but had deliberately disregarded the arrangement and wrestled to win. The promoters associated with O'Mahony subsequently disputed Shikat's claim to the championship, with some jurisdictions continuing to recognise O'Mahony as champion.

On November 25, 1985, Wendi Richter lost the WWF Women's Championship to The Fabulous Moolah at Madison Square Garden in a double-cross. Richter had been scheduled to successfully defend the championship against a masked wrestler known as the Spider Lady and was not informed that the title would change hands. Moolah instead performed under the Spider Lady mask and, during the match, caught Richter in a pinning combination while referee Dick Kroll made a rapid three-count despite Richter raising her shoulder after the count of one. Richter immediately continued attacking her opponent after the bell and removed the mask, revealing Moolah. Richter later recalled that she had realised before the match that the wrestler beneath the mask was not the usual performer portraying the Spider Lady, but did not know that she was going to lose the championship. She left Madison Square Garden immediately afterward and did not wrestle for the WWF again. WWE has retrospectively referred to the incident as the "Original Screwjob", predating the better-known Montreal Screwjob by twelve years.

On April 29, 1986, during a New Japan Pro-Wrestling match between Akira Maeda and André the Giant, the wrestlers ceased cooperating and the bout developed into a legitimate confrontation. André repeatedly refused to engage normally with Maeda, while Maeda responded with increasingly forceful kicks to André's legs and several takedowns. André eventually remained on his back and appeared to invite Maeda to pin him, but Maeda refused, and Antonio Inoki came to ringside as the match ended without a conventional finish. Contemporary explanations for the incident have remained disputed; later accounts have variously attributed André's behaviour to intoxication or to an attempt to discipline Maeda, but no definitive explanation has been established.

In January 1987, during a steel cage match in Florida between Bruiser Brody and Lex Luger, Brody abruptly stopped cooperating with Luger and began refusing to sell his offence. Luger continued attempting to work the match, but Brody largely ignored his punches and later took him down legitimately, leaving Luger visibly confused about how to proceed. Referee Bill Alfonso eventually called for a disqualification after Luger shoved him during an improvised ending, after which Luger climbed over the cage and left the ringside area rather than continuing the bout. Luger later said that he had been genuinely frightened because he did not know what Brody intended to do, while accounts have differed over why Brody stopped cooperating; proposed explanations have included frustration with the inexperienced Luger and dissatisfaction with the promotion, but no definitive motive has been established.

On April 1, 1991, during a Super World of Sports event at Kobe World Memorial Hall, former sumo wrestlers Kōji Kitao and John Tenta faced each other in a match that deteriorated into a legitimate confrontation. Kitao became increasingly uncooperative, repeatedly leaving the ring and at one point throwing a ringside table, before the two men began threatening one another with legitimate eye-gouging attempts. Kitao eventually kicked the referee and was disqualified. After leaving the ring, he took a microphone and repeatedly called Tenta a yaochō yarō ("fixed-match bastard"), publicly breaking kayfabe by accusing professional wrestling of being fixed. The incident led to Kitao being dismissed by SWS and became one of the most notorious controversies of his professional wrestling career.

In May 2001, during a match taped for the WWF programmes Jakked and Metal, Perry Saturn legitimately attacked enhancement wrestler Mike Bell after Bell mishandled several moves and caused Saturn to land on his head. Saturn responded with a series of stiff strikes before forcefully throwing Bell from the ring, causing Bell to land awkwardly on his head and neck, and subsequently sending him into the steel steps. Saturn later told Sports Illustrated that Bell had not hurt him deliberately, but that the impacts had left him "out on [his] feet" and that he blacked out before attacking Bell. He said WWF management was angered by his actions and later characterised his subsequent comedic storyline involving a mop named "Moppy" as a form of punishment for the incident.

During the third season of Tough Enough in 2002, Hardcore Holly took part in a training match with contestant Matt Cappotelli in which Holly legitimately struck Cappotelli with unusually stiff offence, leaving him with facial injuries and visibly distressed. WWE later described the encounter as one of the programme's most infamous moments, while Holly defended his actions as an attempt to test Cappotelli's toughness and argued that physical punishment was an inherent part of professional wrestling training. The incident was subsequently revisited on WWE programming and was later incorporated into an Ohio Valley Wrestling storyline in 2003, culminating in a match between Holly and Cappotelli.

At ECW One Night Stand (2005), JBL legitimately attacked The Blue Meanie during the mass brawl that closed the event, repeatedly striking him in the face and reopening a wound that had been closed with 14 staples the previous day. The incident stemmed from genuine animosity between the two men dating to Meanie's earlier tenure in the WWF. Meanie later acknowledged that, after leaving the company, he had publicly criticised JBL in interviews, including calling him an "asshole", because he believed JBL had bullied him backstage; he later said that he had misinterpreted some of JBL's behaviour, which JBL characterised as the kind of ribs and "ball-breaking" he had experienced while playing football. Accounts of what immediately precipitated the attack differ. JBL claimed that before the closing brawl Meanie had delivered an unscripted promo accusing him of causing his WWF release and advancing his own career by ingratiating himself with Vince McMahon, and that after JBL initially struck him "snug", Meanie began throwing heavy punches, causing JBL to retaliate. Meanie, by contrast, described being caught off guard by JBL's attack and said JBL shouted about comments Meanie had made about him on the Internet while striking him. Meanie subsequently considered taking legal action, but when he returned to WWE several weeks later, he and JBL met privately and agreed to turn their legitimate dispute into an angle, with JBL telling him that they could either "fight or make money". On the July 7 episode of SmackDown!, Meanie reunited with Stevie Richards and Nova as the Blue World Order, interrupted JBL using his own limousine and spray-painted "bWo" on its hood before Meanie challenged him to a No Disqualification match. During the match Richards struck JBL with an extremely forceful chair shot that legitimately bloodied him, before Batista also interfered and helped Meanie pin JBL. Meanie subsequently described the attack on JBL as a wrestling "receipt" for what had happened at One Night Stand.

On February 22, 2015, during a Stardom event at Korakuen Hall in Tokyo, Yoshiko's defence of the World of Stardom Championship against Act Yasukawa deteriorated into a legitimate fight. Yoshiko repeatedly struck Yasukawa in the face with punches and palm strikes, leaving her badly swollen and bleeding before Yasukawa's second, Kyoko Kimura, threw in the towel and the match was stopped. Yasukawa was taken to hospital and was subsequently diagnosed with fractures of her cheekbone, nasal bone and left orbital floor, as well as retinal concussions in both eyes. The incident became widely known in the Japanese media as the "seisan match" (凄惨マッチ), variously translated as the "ghastly match" or "gruesome match". Stardom president Rossy Ogawa said that the match had gone beyond the bounds of professional wrestling, and the promotion later changed Yoshiko's victory to a no contest, stripped her of the World of Stardom Championship and suspended her indefinitely. Yoshiko publicly apologised for injuring Yasukawa.

On August 26, 2017, during Triplemanía XXV, Sexy Star defended the AAA Reina de Reinas Championship in a four-way match against Rosemary, Lady Shani and Ayako Hamada. During the match, Sexy Star and Lady Shani were reported to have begun legitimately fighting with one another, and at the finish Sexy Star applied an armbar to Rosemary and continued exerting pressure after Rosemary submitted, legitimately injuring her arm. Rosemary subsequently described the incident as deliberate and accused Sexy Star of taking liberties with her after she had trusted her to perform the move safely. Sexy Star later disputed that she had intentionally injured Rosemary, maintaining that the injury was accidental. The incident drew widespread condemnation from other wrestlers and led to Sexy Star being removed from at least one subsequent wrestling appearance.

At the Royal Rumble (2018), Brock Lesnar defended the Universal Championship against Braun Strowman and Kane in a triple threat match. During the match, Strowman accidentally struck Lesnar hard in the side of the head with a knee, prompting Lesnar to respond with a legitimate right-handed punch to Strowman's head before telling him to slow down. The retaliation was an example of what is traditionally known in professional wrestling as a "receipt", in which a wrestler responds to an unexpectedly stiff or careless strike by delivering a legitimate or unusually forceful strike of their own. Strowman later characterised the exchange as a case of "you hit me, I hit you back" and said that he and Lesnar apologised to one another and laughed about the incident after returning backstage.

On August 30, 2021, during an episode of Raw, a match between Nia Jax and Charlotte Flair briefly developed into a legitimate confrontation after a breakdown in communication. The two wrestlers exchanged unusually stiff slaps and punches and momentarily stopped cooperating with one another before regaining control of the match and completing its planned finish, with Jax defeating Flair. Jax later confirmed that the encounter had genuinely become heated, attributing the incident to a miscommunication and saying that she and Flair had begun legitimately striking one another during the match.

=== Fan interference ===
While the term technically applies only to wrestling performers, crowds also cause shoots by interfering in events, usually by assaulting or attempting to assault a wrestler. Fan interference and violence was prevalent in the northeastern and southern United States from the mid to late 20th century, where many wrestling territories became known for offering violent action to a rabid, fiercely loyal audience which largely believed in what it was seeing.

In 1988, during a steel cage match between "Macho Man" Randy Savage and "The Million Dollar Man" Ted DiBiase at New York City's Madison Square Garden, a fan jumped the guardrail during a tense moment in the match. DiBiase, recalling the incident in his autobiography, yelled for Virgil (DiBiase's bodyguard, who was attempting to interfere in the match) to knock the man down, which he did, before security led the suspect away as the match played out as intended (Savage knocking the heads of DiBiase and Virgil together before escaping the cage).

On April 6, 1998, during a WWF live event in Berlin, Germany, a fan entered the ring following a match between Stone Cold Steve Austin and Triple H and attempted to attack Austin. Triple H immediately tackled the fan to the mat and struck him repeatedly while referee Mike Chioda also intervened, before security removed the fan from the ring. Austin later recalled the incident on his podcast, praising Triple H for protecting him and explaining that, because Austin was portraying a babyface in the match, he felt unable to join in the assault on the intruder. Austin described Triple H as a "stand-up cat" who was "watching my back", and said that although spectators were entitled to cheer, boo or criticise wrestlers, anyone who crossed the barricade or entered the ring had crossed a line and was considered "fair game" by the performers.

In 2002, during a ladder match between Eddie Guerrero and Rob Van Dam, a fan jumped the guardrail, got into the ring, and knocked over the ladder while Guerrero was climbing it. Guerrero noticed what was going on, landed on his feet, and kicked the fan a few times before security took him away.

On July 30, 2013, during a WWE live event in Cape Town, South Africa, a spectator entered the ringside area and attacked Randy Orton after his match. As Orton stood on a turnbuckle posing to the crowd, the fan struck him from behind with a low blow before being restrained by security. Orton briefly confronted the attacker before leaving the ringside area. WWE stated that the spectator was arrested and later pleaded guilty to assault.

During a match with Bray Wyatt at a WWE house show in Victoria, British Columbia in August 2015, Roman Reigns was struck in the head by a replica Money in the Bank briefcase thrown by a fan. Reigns was momentarily dazed by the incident, but was able to continue the match. Reigns later said that he initially believed Wyatt had accidentally struck him with a kendo stick, and only realised what had happened after seeing the briefcase in the ring. He recalled becoming angry before the referee calmed him down and security dealt with the spectator, after which he and Wyatt continued the match. Reigns said that he was not seriously hurt but condemned the fan's actions as disrespectful and disruptive to the show.

On April 6, 2019, during the WWE Hall of Fame ceremony at Barclays Center in Brooklyn, New York, a spectator entered the ring and tackled Bret Hart while Hart was delivering the Hart Foundation's induction speech alongside Natalya. Several wrestlers and security personnel immediately subdued the attacker and removed him from the arena. Hart was able to continue the ceremony and did not suffer serious injury. The attacker was subsequently arrested and charged with assault and criminal trespass.

On November 22, 2021, during an episode of Raw also at Barclays Center, a spectator jumped the barricade and tackled Seth Rollins as Rollins was walking up the entrance ramp following a segment with Finn Bálor. Rollins and the attacker briefly struggled on the ground before WWE officials and security intervened, while the television broadcast quickly cut away from the incident. The New York City Police Department said that Rollins suffered swelling to his lip but declined medical treatment. The spectator was arrested and charged with attempted assault and attempted violation of New York's arts and cultural affairs law for disrupting a live sporting event. Rollins later said that he chose not to pursue charges after learning that the attacker had allegedly been deceived by someone impersonating Rollins online, explaining that he believed the man needed help rather than incarceration.

=== Worked shoots ===
Worked shoot is the term for any occurrence that is scripted by the creative team to appear unscripted and therefore give the impression of being a real-life happening, while remaining part of the show. This can be seen as an example of writers breaking the fourth wall and attempting to appeal to fans who are interested in shoots (i.e. events outside traditional in-ring storylines). Notable characteristics of worked shoots include references to terms and information generally known only to industry insiders and "smart" fans. These fans are sometimes referred to as "smarks".

A major example of a worked shoot occurred on the June 27, 2011 episode of Raw, where CM Punk delivered a promo popularly known as the "pipebomb" promo. In it, Punk aired his grievances with WWE and announced that he would leave the promotion three weeks later with the WWE Championship (Punk would sign a new contract during this period); the promo was not cut off until Punk mentioned the WWE's anti-bullying campaign. To provide an air of legitimacy, Punk received a kayfabe suspension from the company following the promo.

The worked shoot became particularly associated with writer Vince Russo, especially during his tenure in World Championship Wrestling. Russo frequently incorporated references to backstage politics, contractual disputes and the predetermined nature of professional wrestling into storylines in an attempt to blur the distinction between legitimate events and scripted angles. His handling of Bash at the Beach (2000) has been cited as a prominent example of his use of the worked-shoot format.

Another example occurred in late 1997, when Jim Cornette delivered a series of worked-shoot promos on Raw in which he openly criticised trends and personalities within both the WWF and rival promotion World Championship Wrestling. In an October 6 promo, Cornette praised wrestlers including Arn Anderson and Ric Flair while criticising Eric Bischoff and the New World Order, presenting the segment as his personal opinion rather than a conventional storyline promo. The segment originated from similar comments Cornette had made on WWF.com's audio programming and led to further appearances in the same style. Cornette later described the segments as "semi-shoot" rants and said that, after several weeks, WWF attempted to script them more closely, leading him to abandon the concept.

In 1996, Brian Pillman developed his "Loose Cannon" persona in World Championship Wrestling through an elaborate worked shoot intended to make him appear genuinely uncontrollable. Pillman increasingly blurred the distinction between his on-screen character and his real behaviour, making references to wrestling's backstage workings, arriving late to events and behaving erratically both on and off camera. During a February 1996 match with WCW booker Kevin Sullivan, Pillman abruptly stopped wrestling, told Sullivan "I respect you, booker man" and walked out, openly acknowledging Sullivan's legitimate backstage role in what was presented as an unscripted act of defiance. WCW president Eric Bischoff subsequently presented Pillman as having become too unpredictable to employ and announced that he had been fired. Contemporary reporting revealed, however, that the conflict and firing were part of a deliberately secretive angle devised by Pillman, Sullivan and Bischoff, with many WCW employees themselves being kept unaware that it was a work. The storyline ultimately blurred into reality when Pillman persuaded Bischoff to grant him an actual contractual release to make the firing more convincing, after which Pillman appeared in Extreme Championship Wrestling and ultimately signed with the rival World Wrestling Federation rather than returning to WCW.

== Shoot interview ==
A "shoot interview" is generally conducted and released by someone other than a wrestling promotion. They are conducted out of character with a wrestler, promoter, manager, or other insider generally being interviewed about their career and asked to give their opinion on wrestlers, promotions, or specific events in their past. While some wrestlers used these as an opportunity to insult people or promotions they dislike, many are more reflective accounts of their careers. Shoot interviews have historically been released on VHS and DVD, and later through video on demand, YouTube and wrestling podcasts.

Precursors to the modern shoot interview existed in wrestling journalism before the format became commercially established. Wrestling journalist Bill Apter has described interviews he conducted for wrestling magazines in the early 1970s as early examples of what would later be called shoot interviews. Apter recalled that the first of these developed after Bruno Sammartino objected to inaccuracies in an earlier magazine profile, leading Apter to conduct an approximately two-hour question-and-answer interview about Sammartino's life; similar interviews were subsequently conducted with wrestlers including Mil Máscaras. Unlike later shoot interviews, however, these discussions continued to respect kayfabe: wrestlers spoke truthfully about aspects of their personal lives while still presenting professional wrestling matches as legitimate contests and avoiding terminology that acknowledged their predetermined nature. As access to backstage information expanded through wrestling newsletters and later digital media, shoot interviews became part of a wider body of independently produced wrestling media. Scholars S. M. Walus and Connor D. Wilcox have grouped shoot interviews with [restling newsletters and podcasts as forms of fan-produced media that focus on the factual or "shoot" elements of professional wrestling and can provide alternative historical narratives to those presented by wrestling promotions.

A prominent producer of shoot interviews has been RF Video, which built a large catalogue of long-form interviews with wrestlers and other wrestling personalities. Its releases commonly consisted of several-hour interviews covering a subject's career, backstage experiences and opinions on other performers and promotions. Interviewees have included Bret Hart, Kevin Nash, Roddy Piper, Raven, New Jack, Shane Douglas, Kenny Omega, The Iron Sheik, and The Honky Tonk Man. RF Video subsequently made much of its shoot interview catalogue available digitally. Some individual releases were particularly lengthy and candid; a 2004 RF Video interview with New Jack, for example, was later combined with a follow-up interview discussing his subsequent arrest and other controversies.

Another company associated with the format was Kayfabe Commentaries, co-founded by Sean Oliver. Its YouShoot series modified the traditional shoot interview format by allowing wrestling fans to submit questions through email and webcam, which Oliver would then put directly to the guest. The series also incorporated recurring games and segments alongside conventional career discussion. Guests included Jim Cornette, Kevin Sullivan, Scott Hall, Shane Douglas, Maria Kanellis and Tammy Lynn Sytch.

While shoot interviews traditionally developed outside the major wrestling promotions, wrestling companies have also produced their own programmes in which performers discuss the wrestling business and their careers outside of character. An early example was WWE Confidential, a weekly magazine-style programme launched by WWE in 2002. Hosted by Gene Okerlund, the programme featured interviews, wrestler profiles, historical features and behind-the-scenes stories, and was later described by WWE as having "pulled back the curtain" on the wrestling business through its insider reporting. A later example is the Netflix documentary series WWE: Unreal, first released in 2025. Produced in partnership with WWE, the series follows performers and staff behind the scenes and shows the company's writers' room, storyline development and preparations for televised events. Unlike independent shoot interviews, programmes such as WWE Confidential and WWE: Unreal are officially produced and present backstage material with the participation and editorial involvement of WWE itself.

Another WWE-produced example was Steve Austin's Broken Skull Sessions, a long-form interview series hosted and produced by Stone Cold Steve Austin that premiered on the WWE Network on November 24, 2019. The programme featured Austin conducting one-on-one interviews with current and former wrestlers, discussing their careers, backstage experiences, personal lives and the circumstances surrounding notable matches and storylines. The first episode featured The Undertaker, who discussed his early career, the development of his character and the end of his undefeated WrestleMania streak. Subsequent guests included Goldberg, Kane, The Big Show and Bret Hart. Although produced and distributed by WWE, the programme shared many characteristics with independent shoot interviews, including extended out-of-character discussions and recollections of events ordinarily concealed by kayfabe.

As wrestling media shifted towards online distribution, podcasts increasingly inherited many of the functions of the traditional shoot interview. Long-form conversations with wrestlers, promoters and other industry figures could be distributed episodically through online podcast platforms and subscription services. These programmes commonly retain the shoot interview's emphasis on out-of-character discussion of backstage politics, disputed events, creative decisions and personal relationships, while often revisiting particular matches, promotions or periods in wrestling history. Academic research into wrestling fan media has grouped podcasts and vodcasts alongside shoot interviews as forms of independently produced media that allow insiders to discuss the factual or "shoot" history of professional wrestling outside the narratives presented by wrestling promotions. Programmes such as Something to Wrestle, originally hosted by Bruce Prichard and Conrad Thompson, adopted a similar retrospective format, using extended discussions of specific events and periods to combine first-hand recollections with examination of wrestling history and backstage decision-making.

While shoot interviews generally occur outside a show, one rare example of a shoot interview during a televised show occurred on October 23, 1999, when Doug Gilbert, then with the Memphis independent promotion Power Pro Wrestling, turned a televised interview intended to further a feud with Brian Christopher into a shoot that soon led to the demise of the promotion. Gilbert publicly exposed the fact that Jerry Lawler, previously the owner of the USWA, another significant Memphis-based promotion, was Brian's father—a blatant violation of kayfabe, the portrayal of events within professional wrestling as not being staged (in this case, Brian "not" being Jerry's son). He also made disparaging remarks about both Lawlers, as well as the promotion's booker Randy Hales.

== Shoot fighting ==
Drawing from this related term, a shooter or shoot-fighter is not a wrestler with a reputation for being uncooperative but one who has legit hooking skills in their repertoire. These wrestlers often gain their skills from martial arts (Ken Shamrock or Josh Barnett), catch wrestling (Lou Thesz or Billy Robinson) or amateur wrestling (Kurt Angle or Brock Lesnar). These kinds of shooters are sometimes referred to as stretchers (from their ability to use legitimate holds on their opponents to stretch them).

Despite the worked nature of the spectacle, shooters have been around since the beginning. Originally, the National Wrestling Alliance's World Champion was typically a shooter or "hooker" in an effort to keep regional champions and other contenders from attempting to shoot on them and win the title when they were not scheduled to do so.

In Japan, the relationship between professional wrestling and legitimate fighting became particularly prominent during the 1980s with the emergence of the Universal Wrestling Federation (UWF) and the development of shoot-style wrestling. Founded in 1984, the original UWF sought to present a more realistic form of professional wrestling, incorporating catch wrestling, submission grappling, kickboxing, and other martial arts. Wrestlers such as Akira Maeda, Yoshiaki Fujiwara, Nobuhiko Takada, and Satoru Sayama helped popularize a style emphasizing low kicks, takedowns, joint locks, chokeholds, and submission holds rather than the elaborate theatrics of conventional professional wrestling. Although UWF matches generally featured predetermined outcomes, many of its wrestlers possessed legitimate grappling and martial arts skills, contributing to the shoot scene's reputation for authenticity. Following the original promotion's dissolution in 1986 and the subsequent collapse of the Newborn UWF in 1990, the scene fragmented into promotions such as UWF International and Fighting Network RINGS, while related developments led to legitimate fighting organizations such as Shooto and Pancrase.

A notable example of a promotion deliberately staging legitimate competition was the WWF Brawl for All, a shootfighting tournament held by the World Wrestling Federation in 1998. Unlike conventional professional wrestling matches, the tournament's results were not predetermined. The bouts combined elements of boxing and amateur wrestling, with competitors wearing boxing gloves and earning points for punches, takedowns and knockdowns, while a knockout immediately ended the contest. Matches consisted of three one-minute rounds. The tournament caused several legitimate injuries and produced unexpected results, most notably when Bart Gunn knocked out heavily favoured "Dr. Death" Steve Williams. Gunn subsequently defeated Bradshaw by knockout in the final to win the tournament. The Brawl for All therefore differed from most wrestling shoots in that the legitimate fighting was authorised and promoted in advance rather than arising unexpectedly during a worked match.

The use of the term "shoot" to describe a single or double-leg takedown attempt (in legit fighting situations such as mixed martial arts) is inspired by early professional wrestling shooters, who would often utilize these basic wrestling moves when shooting on an opponent (as opposed to the flashier takedowns used in worked matches, such as suplexes).

An example of shoot fighting happened on the November 4, 2004, episode of SmackDown!, taped in St. Louis, Missouri. During an unscripted segment of Tough Enough, Kurt Angle, a former American amateur wrestler and 1996 Olympic gold medalist, challenged the finalists to a squat thrust competition. Chris Nawrocki won the competition, and the prize Nawrocki won was a match against Angle. Angle quickly took Nawrocki down with a guillotine choke, but Nawrocki managed to make it to the ropes, forcing Angle to break the hold. Angle then took Nawrocki down with a double leg takedown, breaking his ribs. Angle locked another guillotine choke on Nawrocki, pinning him in the process. After Angle defeated Nawrocki, Angle challenged the other finalists. Daniel Puder, an American professional mixed martial artist, accepted Angle's challenge. Angle and Puder wrestled for position, with Angle taking Puder down; however, in the process, Puder locked Angle in a kimura lock. With Puder on his back and Angle's arm locked in the kimura, Angle pushed Puder's shoulders down, pinning him. One of the two referees in the ring, Jim Korderas, quickly counted three to end the bout, despite the fact that Puder's shoulders were not fully down on the mat, bridging up at two. Puder later claimed he would have snapped Angle's arm on national television if Korderas had not ended the match. Dave Meltzer and Dave Scherer gave these following comments:

It was real. If you don't follow fighting, Puder had Angle locked in the Kimura, or keylock as Tazz called it, although Tazz didn't let on the move was fully executed. Not only was Angle not getting out of the move, but most MMA fighters would have tapped already. Angle couldn't tap for obvious reasons. The ref counted a three even though Puder's shoulders weren't fully down, trying to end the thing, because the reality was Angle would have been in surgery had it gone a few seconds longer or had Puder not given up the hold.

— Dave Meltzer

As you would expect, Kurt Angle was less than happy backstage at Smackdown after almost being forced to tap out to Tough Enough contestant Daniel Puder. Downright ticked off would probably be the best way to describe his mood. The unscripted nature of the contest was the main reason that Angle was made to look so bad since Puder just reacted to the situation and could have forced Angle to submit had the referees not thought quickly and counted a pin that wasn’t there on Puder.

— Dave Scherer

The term is also often used by wrestling fans, in another definition (in this case, also known as shoot wrestling) to refer to mixed martial arts competitions, which, while superficially similar to wrestling matches, are actual athletic competition rather than sports entertainment.

== Other shoots ==
Example of spontaneous events that are not shoots include mistakes by wrestlers (these are known as botches) or matches where the wrestlers are good enough to not need to plan and rehearse beforehand. In such matches the wrestlers go into the match with only the length of the match and what the result should be, and work with each other off instinct and experience, often by "calling spots" in a voice low enough the crowd cannot hear until they reach the finish. The job of the referee will usually involve reminding them of time limits and often calling for the match to "go home" to the intended ending. Another way a referee may be involved is if there is an injury, or one of the wrestlers fails to respond to a 10 count or a pin. In some promotions referees are instructed to adjudicate regardless of the intended finish, resulting in a shoot ending with an "incorrect" winner, or one where the match finish is different.

Shoots may also involve those outside the wrestling business. In 1984, while filming a 20/20 segment on professional wrestling, reporter John Stossel remarked to wrestler David "Dr. D" Schultz that wrestling was fake. Yelling "You think this is fake?", Schultz slapped him and knocked him to the ground twice. Stossel claimed that he still suffered from pain and buzzing in his ears eight weeks after the assault. Schultz maintains that he attacked Stossel because WWF owner Vince McMahon wanted him to.

A similar incident occurred in April 1997 while the WWF was touring Kuwait. Vader and The Undertaker appeared on the television programme Good Morning Kuwait, where host Bassam Al Othman asked the wrestlers whether professional wrestling was fake. After The Undertaker responded to the question, Vader overturned a table, grabbed Al Othman by his tie and aggressively confronted him over the suggestion that wrestling was not real. Vader was subsequently detained and placed under house arrest in Kuwait, while Al Othman later sued the WWF over its use of footage of the incident. Vader later maintained that he believed he had been following instructions from a producer to exaggerate his reaction for the programme, saying that he had been told to perform the confrontation and had not intended it as a genuine assault.

On May 29, 2011, during an All Japan Pro Wrestling event at Kobe Sambo Hall, wrestler TARU, leader of the Voodoo Murders stable, physically assaulted fellow stablemate Nobukazu Hirai, who performed under the ring name Super Hate, in a backstage dressing room before the show. Hirai subsequently competed in a match but collapsed afterward and was hospitalised with an acute subdural hematoma, requiring emergency brain surgery. All Japan indefinitely suspended TARU and three other Voodoo Murders members who had been present during the incident, dissolved the stable and stripped its members of their championships. The promotion's president, Keiji Muto, subsequently resigned on June 7, taking responsibility for the incident. In November, TARU and fellow wrestler MAZADA were arrested on suspicion of causing bodily injury to Hirai. Both were subsequently prosecuted for assault rather than bodily injury, receiving fines of ¥300,000 and ¥200,000 respectively in December 2011.

At Victory Road (2011), Jeff Hardy challenged Sting for the TNA World Heavyweight Championship in the main event, but the match was abruptly shortened because Hardy was in no condition to perform normally. Hardy later acknowledged that he had taken Soma and was impaired during the match, saying that he "couldn't even wrestle". After Hardy entered the ring, Eric Bischoff came to ringside and spoke privately to both wrestlers before Sting quickly hit Hardy with the Scorpion Death Drop and pinned him, ending the match after approximately 90 seconds. Bischoff later explained that he improvised an on-screen angle around the situation, delivering a promo while simultaneously attempting to communicate to Hardy, Sting and the referee that the match needed to be ended immediately, so that the sudden change would appear to viewers to be part of the show. Sting later said that he had realised something was wrong with Hardy before the bout and that the situation had "come to a head" that night. Following the event, TNA acknowledged that Victory Road had "fallen short" of its usual pay-per-view standard and offered purchasers six months of free access to its online video library. When Hardy returned to television six months later, TNA incorporated the real-life incident into his on-screen redemption storyline; after Hardy publicly acknowledged that he had "hit rock bottom" at Victory Road, he was shown attempting to apologise to AJ Styles, who confronted him over the effect his actions had had on the promotion and its wrestlers.

At All In (2023), CM Punk and Jack Perry became involved in a legitimate backstage physical altercation shortly before Punk's match against Samoa Joe. The confrontation followed tensions between the two wrestlers and occurred after Perry's match on the event's pre-show. AEW subsequently conducted an investigation into the incident, and on September 2 terminated Punk's wrestling and employment contracts with cause following a unanimous recommendation from its disciplinary committee and outside legal counsel. AEW president Tony Khan said that the incident had endangered people backstage and that, for the first time at a wrestling event, he had felt that his own "security, safety [and] life" were in danger. Perry subsequently remained absent from AEW television for several months.

AEW later incorporated the real-life incident into an on-screen storyline involving Perry, The Young Bucks and FTR. On the April 10, 2024 episode of Dynamite, the Young Bucks presented genuine backstage security footage of the Punk–Perry confrontation while building towards their match against FTR at Dynasty. In storyline, the Bucks blamed the incident for distracting them before their loss to FTR at All In, referred to Perry as a "scapegoat", and suggested that FTR's friendship with Punk had contributed to the situation. Perry returned to AEW at Dynasty, interfering in the Young Bucks' ladder match against FTR and helping the Bucks win the AEW World Tag Team Championship, after which he became associated with their incarnation of The Elite.

== See also ==
- Kayfabe
- Shoot wrestling
- Catch wrestling
- Montreal Screwjob
- Job (professional wrestling)
- Glossary of professional wrestling terms
- Breaking the fourth wall
- Breaking character
