= Side =

Side or Sides may refer to:

== Geometry ==
- Edge (geometry) of a polygon (two-dimensional shape)
- Face (geometry) of a polyhedron (three-dimensional shape)

== Places ==
- Side, Turkey, a city in Turkey
- Side (Ainis), a town of Ainis, ancient Thessaly, Greece
- Side (Caria), a town of ancient Caria, Anatolia
- Side (Laconia), a town of ancient Laconia, Greece
- Side (Pontus), a town of ancient Pontus, Anatolia
- Side (Ukraine), a village in Ukraine
- Side, Iran, a village in Iran
- Side, Gloucestershire, or Syde, a village in England

== Music ==
- Side (recording), the A-side or B-side of a record
- The Side, a Scottish rock band
- Sides (album), a 1979 album by Anthony Phillips
- Sides, a 2020 album by Emily King
- "Side" (song), a 2001 song by Travis
- "Sides", a song by Flobots from the album The Circle in the Square, 2012
- "Sides", a song by Allday from the album Speeding, 2017

== Teams ==
- Side (cue sports technique)
- Side, a team, in particular:
  - Sports team

== Other uses ==
- Side (gay sex), a sex role
- Side (mythology), in Greek mythology
- Side, a Morris dance team
- Side (company), a global gaming services company
- Sides, British restaurant chain created by the Sidemen
- Sideboard (cards), known as a "side" in some collectible card games
- Sides (surname), a surname
- Side dish, a food item accompanying a main course
- School of Isolated and Distance Education, a public school in Perth, Western Australia
- Secretariat of Intelligence, an Argentinian intelligence agency
- Social identity model of deindividuation effects, in social psychology

== See also ==
- Relative direction, left and right
- Syde
- Cide (disambiguation)
- Sidle (disambiguation)
- Site (disambiguation)
