= Suplex =

Wrestling maneuver

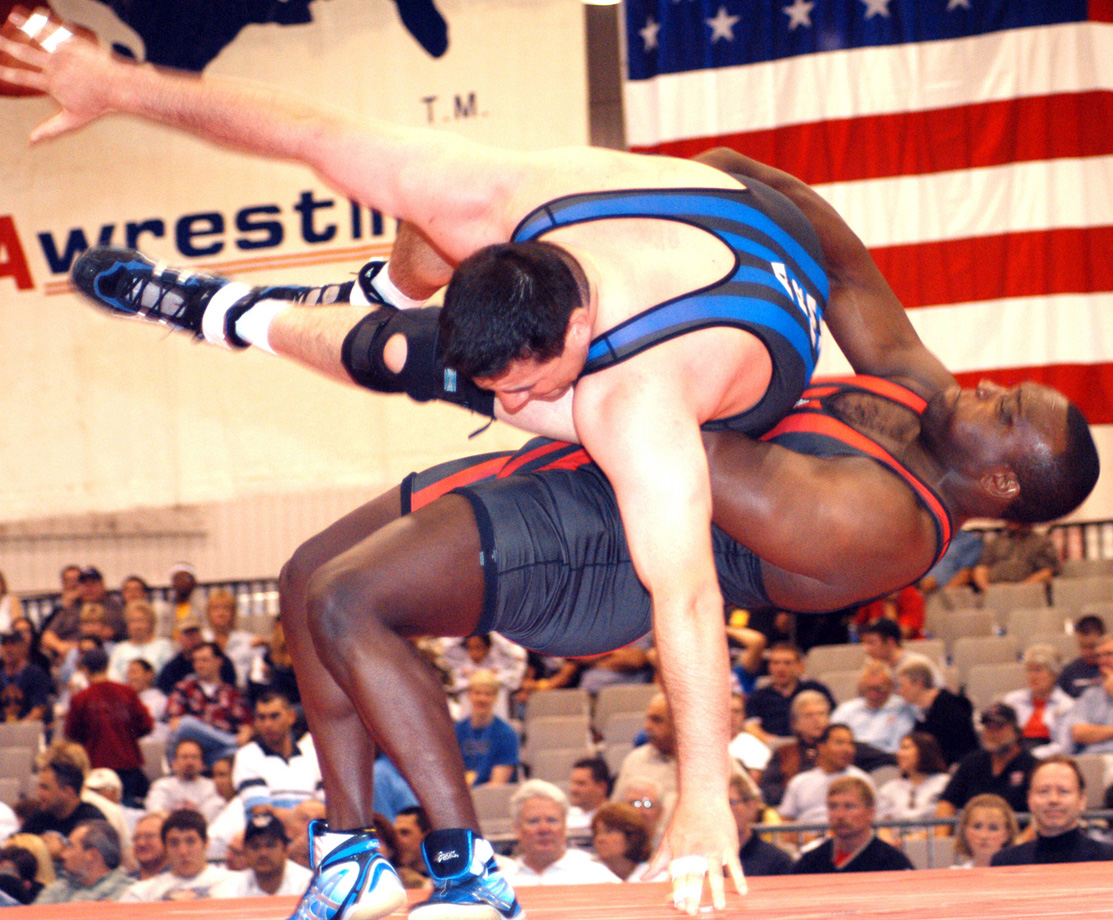
A suplex being performed in a sport wrestling competition

A suplex is an offensive move used in sport wrestling as well as amateur wrestling and professional wrestling. It is a throw that involves lifting the opponents and bridging or rolling to slam them on their backs.

Professional wrestling features many different varieties of suplexes. These are among the most common, but many more exist, particularly as the signature techniques of individual wrestlers.

== Front facelock variants ==
In these suplexes, the wrestlers begin by facing each other, the attacking wrestler then applies a front facelock to the opponent before executing a throw. In most cases, the opponent is suspended upside-down during part of the move. The most common front facelock suplex is the vertical suplex.

=== Fallaway suplex ===
Otherwise known as a reverse suplex or an alley-oop. The wrestler lifts their opponent so that they are seated on the wrestler's shoulders, facing away from them, as in a powerbomb. The wrestler then falls backwards while throwing the opponent the same way, dropping them down to the mat on their chest. Another version sees the wrestler pick the opponent up on to their shoulders in a powerbomb position and dropping backwards while throwing the opponent so that the opponent flips forward and lands on their neck and upper back. A bridging variant is also available.

==== Package fallaway suplex ====
This variation of the fallaway suplex sees the wrestler lifting the opponent so that they are seated on the attacking wrestler's shoulders as in a powerbomb. The wrestler then grabs the opponent's head and forces them into a "package" position. From there the wrestler falls backwards, throwing the opponent over their head, forcing them to land on their upper back and neck. A bridging variation is also possible. This move is used by Dragon Lee, Kota Ibushi (both are calling it the Phoenix-Plex) and it was formerly used by Kevin Steen.

=== Fisherman suplex ===
Also known as a fisherman's suplex or the leg hook suplex, this move has the opponent in a front facelock with the near arm draped over the attacker's shoulder; the wrestler hooks the opponent's near leg behind the opponent's knee with their free arm and falls backwards, flipping the opponent onto their back. In most cases, the attacking wrestler will keep the leg hooked and bridge to pin the opponent in a cradle-like position, as in the case of Mr. Perfect and Curtis Axel's Perfect-plex. Other times the wrestler will apply a leglock submission hold to the hooked leg. It is used by Peyton Royce as the Venus Flytrap, as well as Penelope Ford.

==== Swinging fisherman suplex ====
More commonly referred to as swinging fisherman neckbreaker, it is a swinging variation of the standard fisherman suplex; this move has a wrestler, with the opponent in a front facelock with the near arm draped over their shoulder, hook the opponent's near leg with their free arm and roll over to the same side of the arm being used to hook the opponent's leg, flipping the opponent over onto their back. This was used by WWE superstar Tyson Kidd right before his career ended. This move is currently used by Tony D'Angelo called Fuhgeddaboutit.

=== Hammerlock suplex ===
In this variation of the suplex, the attacker applies a hammerlock on the opponent before applying a front facelock and positioning the opponent's free arm over the attacker's head. The attacker then lifts up the opponent and falls backwards, dropping the opponent down back first, landing with their trapped arm bent behind their back. Junji Hirata has innovated this move.

=== Slingshot suplex ===
The attacker faces a standing opponent with one side of the ring immediately behind the opponent. The attacker applies a front facelock to the opponent, takes hold of the opponent with their free hand, then lifts the opponent until they are nearly vertical. The attacker then falls forward so that the torso of the opponent bounces off the top ring rope, and uses this momentum to quickly lift the opponent overhead once more and fall backwards, driving the back and shoulders of the opponent into the ground. Tully Blanchard used this maneuver as his finishing hold during his runs in Jim Crockett Promotions and the WWF.

=== Suplex slam ===
This move is similar to most suplexes and starts with the attacker applying a front face lock to the opponent and draping the opponent's near arm over their shoulder, then lifting the opponent up and holding them in the vertical position. This is where the move differs from most of its counterparts, with the attacker not falling with the opponent, but rather shifting themselves slightly and throwing the opponent to the mat on their back. Sometimes this involves the wrestler turning the opponent in midair and slamming the opponent down to the mat in front of them onto their back, similar to a high-angled body slam. The suplex slam can also be used for other suplexes such as the fisherman suplex or gutwrench suplex.

There is also a sitout version. Also called a suplex driver or a Falcon Arrow, this sees an attacker apply a front facelock to the opponent and drape the opponent's near arm over their shoulder. The attacker then takes hold of the opponent's torso with their free arm and lifts the opponent to a vertical position. The facelock is loosened so the opponent can be twisted slightly, then the attacker falls to a sit-out position and the victim's back and shoulders are driven into the mat. The opponent lands between the attacker's legs with their head toward them. This variation was innovated by Hayabusa, and is also used by Damian Priest and Seth Rollins among others, with the former calling the move the Broken Arrow.

Another variation sees the wrestler perform a vertical suplex, but instead of twisting the upside down opponent to face them, the wrestler turns 180° to face the opponent before sitting down and driving them back-first between their legs.

==== Reverse suplex slam ====
Also called a front drop suplex or a gourdbuster, this move sees the attacker apply a front face lock to the opponent and drape the opponent's near arm over their shoulder. The attacker then lifts the opponent into a vertical position, then falls or kneels forward, driving the opponent's face into the ground. A standing version also exists. It was invented by Arn Anderson and its kneeling variant was popularized by Sgt. Slaughter.

In the sitout version, the attacker applies a front face lock to the opponent and drapes the opponent's near arm over their shoulder. The attacker then lifts the opponent into a vertical position, and falls into a sit-out position, driving the face of the opponent into the ground. In another variation, the wrestler releases the hold just prior to the sitout position, letting the opponent's own momentum force them down head-first. Used by Jeff Hardy and Jay Briscoe.

=== Superplex ===
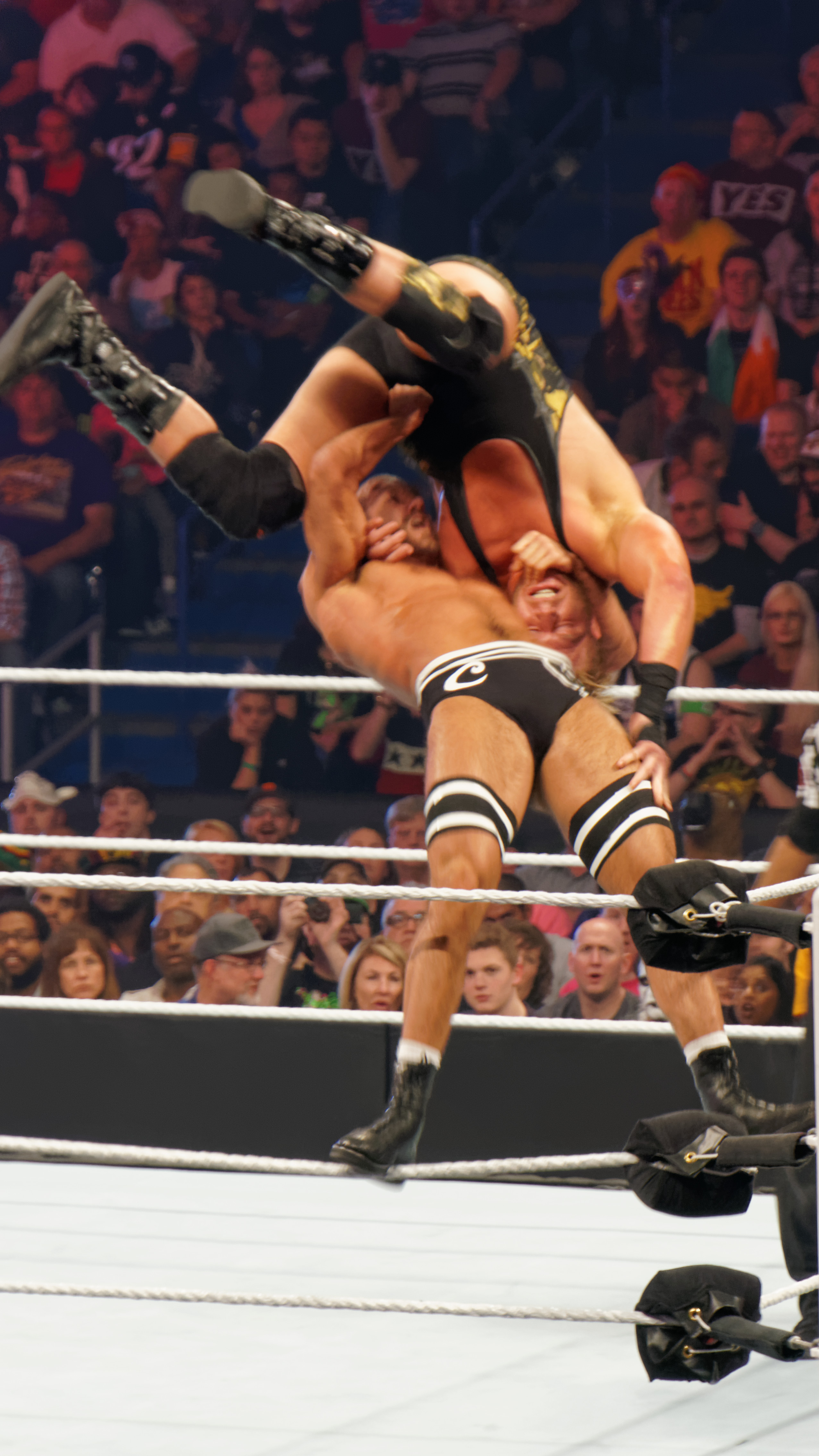
Cesaro performing a superplex on Jack Swagger

A superplex (a portmanteau of "super" and "suplex") refers to any suplex performed by an attacker standing on the second or third rope against an opponent sitting on the top rope or top turnbuckle. The most common suplex used for this top rope move is the standard vertical suplex variation (known as the suicide-plex), in which the attackers apply a front face lock to the opponent, draping the opponent's near arm over their respective shoulders, at this point the wrestler falls backwards and flips the opponent over them so they both land on their backs. This was invented by Scott Irwin, and popularized by Bob Orton Jr. when a WWF agent suggested it to him as a finish. Irwin's friend Frank Dusek claims credit for originally coining the name of the move. The Dynamite Kid was the first to do it from the topmost rope, as his finisher. Brian Cage and Cesaro version was for them to hoist their opponent from the ring apron. Larger wrestlers that have performed this, such as Brock Lesnar in 2003 on the Big Show, have broken the ring.

=== Tornado suplex ===
In a set-up similar to a tornado DDT, a wrestler goes to the top rope and applies a front facelock on their opponent from an elevated position, draping the opponent's near arm over their shoulder. The wrestler then jumps forward and swings around, but lands on their feet and performs a suplex on their opponent.

=== Vertical suplex ===
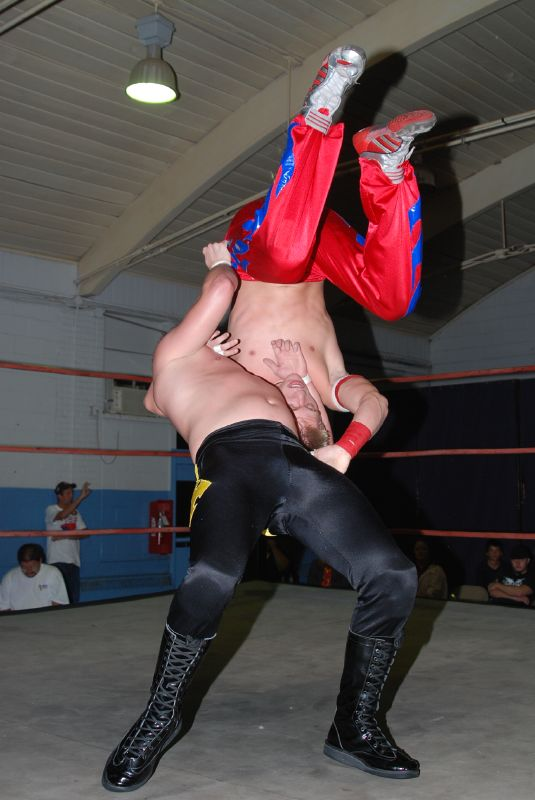
A wrestler performing a vertical suplex on an opponent

In a set-up similar to a snap suplex, the attacking wrestler applies a front face lock to the opponent, draping the opponent's near arm over their shoulder, when the opponent is in position they are lifted to an upside-down position before the attacking wrestler falls backwards slamming the opponent's back into the mat. This is also known as a front suplex or simply as a suplex.

The delayed variation of a vertical suplex, also known as the hanging suplex, standing suplex or stalling suplex, sees the attacking wrestler holds an opponent in the upside-down position at the peak of the arc for several seconds before completing the maneuver, thereby (in kayfabe) causing blood to pool into the head of the opponent. This move is a staple of larger and powerful wrestlers as it gives an aura of dominance over their opponents who can do nothing but wait to drop in the suplex. In the WWF, this variant was commonly used first by The British Bulldog, and then by Bobby Lashley.

The rotating variation of a vertical suplex, also sometimes known as the rotation suplex, rotary suplex, or twisting suplex, sees the attacking wrestler lift the opponent as in a normal vertical suplex, but turn around as they fall back to twist the opponent into the mat.

==== Drop suplex ====
This variation of a vertical suplex sees the attacking wrestler lift the opponent as in a normal vertical suplex, but then simply drop them flat to the mat instead of falling backwards with them. The move was first popularized in WCW by Kevin Nash, who began to use it instead of a standard suplex to avoid aggravating a back injury.

==== Rolling release suplex ====
This variation of a vertical suplex, also known as the X-plex as well as the Crash Landing, sees the attacker lift the opponent up with the standard suplex lift, but instead of falling backwards and having the opponent drop down onto their shoulders and back, the attacker turns the opponent and releases them from the front facelock at the apex of the lift. Both the attacker and the opponent fall forward, with the opponent landing on their neck, shoulders, and back. Used by Pete Dunne.

==== Rolling non-release suplex ====
Also known as triple rolling verticals, or triple rolling vertical suplexes, this variation of a vertical suplex sees the attacking wrestler perform a single vertical or snap suplex to the opponent, but the attacking wrestler does not release the hold, instead rolling their legs and body into a standing position to execute a second suplex, then repeats the process for a third suplex. This was popularized by WWE Hall of Famer Eddie Guerrero, who used this move, calling it the Three Amigos. Many other WWE superstars used this move to pay tribute to him, such as his nephew Chavo Guerrero, Rey Mysterio and Seth Rollins.

==== Running suplex ====
This variation is similar to a classic suplex, including the attacking wrestlers beginning with a standard front facelock, and then when they starts lifting the opponent, they make a few running steps forward while continuing the suplex rotation, slamming the opponent back-first onto the mat.

==== Snap suplex ====
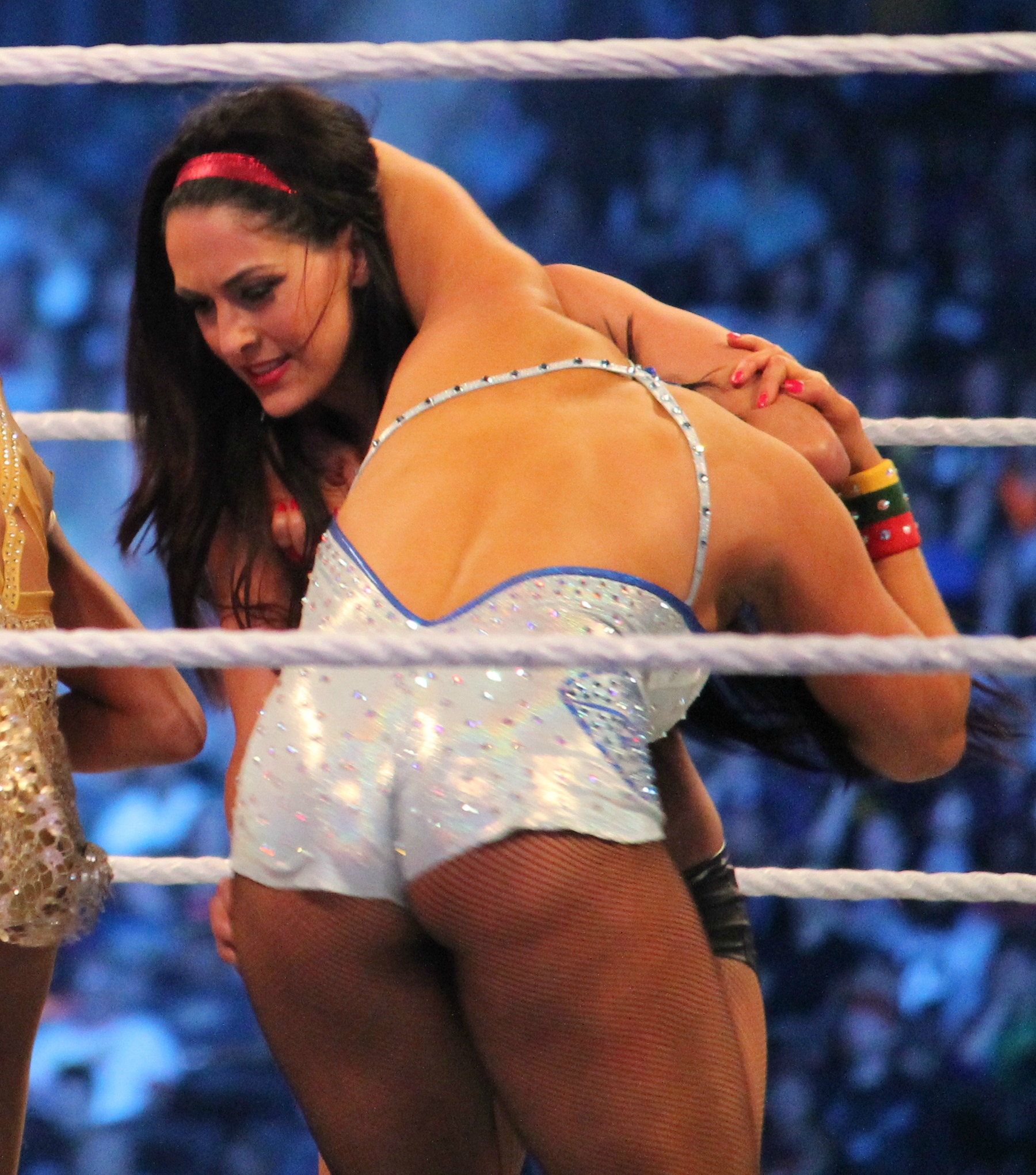
Brie Bella setting up a snap suplex on Aksana at WrestleMania XXX

This move sees the attacker apply a front face lock to their opponent, draping the opponent's near arm over their shoulder. The attacker stomps down hard and suplexes the opponent stiffly, resulting in a quicker throw. It can also be used to toss them into the turnbuckles.

==== Swinging vertical suplex ====
This variation of a vertical suplex sees a wrestler holding their opponent in a front facelock with the near arm draped over their shoulder, lifts the opponent then roll over to one side, flipping the opponent over onto their back. This move is also somewhat similar to a Whiplash Neckbreaker but without the usage of the ring ropes. Used by Dustin Rhodes as the Final Cut in WWE or the Final Reckoning in AEW.

=== Jumping suplex ===
Instead of just falling down onto their own back, the attacking wrestler jumps up and uses their momentum to drive the opponent down to the mat back first.

=== Underhook suplex ===
Also known as a half-hatch suplex. It is performed in similar fashion to a snap suplex. The wrestler applies a front facelock with one arm, but instead of draping the arm over their shoulders as seen in most suplexes, the attacker underhooks one of the opponent's arms with their other, placing their hand palm-down on the back of the opponent. The wrestler then lifts the opponent up while bridging backwards, bringing the opponent overhead and onto their back. This can be performed with or without a pinning combination in which the wrestler bridges their back and legs to hold the opponent's shoulders against the mat. It can also be done with a kick for an added snap effect.

== Belly-to-back variants ==
In these variants, the attacker stands behind their opponent and applies a hold before falling backwards, dropping the opponent on their upper back. The most common belly-to-back variants are the German suplex and the back suplex.

=== Belly-to-back suplex ===
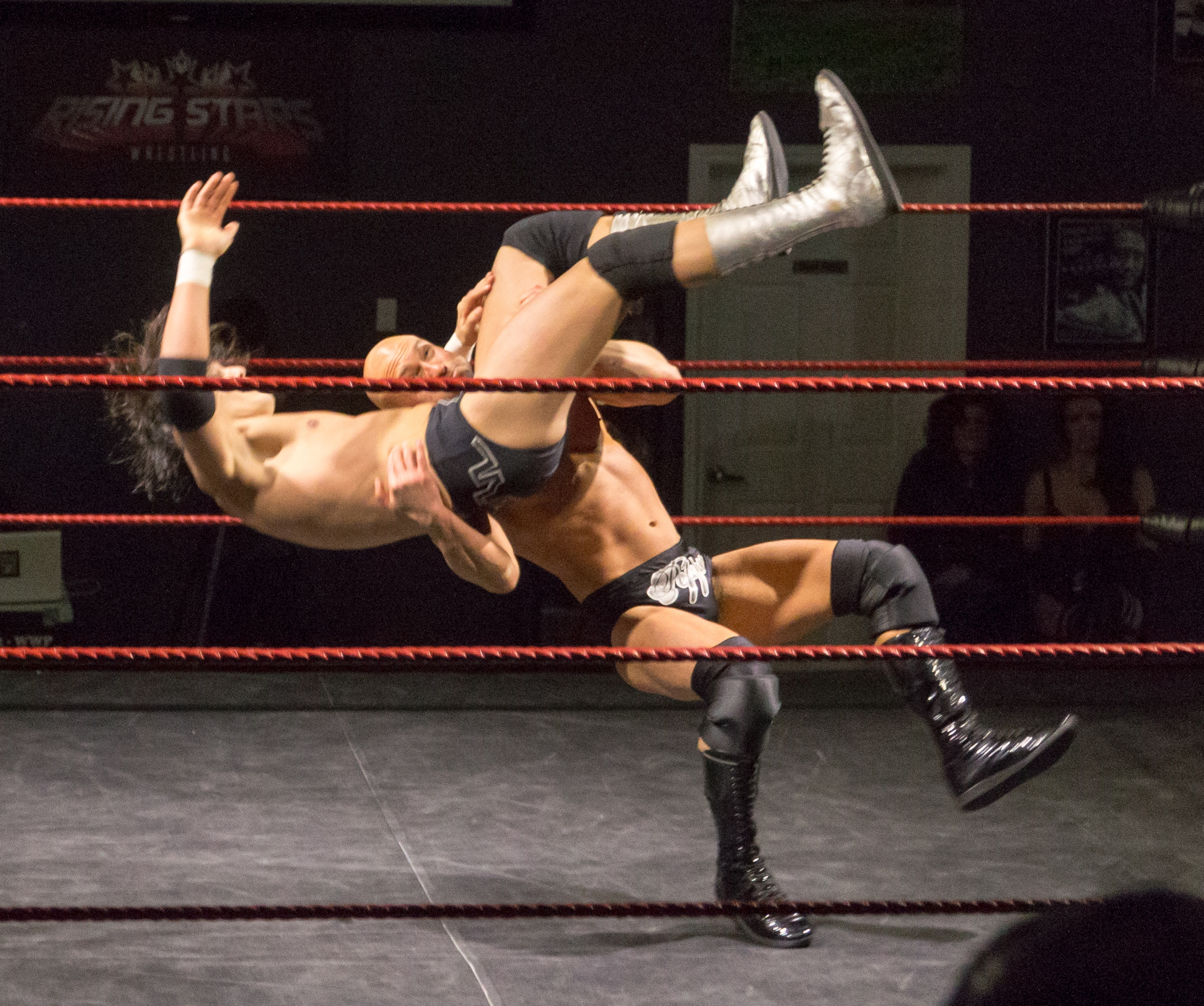
Pepper Parks (bottom) performing a belly-to-back suplex on RJ City.

For the belly-to-back suplex, the wrestler stands behind their opponent and puts their head under the arm of the opponent. The wrestler then lifts the opponent up grabbing the waist and thigh of the opponent, so the opponent is on the attacker's shoulder. The attacker finally falls backwards, dropping the opponent flat on their back. Standing release versions of this move also exist with the attacker dropping the opponent behind them or to the side back first. Another version where the opponent is thrown forwards is called an Atomic Throw.

Some wrestlers perform the back suplex into a bridging position, simultaneously arching their own back and legs to elevate themselves, gaining leverage and pinning their opponent. Very popular in Mexico's Lucha Libre, where this bridging version is known as a Puente Griego or Greek Bridge in English. In 2018, the Colombian referee Wilmar Roldan announced a campaign to introduce this variant of the suplex to international soccer.

Since the wrestler taking the move is falling backwards, the potential for injury is significant if it is not performed properly. Japanese wrestler Mitsuharu Misawa suffered a spinal injury which triggered a fatal cardiac arrest during his last match in 2009 after Akitoshi Saito gave him the belly-to-back suplex.

==== High-angle belly-to-back suplex ====
Also known as a backdrop driver/suplex, the attacking wrestler stands behind their opponent and puts their head under the arm of the opponent. They then lift the opponent up using both of their arms wrapped around the torso of the opponent. The attacker finally falls backwards to drive the opponent to the mat on their neck and shoulders. Used by "Dr. Death" Steve Williams and Takeshi Morishima. Easily confused with a Saito suplex, which engages an opponent side-on rather than from behind.

==== Leg hook belly-to-back suplex ====
Sometimes referred to as a leg lift back suplex, a leg lift backdrop, or an inverted fisherman suplex, it is applied just as a back suplex would be, except that the wrestler wraps only the near arm or no arm around the torso of their opponent. With the free arm(s), the wrestler then hoists their opponent's knees or thighs and throws them backwards in that manner. William Regal uses a bridging version called the Regal-plex while Baron Corbin and Kevin Owens uses a spinning version called the Deep Six (Corbin) and the Sidewinder Suplex (Owens). Former indie wrestler Human Tornado uses a flipping version called the DND - Dat Ninja Dead.

A wrist-clutch variation exists used by Jushin Thunder Liger as the Liger-Plex.

Another version of this move sees the attacking wrestler, while standing a facing opponent, hooks a near arm under the opponent's near armpit and around their neck with inside of the hand. Then the wrestling uses their far hand to grab the opponent's near leg and lifts if off of the ground. The wrestling then falls backwards throwing the opponent onto their head, neck, and upper back. This move best is used by both Drew Gulak calling it the Southern Lights Suplex (sometimes while holding the opponent into a bridge to attempt to score a pinfall) and Joker as the JokerPlex respectively.

==== Cobra clutch suplex ====
The attacker places the opponent in a cobra clutch hold. They then proceed to lift the opponent up and fall backwards, driving the opponent to the mat on their head.

==== Crossface chickenwing suplex ====
The wrestler stands behind the opponent. They lock one of the opponent's arms in a chickenwing, and wraps their other arm around the opponent's head. They then lift the opponent up and falls backwards, driving the opponent on to the top of their head, down to the mat.

==== Crotch clutch suplex ====
This move involves the attacking wrestler approaching an opponent from behind, reaching down and grasping their crotch with both forearms, with hands together and facing upwards into their groin, and lifting him overhead into a belly-to-back release suplex. The opponent reacts to both the suplex and being grabbed and lifted by their crotch, to humorous effect.

==== Dragon suplex ====
Invented by Tatsumi Fujinami, this belly-to-back suplex variation sees the wrestler apply a full nelson and then bridge their back, lifting the opponent over him and onto their shoulders down to the mat. The wrestler keeps their back arched and the hold applied, pinning the opponent's shoulders down to the mat. The wrestler may also release the opponent mid-arch, throwing them down to the mat shoulders and neck first, in a variation known as release dragon suplex.

==== Electric chair suplex ====
Also known as an electric chair slam. The wrestler lifts the opponent on their shoulders in an electric chair sitting position and then bridges their back, slamming the opponent down to the mat shoulder and upper back first.

==== German suplex ====
German suplex animation

Formally known as a reverse gutwrench suplex or waist-lock belly-to-back suplex, and abbreviated as a German, this move sees the wrestler stand behind the opponent, grab them around their waist, lift them up, and fall backwards while bridging their back and legs, slamming the opponent down to the mat shoulder and upper back first. The wrestler keeps the waistlock and continues bridging with their back and legs, pinning the opponent's shoulders down against the mat. The regular pinning variation can be referred to as the German suplex pin or German suplex hold. The wrestler can also release the opponent in mid arch, which is referred to as a release German suplex. The move is named after the innovator of the bridging version of the move, Karl Gotch, who had originally coined the move to be known as the Atomic suplex, but had to be scrapped by Japanese promoters due to the taboo nature of the Japanese atomic bombings post-Second World War. The actual suplex itself was said to have been innovated by wrestlers from Finland.

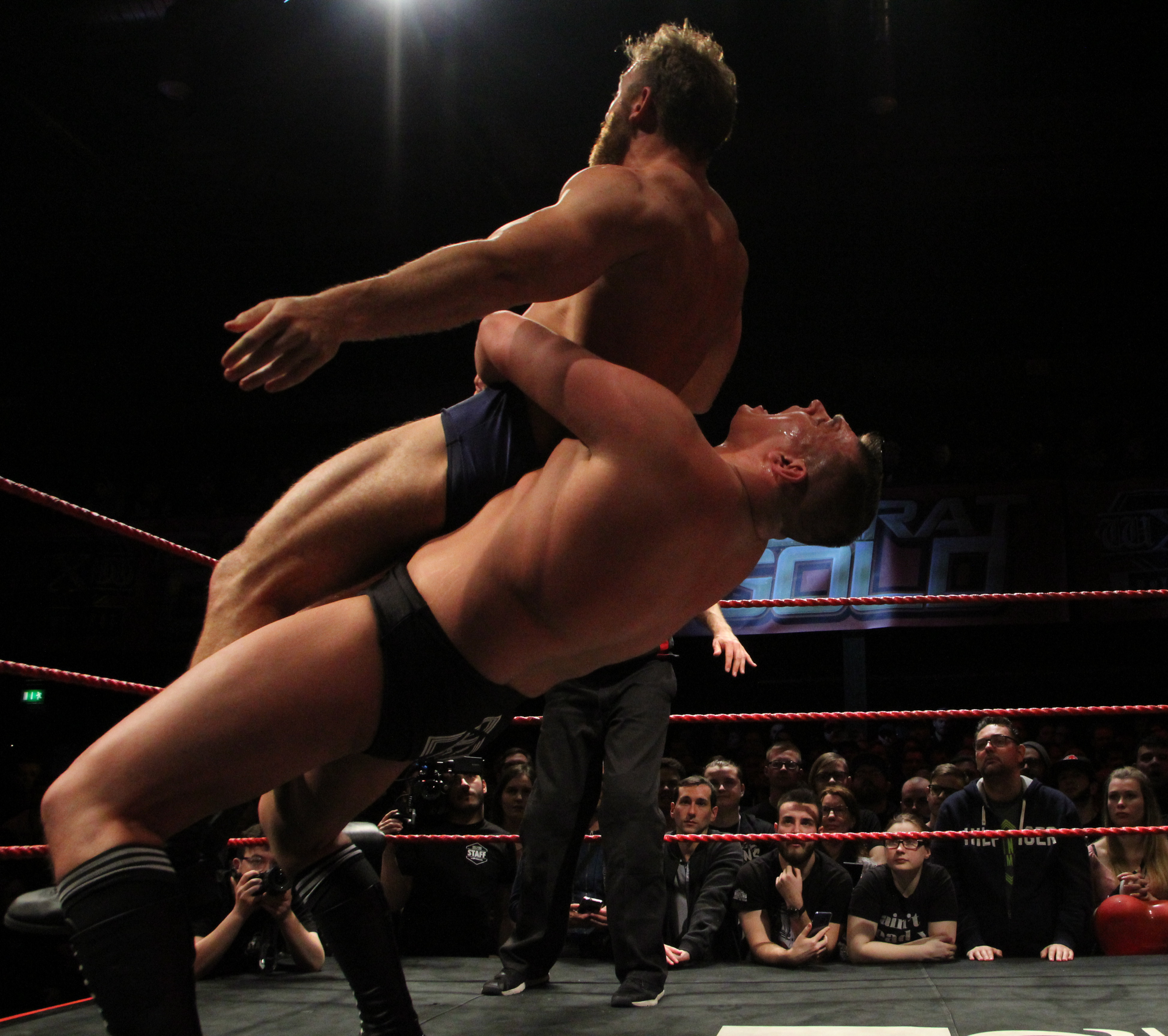
Walter performing a German suplex on Timothy Thatcher

Sometimes, rather than bridging for a pin, the wrestler may roll himself into another position to perform the move again, often referred to as multiple, rolling, or non-release German suplexes, in which the attacking wrestler performs a German suplex, then rolls their legs to get back into a standing position, but does not let the opponent go to do so. The attacking wrestler then repeats this numerous times, most commonly three, but sometimes up to eight or more. The WWE superstar that uses the maneuver most commonly is Brock Lesnar, although it has also been used by Chris Benoit, Kurt Angle, and others in the past. This move is confusing referred by some color commentators on television as a belly-to-back suplex.

A delayed, high-angle bridging variant of the standard German suplex, which targets the opponent's head and neck more than the shoulders or upper back, was innovated by Karl Gotch. It is known commonly as a German suplex hold, but is also known as an Everest German Suplex (in the case of Yoshihiro Takayama) or a Mount Fuji Suplex (in the case of Manabu Nakanishi) in reference to heights of these mountains.

A Rebound German suplex sees the wrestler, while standing behind an opponent, shoves them forwards into the corner turnbuckles or ring ropes with enough force to cause them recoil backwards to then grab them around their waist, lift them up, and fall backwards while bridging their back and legs, slamming the opponent down to the mat shoulder and upper back first. A bridge can also be applied to attempt to score a pinfall. The move can also be used a counter against a charging opponent with the wrestler moving off to one's side allowing the opponent hit the turnbuckles or ropes causing them to stumble backwards to which the throw can be performed. Another version of this move, known as a 21 plex and innovated by Mexican luchador Bandido, begins with the opponent standing facing the ropes, while hunched over grabbing the second rope trying to catch their breath or recovering from an attack. They then charge towards the opponent from behind, then leaps into the air performing a front flip while applying a rear waist lock tucking their head forwards and to either side to allow themself clearance to roll onto the standing opponent's back. They use the momentum placing their legs on the top rope for leverage to bounce upwards and roll backwards to land on their feet to perform the German suplex.

Another version of this move called a Rebound O'Connor roll German suplex sees the wrestler standing behind the opponent. After applying a rear waistlock, the attacking wrestler then charges forwards propelling the opponent chest first into the turnbuckles or ropes using the momentum from the collision to roll backwards, while maintaining the waistlock, with enough force to roll backwards over the opponent who were on their shoulders with the attacking wrestler rolling on top of their legs to both end up in a standing position to which the wrestler performs the German suplex. A bridging version of this move is the most common. An alternative name for this move is known as the Chaos Theory as popularized by retired English wrestler Douglas Williams as a finisher and is currently being used by WWE wrestler Chad Gable also as a finisher.

==== Straight jacket suplex ====
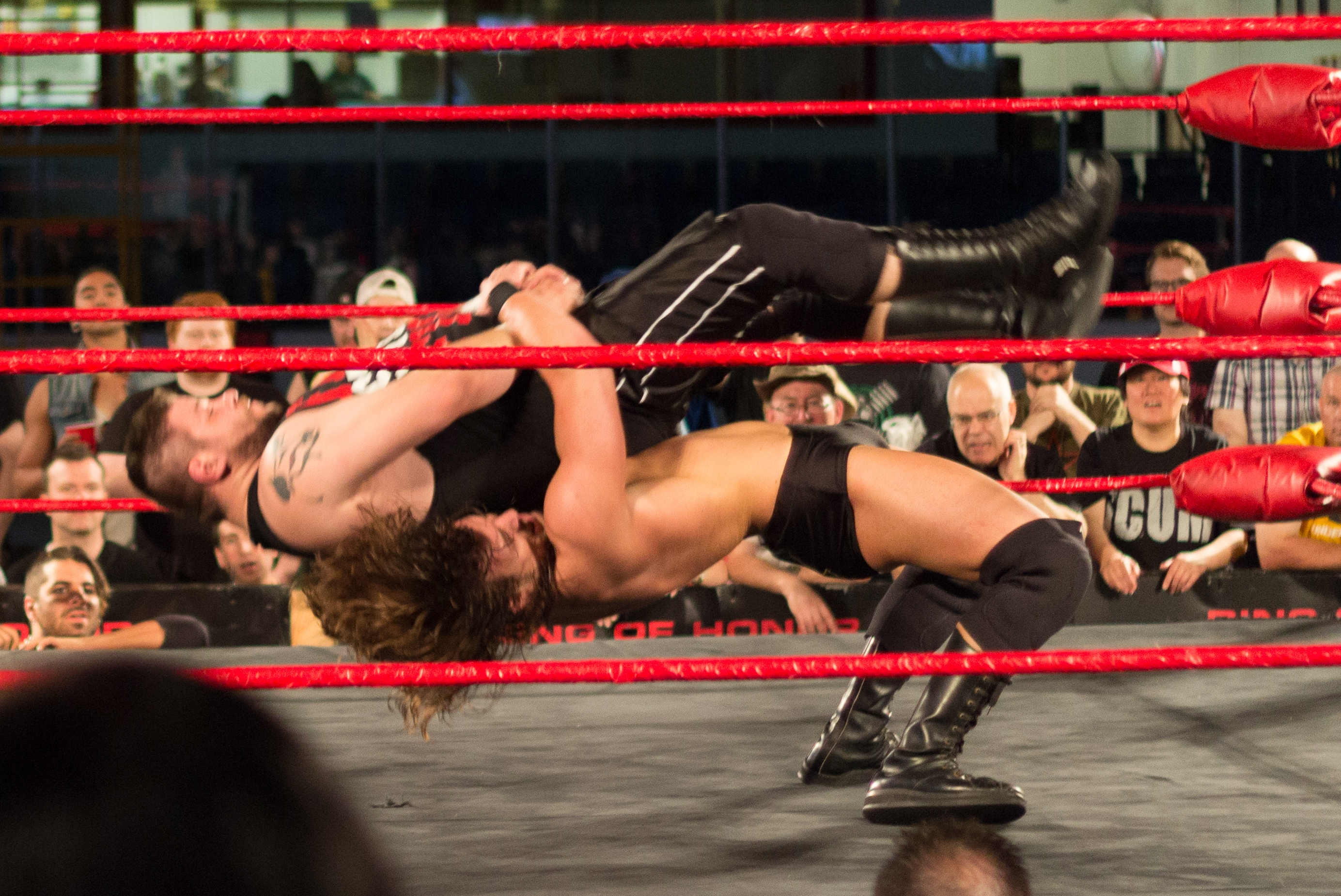
Adam Cole performing a straight jacket suplex on Kevin Steen

The straight jacket suplex or package German suplex has the attacker trapping the opponent's arms while performing a German suplex. Variants such as the cross-arm suplex or X-Plex see the opponent's arms crossed across their chest and held by the attacker. The wrestler then uses the crossed arms as leverage to aid in lifting the opponent up while falling backwards to throw the opponent as in a German suplex.

==== Half and half suplex ====
This is a suplex variation in which the wrestler, while standing behind the opponent, places one arm in a Half nelson and the other arm in a chickenwing. The wrestler then proceeds to fall backwards while lifting the opponent overhead in the hold and driving them into the mat behind them. This move is referred to as a half and half suplex as it is a combination of a half nelson suplex and a tiger suplex. The move can be either released or brought into a pin. This variation is often used by Sami Zayn.

==== Half nelson suplex ====
This is a version of a German suplex where the attacker stands behind the opponent, facing the same direction. The attacker uses one hand to apply a half nelson hold and wraps the other hand around the opponent's waist. The attacker then lifts the opponent up and falls backwards, dropping the opponent on their head, neck, or shoulders. The move can be either released or brought into a pin.

==== Pumphandle suplex ====
The wrestler stands behind the opponent and bends him forward. One of the opponent's arms is pulled back between their legs and held, while the opponent's other arm is hooked by the attacker maneuvering their arm around in front of the opponent's shoulder (as in a pumphandle) and securing it behind the head (a quarter-nelson). The attacker then lifts their opponent up, over their head and falls backwards to slam the opponent against the mat back-first.

There are many variations of the pumphandle suplex, including the maintaining of the grip in order to land the opponent on the mat face-first, or inverting the opponent's body position and securing the opponent's free arm using a half-nelson grip instead of the normal quarter-nelson. STARDOM wrestler Momo Watanabe used the pumphandle half-nelson as the Peach Sunrise. AEW commentator and former wrestler Excalibur also used the move as the Galactica Phantom.

==== Sleeper suplex ====
The attacker places the opponent in a sleeper hold and then hooks one of the opponents arms with their free arm. The attacker then lifts the opponent up and falls backwards, driving the opponent on their head. A slight variation sees the attacker apply a half nelson choke instead of the sleeper hold before performing the suplex. Jay White uses this move.

==== Katahajime suplex ====
The attacker stands behind the opponent, facing the same direction. The wrestler puts one arm in a half nelson and the other hand around the neck in front of the opponent, like in a sleeper. The hand in front of the neck is locked with the other hand at the wrist. With the grip secure, the attacker then lifts the opponent up and falls backwards, dropping the opponent on their head, neck, or shoulders. The move can end in a release or bridging position. This was invented by Tazz as the Tazmission-plex.

==== Three-quarter nelson suplex ====
Invented by Mitsuharu Misawa. The attacker places their opponent in three-quarter nelson before lifting them and falling backwards, dropping them on their head or neck. It is also known as the Tiger Suplex '85, due to its association with an August 1985 match between Mitsuharu Misawa, then working as the second incarnation of Tiger Mask, and Kuniaki Kobayashi.

==== Tiger suplex ====
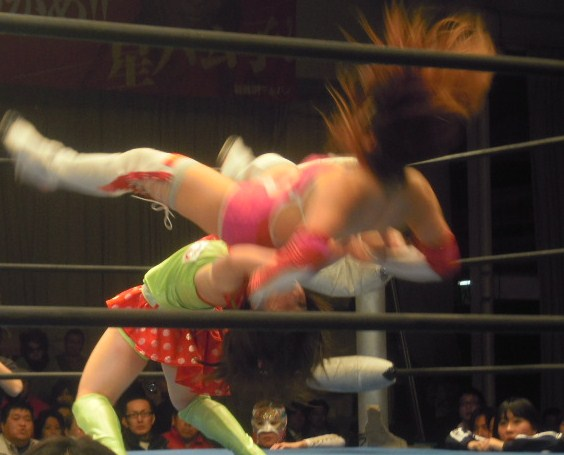
Tsukushi performing a tiger suplex on Sendai Sachiko.

Innovated by the original Tiger Mask (Satoru Sayama), this move sees the wrestler standing behind their opponent, hooks both of the opponent's arms from the sides, and places their hands palm down flat against the opponent's upper back. The wrestler then lifts the opponent up and falls backwards, arching their back and legs and then slamming the opponent down to the mat shoulder and neck first. Like other suplex variations, this move can either end in a bridging pin or be released upon execution. A Wrist-Clutch variation was invented by Tiger Mask IV (Yoshihiro Yamazaki), called Tiger Suplex '09, because he invented it in 2009.

==== Wheelbarrow suplex ====
This move is performed when a wrestler wraps a forward-facing opponent's legs around their waist, in a wheelbarrow hold, from either standing behind an opponent who is laying face-first on the mat or by catching a charging opponent before then applying a waistlock to lift the opponent up off the ground into the air, then the attacking wrestler would continue lifting the opponent over their while falling backwards to hit belly-to-back suplex.

== Belly-to-belly variants ==
In these suplexes, the wrestlers begin by facing each other. The attacker then applies a bodylock before falling backwards and flipping the opponent onto their back and down on the mat.

=== Belly-to-belly suplex ===
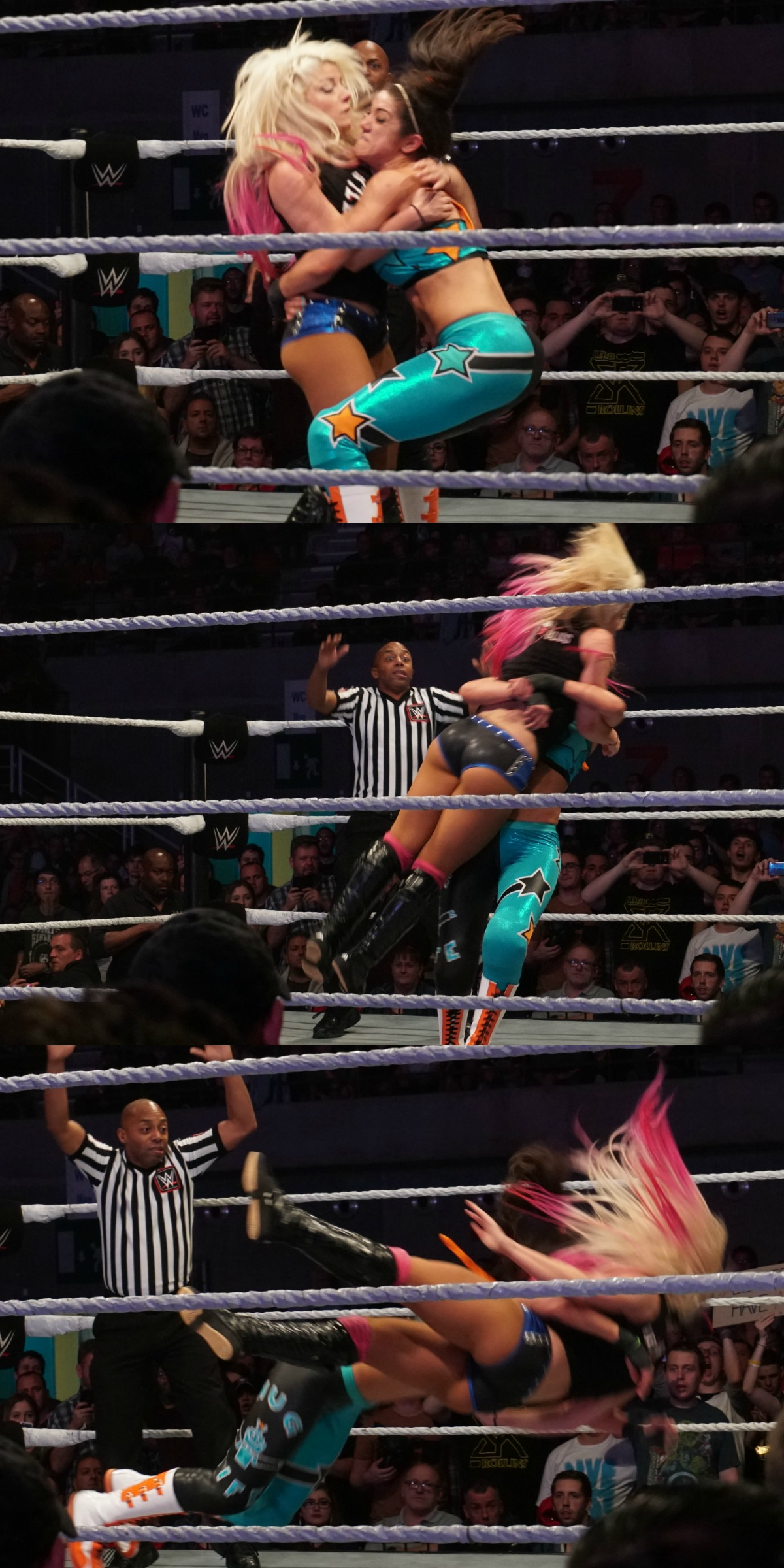
Bayley performs a Bayley-to-belly suplex (belly-to-belly suplex) on Alexa Bliss

The wrestler wraps their arms around the opponent in a waistlock or a bodylock position and flips them over by violently bridging their own body so the opponent lands on their back. This can be done either overhead or to the side. Used by Bayley as the Bayley to Belly.

==== Side belly-to-belly suplex ====
For a side belly-to-belly suplex, the attacker usually holds on to the opponent for the duration of the move.

=== Overhead belly-to-belly suplex ===
For the overhead belly-to-belly suplex, the attacker usually executes an overhead throw and lets go of the opponent. It can also be performed in a "snap" fashion, where the attacker stomps down hard and suplexes the opponent stiffly, resulting in a quicker throw.

==== Capture suplex ====
The attacker stands facing a standing opponent. The attacker then catches one leg of the opponent and pulls the opponent towards them so that they are face-to-face, with the attacker reaching under the opponent's leg and hooking it. The attacker then uses their free arm to reach behind the neck of the opponent and take hold of them. The attacker then quickly bridges backwards and releases the opponent, throwing them overhead, or turns 180° while slamming the opponent down to the mat. This move can be used to counter a kick. The move is also known as the head and leg suplex, and can be seen as a variation of the head and arm suplex.

==== Butterfly suplex ====
Also known as double arm suplex, reverse nelson suplex, double axe handle suplex, and double underhook suplex, the wrestler and opponent face each other, the opponent bent forward. The wrestler hooks the opponent's arms back in a Double Underhook, placing their forearms in the crooks of the opponent's elbows, with their hands on top of the opponent's back in a butcher's grip. The wrestler then lifts the opponent into an upside-down vertical position and falls back, shifting the opponent to one side as the opponent flips over. The wrestler executing the suplex may release the reverse nelson hold during the throw, or can maintain the grip and attempt a bridging pin or submission hold transition upon impact. Sara Del Rey version was for her to apply a butterfly hold before executing the suplex, dubbed the Royal Butterfly. Bryan Danielson innovated another variation, where he executed the double underhook suplex, before dropping their opponent's into a cross armbreaker, dubbed the Danielson Special. This move was also used by the late wrestlers Billy Robinson and Andre the Giant.

==== Exploder suplex ====
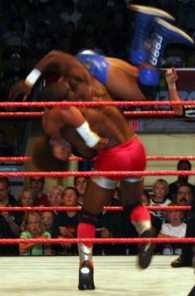
Shelton Benjamin hits a variant of the T-Bone suplex, with a powerslam pin, on Carlito.

Also known as T-bone suplex. The attacker stands facing their opponent and positions himself under one of the opponent's arms and wraps their arm around the opponent's neck and back (this position is similar to that of a side slam) and then grabs the leg of the opponent and tosses him backwards, over the attacker's head. Several other variations exist, such as an inverted variant, commonly used by Shinsuke Nakamura, the wrist-clutch exploder suplex, innovated by Jun Akiyama who called it the Exploder '98, and the bridging exploder suplex invented by Takashi Iizuka (also called Blizzard Suplex). The move is used by Taz and Becky Lynch as the Tazplex and Bexploder respectively.

==== Head-and-arm suplex ====
Also called a gargoyle suplex, the move is a variation of the traditional overhead belly-to-belly suplex in which the wrestler, standing face-to-face with their opponent, clutches their hands together having firmly encircled the opponent's head and one arm. This grip, as opposed to the waistlock of a normal belly-to-belly, is then used to hoist the opponent in the overhead arching throw.

==== Northern Lights suplex ====
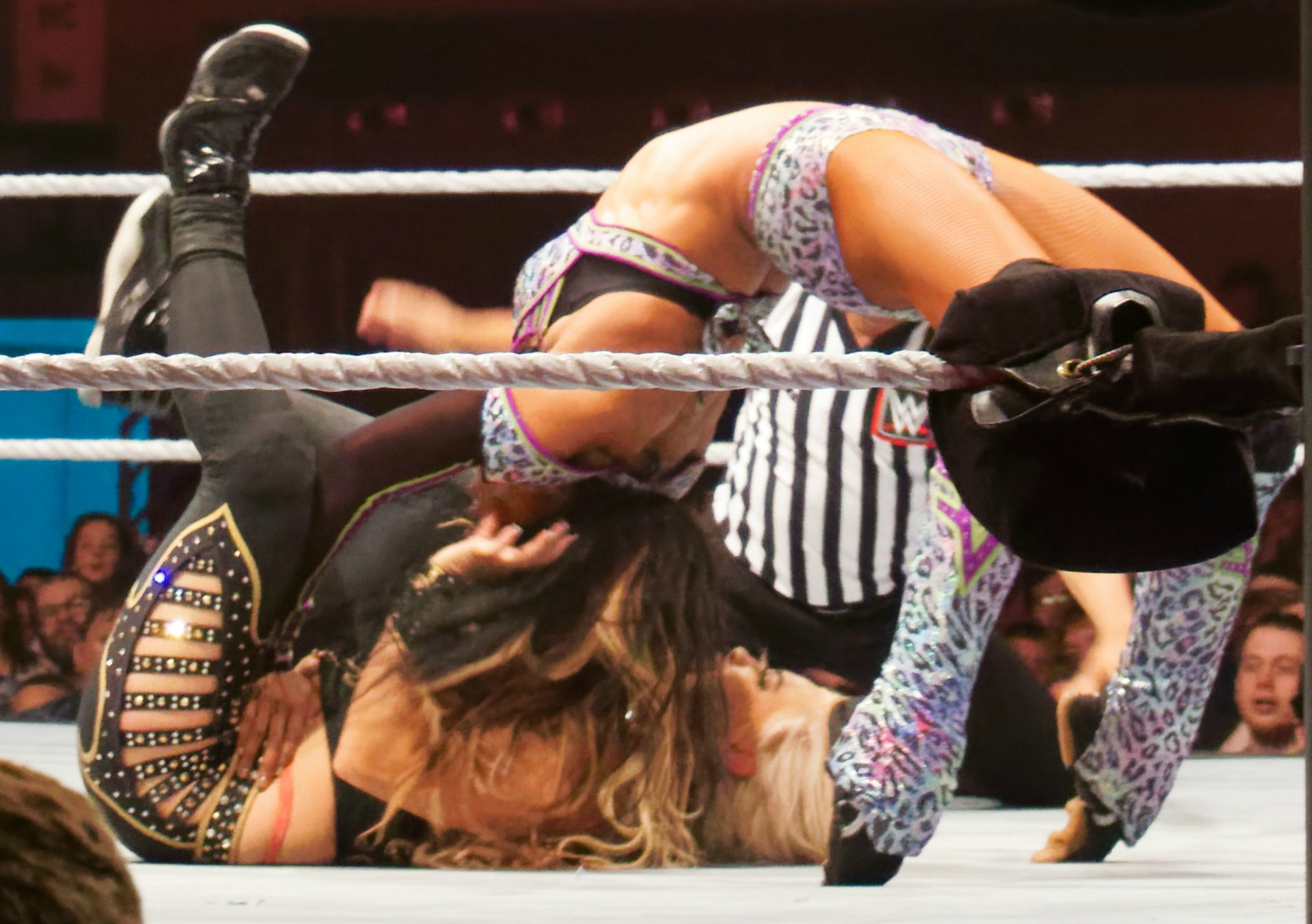
Alicia Fox performs a bridging Northern Lights suplex on Dana Brooke

Invented by Hiroshi Hase. The attacking wrestler puts their head under the arm of the opponent, wraps their arms around the waist of the opponent and flips them backwards. This suplex can either be released or bridged into a pin. The wrestler can also float over into another Northern Lights suplex.

==== Table top suplex ====
Also known as a fallaway slam, the wrestler lifts the opponent up so the opponent is horizontal across the wrestler's body then falls backward, throwing the opponent over their head down to the mat back-first. This slam can be either bridged into a pin, or the wrestler can float over into another fallaway slam. This move is sometimes used as a continuation move from catching the opponent's high-cross body, to emphasize the wrestler's strength.

==== Trapping suplex ====
Also known as a Double arm locksault or a Front salto, this is when a wrestler holds both the opponent's arms under their own (known as overhooks in mixed martial arts and amateur wrestling, as the arms loop under the opponent's arms from above) with the hands connected below the opponent's triceps, from here the opponent is left secure and unable to counter or move away from the attacker while their delivers a belly-to-belly throw flipping the opponent overhead in the normal belly-to-belly motion. In amateur wrestling and other contact-sports, the trapping suplex is called the Suicide throw, a Salto, or a Side salto. It is done slightly differently, usually the opponent is tossed to the side and lands on their back.

This move consists of one wrestler picking up their opponent off the ground (or mat) and then using a large portion of their own body weight to drive the opponent down on the mat. They begin face-to-face, then the attacker forces the opponent's head down and locks the opponent's arm around it.

== Side variants ==
In the side variants the attacker stands to the side of their opponent and applies a hold before falling backwards to slam the opponent to the mat. The most common is the Saito suplex.

=== Gutwrench suplex ===
This throw involves a wrestler standing on one side of a prone opponent locking both arms around the opponent's waist near arm in front of the opponent and far arm behind, and lifting him/her up to slam him/her over back-first down to the mat. An inverted version also exists.

==== Karelin Lift ====
A gutwrench suplex which begins with the opponent laying face down on the mat. The wrestler locks their arms around the opponent's waist and stands up, lifting the opponent. They then throw the opponent to their side, dropping them to the mat up on to their upper shoulders, back, and neck or face down on their chest. Named after the Greco-Roman wrestler Alexander Karelin, who is famous for using the move.

AEW wrestler Claudio Castagnoli has used two separate versions of this move. The first saw him lifting their opponents from the side, stands up, turns the opponent upside down to fall into a sitting position to drop them on their neck or head to either side of him. He called this the Lasartesse Lift (named after fellow Swiss wrestler Rene Lasartesse) and used this as a finisher in 2007 while on the independent circuit. Currently, the second version sees him throwing the opponent flat onto their back and uses this as a signature move while sometimes maintaining the hold to roll into a standing position to throw them two more times.

=== Saito suplex ===
Often called a backdrop suplex/driver, due to the landing’s visual similarity to a high-angle belly-to-back suplex. The initiation, however, is subtly different: the attacker stands directly facing one of their opponent's sides (or at an angle between their back and side - hence the confusion). They place the opponent's near arm over their shoulder, grab a waistlock, and then lift the opponent up while falling backwards, causing the opponent to land on their neck and shoulders. The difference in grip & lift allows the opponent more room to land on their shoulders, and thus tends to look less hazardous than a true Backdrop Driver. This move was innovated by the late Japanese wrestler Masa Saito.

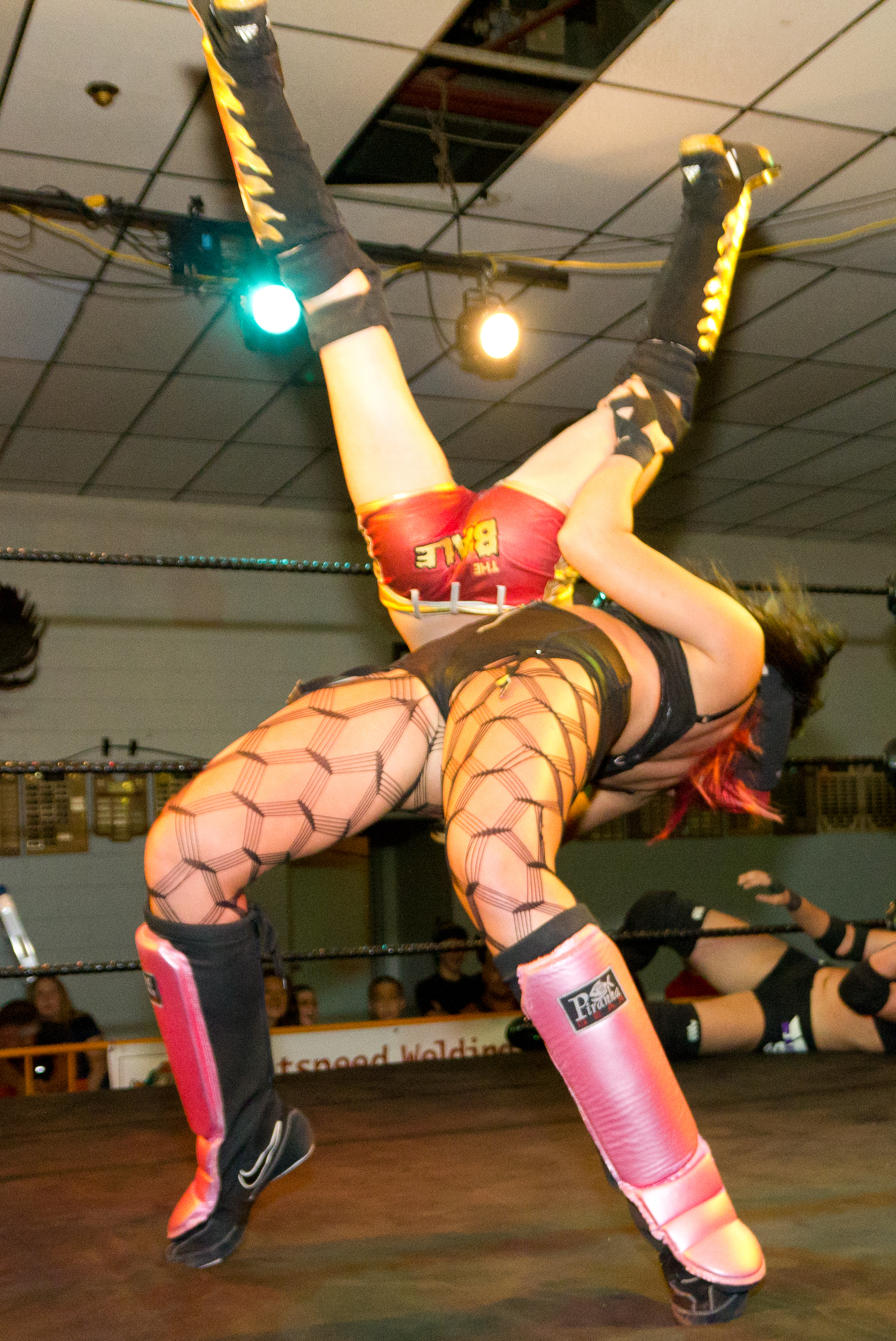
Sienna performing a Leg-hook Saito suplex

There is also a leg-hook variation where the attacker stands behind and to one side of the opponent. The attacker wraps one arm around the waist of the opponent and grabs the back of the opponent's near leg with their other arm. The attacker then lifts the opponent on to their shoulder and then falls backwards, driving the opponent into the mat at a high angle. This was used by Karrion Kross as the Doomsday Saito. Shawn Michaels used a leg-hook version in the early 90's as the Teardrop Suplex.

=== Schoolboy suplex ===
Also known as a schoolboy-plex, the moves sees the attacking wrestler drop down behind the opponent and put one arm up between the opponent's legs to pull the opponent over the attacking wrestler so that they fall flat on their back. The wrestler then stands up to use their free underhand to grab, around the side of the opponent's near thigh to lift them off of the ground off their back. The wrestler, while turning the opponent nearly 90 degrees, falls backwards to toss the opponent back first onto the ground. It's possible for the wrestler, while holding onto the opponent, to apply a bridge. Former wrestler Bob Backlund used this move as a signature mostly in Japan. WWE wrestler Andrade Almas used this move as a finisher dubbed the Sombra Driver / Brillante Driver / Shadow Driver. Braun Strowman has also used this move.

=== Side suplex ===
See Ura-nage.

This move is also known as a sambo suplex or side suplex. To perform it, the wrestler stands face-to-face with the opponent, slightly to their side. The wrestler either reaches across the opponent's chest and around their neck with their near arm and locks both hands behind the opponent's shoulders or just locks both hands behind the opponent's waist. The wrestler then simultaneously lifts the opponent up, twists 180° and falls backwards, bringing the opponent over them and slamming the opponent back-first on the mat.

The name ura-nage (or uranage) comes from a Judo throw which translated directly from Japanese, means "throw to behind/back" and is commonly (albeit incorrectly) used to refer to a regular side slam in pro wrestling. The Judo ura-nage throw more closely resembles a saito suplex in execution.

==== Cravate suplex ====
This sees a wrestler lock their opponent in a cravate and pull down with their arms so that the opponent is forced to bend over. The wrestler then positions the opponent so that they are facing across the body of the wrestler and with their head in front of the wrestlers chest while still standing. The wrestler then falls backwards, pulling upwards with the cravate and forcing the opponent off their feet into the air and over the wrestler, landing on their neck and shoulders. Invented by Chris Hero.

== Inverted facelock variants ==
In these suplexes, an attacker begins by facing the back of an opponent and applying an inverted facelock before executing a throw. In most, the opponent is suspended upside-down during part of the move.

=== Inverted suplex ===
Also known as a reverse suplex, this move sees the attacker stands behind an opponent and applies an inverted facelock with one arm, and uses the other arm to aid in elevating the opponent so that he/she is lifted up and held upside-down before the attacker falls to their back driving the opponent down to the mat face first, behind the attacker.

== In other sports ==
Suplex tackles in gridiron football are not allowed and may be subject to penalties, fines, and ejections.

== See also ==
- Professional wrestling throws
