= Crabwalk (disambiguation) =

Crabwalk is a 2002 novel by Danzig-born German author Günter Grass.

Crabwalk or crab walk may also refer to:

- Crab walk, the typical locomotion of a crab
- Crab walk or crab crawl, used in crawl soccer
- "Crabwalk", a song by British musical duo Everything but the Girl from the 1984 album Eden
- Crab Walk, a special steering mode on the GMC Hummer EV

== See also ==
- Sidle (disambiguation)
