= Crawling (human) =

Moving along the ground on hands and knees

Stages of crawling in a baby (1 minute video)
- https://www.youtube.com/watch?v=f3xWaOkXCSQ

A man crawling

Crawling or quadrupedal movement is a method of human locomotion that makes use of all four limbs. It is one of the earliest gaits learned by human infants, and has similar features to four-limbed movement in other primates and in non-primate quadrupeds.

== When crawls are used ==
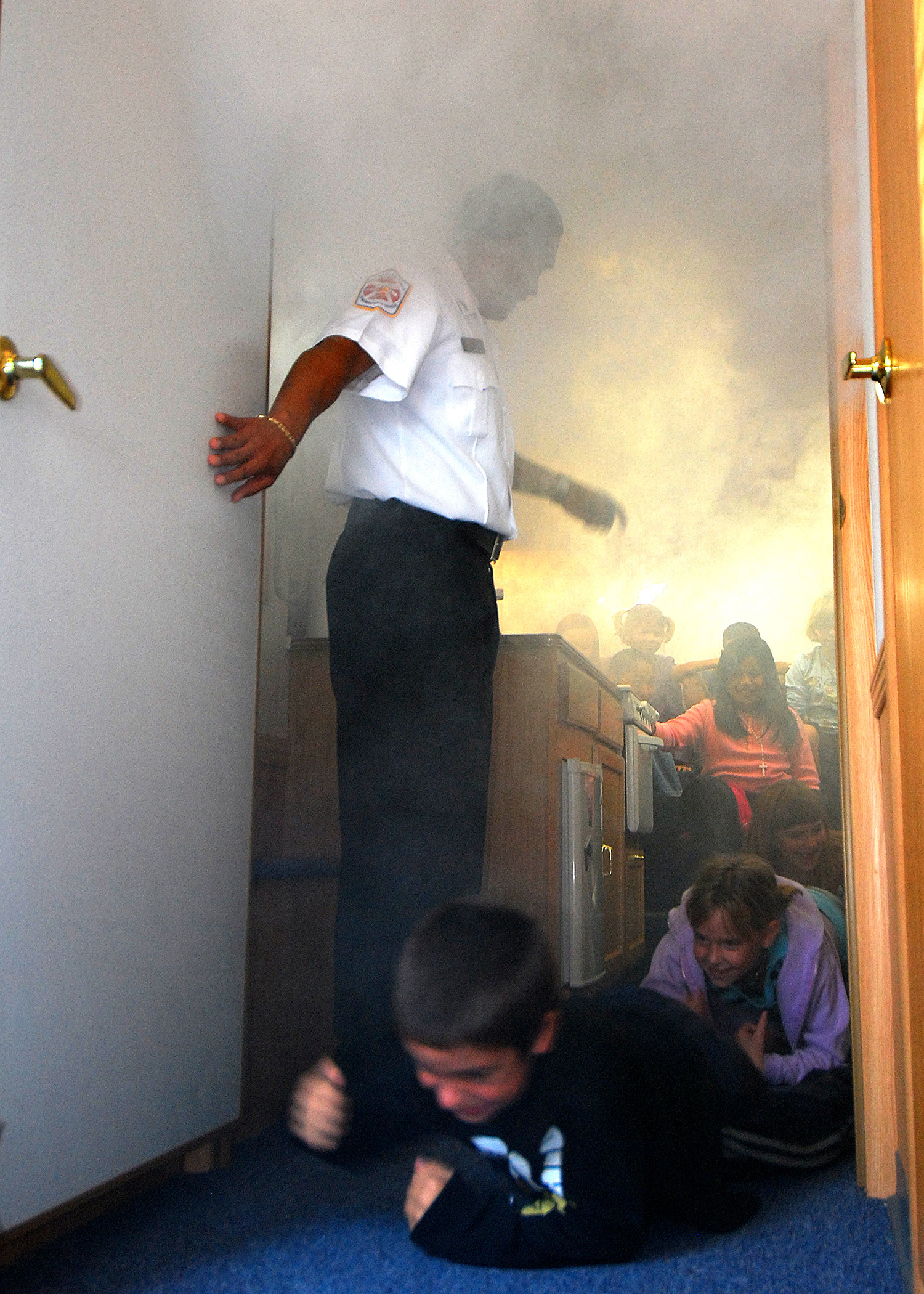
Children crawling on the ground during a fire drill in Italy.

Crawling is used mainly:

- When a person cannot yet walk because of being an infant
- When a person cannot walk due to disability, being wounded, sick, or drunk
- In very low places (caves, under a table, in a mine, etc.). Sometimes underground miners need to crawl long distances during their work
- When searching for something on the ground
- To get down to the ground in gardening, for maintenance or other work-related purposes which require a good reach on the ground
- For stealth (camouflage and quietness)
- To avoid being hit by gunfire
- To lower the field of vision
- As a form of exercise
- As a token of submission
- For fun or comical purposes
- To reduce the risk of smoke inhalation during a fire

== In infants ==
A 10-month-old baby crawling by kneeling

Infants sometimes "crawl" with their stomachs on the ground as early as 3 months, but this crawling is infrequent with the baby remaining stationary most of the time. True crawling with the stomach off the ground and the baby frequently on the move usually develops between 7 and 11 months of age and lasts anywhere from a week to 4 months before the child switches to walking. Even after taking their first unaided steps, most babies still crawl part of the time until they have mastered walking. While crawling, infants gradually practice standing, at first by using people or objects for support and, later, without support. Crawling babies are notorious for getting into trouble, so parents are often advised to childproof their house before a baby reaches crawling age.

Though crawling is an important developmental milestone in children, it is not necessary for healthy development. Some babies skip crawling and go directly to walking. Others "bottom shuffle" instead of crawling (sometimes referred to as "bum-shuffling", or "scooting"). Bottom-shuffling babies sit on their bottoms and push themselves forward using their legs, and sometimes their hands, often in specially reinforced trousers. Babies that bottom-shuffle tend to walk later than babies that crawl.

Whether infants crawl is also culturally determined. European parents in previous centuries discouraged it as being too animal-like. They kept their children in long dresses and other clothes that made crawling difficult or impossible. Some cultures consider it to be dirty and dangerous.

== Types of crawls ==
=== Standard crawl ===
Crawling is a specific four-beat gait involving the hands and knees. A typical crawl is left-hand, right-knee, right-hand, left-knee, or a hand, the diagonal knee, the other hand then its diagonal knee. This is the first gait most humans learn, and is mainly used during early childhood, or when looking for something on the floor or under low relief. It can be used to move with a lower silhouette, but there are better crawls for that purpose. This is the most natural of the crawls and is the one that requires the least effort.

=== Bear crawl ===
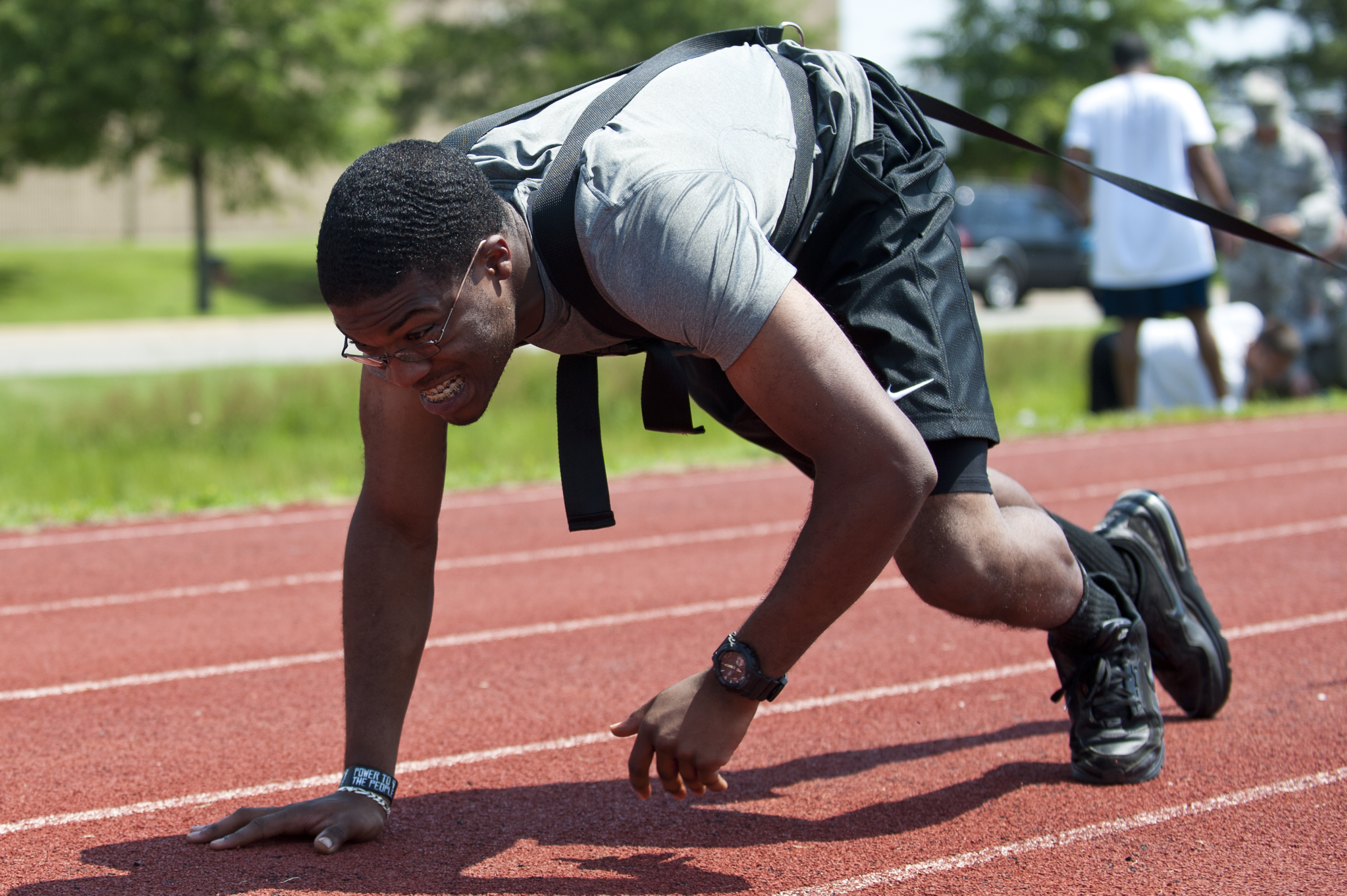
US Airman performs a bear crawl

The bear crawl is almost identical to the standard crawl, but the feet are used instead of the knees, which creates an arched or squatted body posture. This works as a faster crawl but requires more effort to maintain.

=== Bridge walk ===
This involves holding a gymnastic bridge and making small steps with the arms and legs. It is similar to a crab walk in that the body locomotes in a supine posture, but the arms are in shoulder flexion alongside the head.

Because of its unusual appearance, bridgewalking has been used in several horror films to suggest the demonic possession of a character. These have included The Exorcist and The Unborn. Wrestler Bray Wyatt does this.

=== Commando crawl ===
Also known as "creeping", this is often a baby's first form of locomotion. At the same time the baby develops arm strength to lift their chests, thereby helping forward momentum.

=== Crab crawl ===
The crab crawl is used in crab soccer. It starts by sitting down with the feet and hands flat on the ground, the hips are then raised off the ground and the chest faces the sky. It is similar to a bridge walk in that both have quadrupedal locomotion with a supine torso, but here the arms are held behind the torso, with the shoulder joint being in hyperextension. Due to its inefficiency, it is more commonly used as a form of exercise than actual transportation. Crabwalking builds triceps endurance and arm and leg strength, and is a recommended exercise of various school athletic departments and soccer organizations, such as USA football.

The crab crawl is also useful for descending steep slopes with poor traction. Its feet-first orientation ensures a low center of mass to prevent tumbling, while the inverted posture allows one to see where they're going.

=== Leopard crawl/high crawl ===
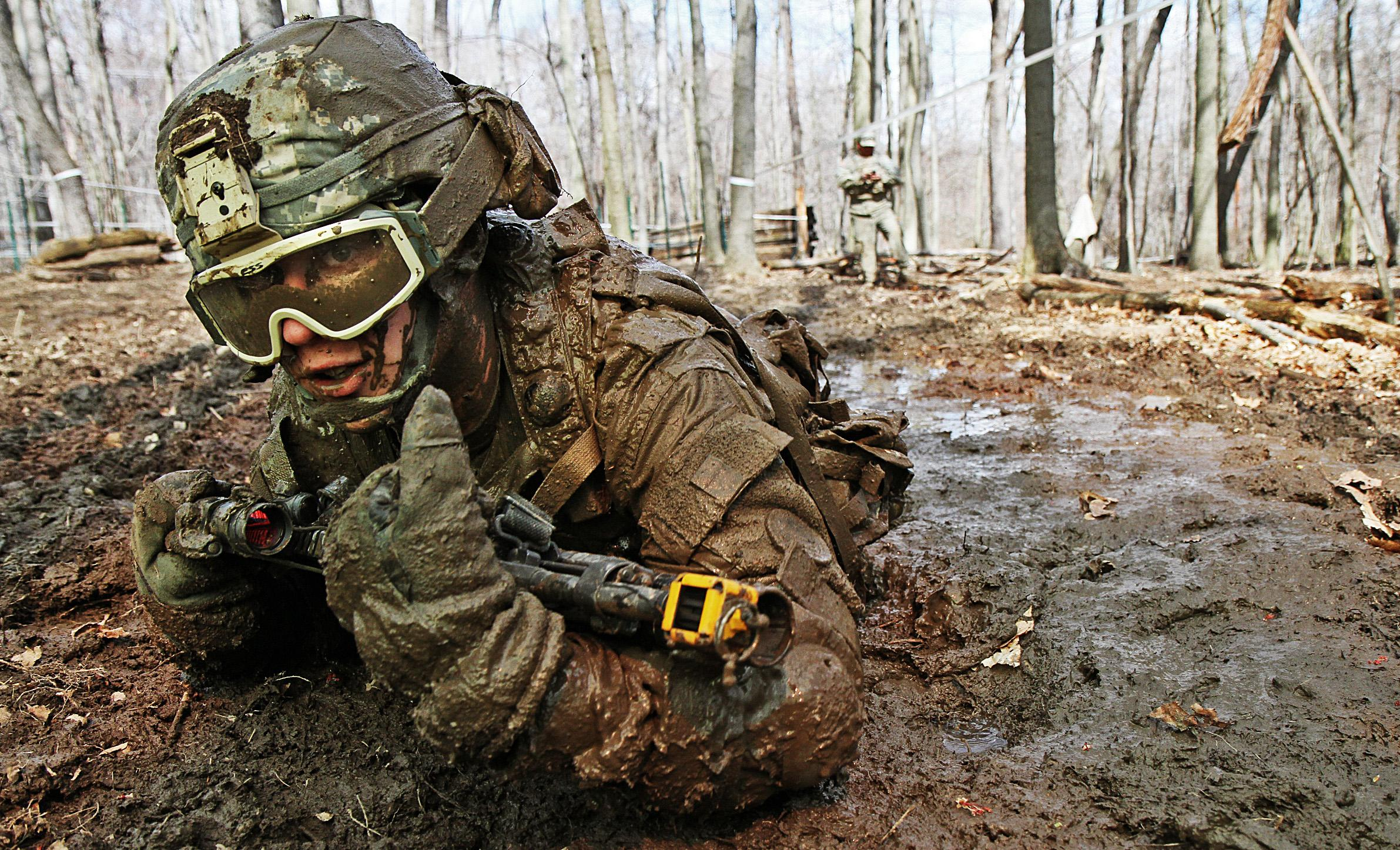
Soldier crawls through mud during training

The leopard crawl is a military-specific crawl. There are two versions, the leopard crawl proper and a modified version for when carrying weapons in the hands. This is a two-beat gait like a trot: an arm/elbow is advanced with the diagonal knee. This is designed for the smallest silhouette possible, and the body is often nearly or actually touching the ground, and although the elbow and knee are the main focus, most of the respective limbs touch the ground.

=== Tiger crawl ===
The tiger crawl is essentially a highly accelerated combination of crawl and leopard crawl. It uses the hands and the knees/feet depending upon the situation, while maintaining a silhouette almost as small as that of the leopard crawl. This is relatively fast gait but can take large amounts of energy.
