= Sidle =

Sidle may refer to:

== People ==
- Don Sidle (1946–1987), American professional basketball player
- Elisa Sidler (1932), Swiss sprint canoer
- Heinrich Schweizer-Sidler (1815-1894), Swiss philologist
- Jimmy Sidle (1942–1999), American football player
- Randy Sidler (1956), former American professional football player
- Winant Sidle (1916–2005), Major General in the United States Army

=== Fictional characters ===
- Sara Sidle, in the television series CSI: Crime Scene Investigation
- "Lou" the sidler, in the Seinfeld episode "The Merv Griffin Show"

== See also ==
- Side (disambiguation)
- Saddle (disambiguation)
- Sidel, a manufacturing company
- Sideways (disambiguation)
- Crabwalk (disambiguation)
