= CIDE =

-cide is a suffix that means killing.

Cide or CIDE may also refer to:

== Places ==
- Cide, a town in Turkey
- Cide Temple, a temple in Kaohsiung, Taiwan

== Arts, entertainment, and media ==
- Cide Hamete Benengeli, a fictional character in Don Quixote
- CIDE-FM, a Canadian radio station in Sioux Lookout, Ontario
- Collaborative International Dictionary of English, or CIDE

== Organizations ==
- Centro de Investigación y Docencia Económicas, or CIDE, a research and teaching facility in Mexico City
- Coordinación de Informaciones de Estado, or CIDE, a defunct Argentine intelligence agency

== See also ==
- List of types of killing
- Side (disambiguation)
