= Site =

Site or Sites may refer to:

- Location, a point or an area on the Earth's surface or elsewhere
  - Archaeological site
  - Campsite, a place used for overnight stay in an outdoor area
  - Construction site
  - Site, a National Register of Historic Places property type
- Website, a set of related web pages, typically with a common domain name
- Site (mathematics), a category C together with a Grothendieck topology on C

== Organizations ==
- SITE (originally known as Sculpture in the Environment), an American architecture and design firm
- SITE Intelligence Group, a for-profit organization tracking jihadist and white supremacist organizations
- SITE Institute, a terrorism-tracking organization, precursor to the SITE Intelligence Group
- Sindh Industrial and Trading Estate, a company in Sindh, Pakistan
- SITE Centers, American commercial real estate company

== Specific places ==
- SITE Town, a densely populated town in Karachi, Pakistan
- S.I.T.E Industrial Area, an area in Karachi, Pakistan
- Sites, California

== Arts and media ==
- The Site, a 1990s TV series that aired on MSNBC
- Site (film), directed by Jason Eric Perlman
- The Site (film), directed by Akihiro Hata

== Other names ==
- Satellite Instructional Television Experiment, an experimental satellite communications project launched in India in 1975
- Google Sites, web based website editor

== See also ==
- Side (disambiguation)
