= Sides (surname) =

Sides is a surname. Notable people with the surname include:

- Christie Sides (born 1977), American basketball head coach
- Doug Sides (born 1942), American jazz drummer
- Francis Sides (1913–1943), Australian cricketer
- Hampton Sides (born 1962), American historian, writer and journalist
- Jeremy Sides, American scuba diver and civilian crime investigator
- John H. Sides (1904–1978), United States Navy admiral
- John M. Sides, American political scientist
- Marilyn Sides, American writer
- Shawn Sides, American voice actress
