= Side (company) =

England-based gaming services company

- Formerly: Pole To Win
- Type: Subsidiary
- Industry: Video games
- Founded: 2009 (as Pole To Win America)
- Headquarters: London, UK
- Area served: Worldwide
- Key people: Deborah Kirkham (CEO); Teppei Tachibana (chairman)
- Number of employees: ~2,000
- Website: side.inc

Side is a global gaming services company based in London, formerly known as PTW (Pole To Win). Founded in 2009, the company initially provided quality assurance, localization, localization QA and player support to game developers and has since grown to provide audio production, co-development, art, and datasets following a series of acquisitions. The current CEO of Side is Deborah Kirkham, who has led the company since 2019.

Side has supported on the development of major AAA titles including Split Fiction (casting and voice recording), Clair Obscur: Expedition 33 (English casting and recording), and Madden NFL 26 (audio and co-development). In 2024, Side worked with partner studio in Kenya to deliver the first full Swahili voice cast in a game with Tales of Kenzara: Zau (casting, recording, direction, and post-production for the Kimvita Swahili version of the game).

Side employs around 2,000 employees across its global network of studios in Europe, Asia, South America and North America. Activision, Ubisoft, Electronic Arts, and Epic Games have all worked with Side.

== History ==
In 2009, Pole to Win America (now Side) opened its first US studio in Silicon Valley, having officially incorporated on August 5. Since then, PTW Holdings, which is listed on the Tokyo Stock Exchange, has been Side's parent company.

PTW, already recognised for its Localization, Localization QA and QA services, acquired the boutique audio firm, SIDE, in 2015. Based out of Oxford Street, London, SIDE was established in 1995 and offered specialist audio services to games, such as, casting and recording for both original and localized versions of games. Following the acquisition, PTW was able to expand the brand's presence globally, opening SIDE studios in Shanghai (February 2016), Los Angeles (March 2017), Paris (March 2023) and Tokyo (November 2023) under Pole to Win America.

In August 2012, PTW acquired e4e's interactive entertainment division. The division in question handled key gaming services, including QA testing and Localization as well as customer service functions, allowing PTW to expand into player support. The acquisition of e4e interactive instantly expanded PTW's footprint in the UK and India through e4e's physical sites in Glasgow and Bangalore respectively. In that same year, PTW set up in the UK as Pole to Win Europe, which went on to become Pole to Win International and finally Side International UK in 2025 following a rebrand.

In 2019, a major leadership change saw the company promote Deborah Kirkham to CEO, taking over from Teppei Tachibana. Under Kirkham, the company continued its expansion program, opening studios in Montreal (July 2019), Bangalore (February 2020), Braga (May 2023), São Paulo (November 2023), Tokyo (2023) and Charleston (December 2024). It also completed the acquisitions of 5518 Studios (renamed 1518 Studios) in February 2021, Vibe Avenue in October 2023 and Ghostpunch Games in August 2024. Also in 2024, PTW expanded its partnership with Andy Serkis-owned Imaginarium Studios with the opening of a new motion capture facility at SIDE London. These acquisitions and partnerships grew the business into the art, game development and music and sound design areas of the gaming services industry, making PTW a provider of the full-suite of gaming services.

In March 2025, PTW formally rebranded the company to Side; each of the respective specialist brands (SIDE, Ghostpunch, Vibe Avenue, 1518 Studios and PTW) were retired and moved under Side, positioning the company as a full gaming service provider.

Following the rebrand, Side turned its focus to technological development with AI. It signed a partnership deal with Razer to create an AI-powered QA and playtesting solution for developers. The concept was first announced in March 2025 at the Game Developers Conference and Razer Cortex Playtest: Powered by Side officially launched at Gamescom in August 2025, allowing gamers using the Razer Cortex launcher to register as playtesters.

=== Global expansion (as Side) ===
Having started with one studio in Silicon Valley, Side has expanded globally since 2009 and now runs over 15 studios across North America, South America, Europe and Asia. In 2025, Side focused its expansion efforts in emerging markets, doubling its teams in Braga and São Paulo. The company also expressed a public interest in growing into the Middle East, signing a memorandum of understanding with Savvy Games Group. The document included a commitment to opening a studio in Riyadh in the near future.

In 2026, Side opened a new studio in Taipei, announcing the creation of 75 new gaming jobs in the city as well as the implementation of new AI solutions. The studio was opened through a ceremony, attended by executives from the company and parent company, including CEO of PTW Holdings, Teppei Tachibana.

=== Memorandum of understanding with Modl.ai ===
At the 2026 edition of Gamescom Side announced an official partnership with the Danish AI software company, Modl.ai to media. Side, which provides QA services to AAA games developers and consumer technology producers globally stated that Modl.ai's technology would make it possible for QA testers to automate a significant portion of regression testing (repeat tests that must be completed upon each new build of a game). The company's chief revenue officer, Martin McBride, was quoted by press who attended the briefing saying that Side would provide AI on a sliding scale. The partnership was described as a six month explorative period, to develop the existing AI tool created by Modl.ai through pilot programmes with Side's partner network.

== Awards ==
Award Provider	Year	Award	Result	Category	Brand	Ref
Develop: Star	2006	Creative Services	Winner	Audio	SIDE	
Develop	2009	Creative Services	Winner	Audio	SIDE	
Develop	2010	Best Audio Outsourcer	Winner	Audio	SIDE	
Develop	2011	Best Audio Outsourcer	Winner	Audio	SIDE	
Develop	2012	Best Audio Outsourcer	Winner	Audio	SIDE	
Develop: Star	2013	Creative Outsourcer – Audio	Winner	Audio	SIDE	
TIGA	2014	Audio Supplier	Winner	Audio	SIDE	
Develop	2015	Creative Outsourcer – Audio	Winner	Audio	SIDE	
TIGA	2015	Audio Supplier	Winner	Audio	SIDE	
Develop	2016	Creative Outsourcer – Audio	Winner	Audio	SIDE	
Develop: Star	2020	Best Creative Provider	Winner	Audio	SIDE	
TIGA	2021	Best QA & Localization Provider	Winner	QA	PTW	
TIGA	2021	Best Audio Services Supplier	Winner	Audio	SIDE	
TIGA	2022	Services Provider	Winner	All	PTW	
TIGA	2024	Audio Services Supplier	Winner	Audio	SIDE	
TIGA	2025	Outstanding Leadership	Winner	Leadership	Deborah Kirkham	
TIGA	2025	Co-dev Partner	Winner	Codev	Side	
MCV Develop	2026	Best Codeveloper	Finalist	Codev	Side	
MCV Develop	2026	Best Strategic Partner	Winner	QA	Side	
Develop	2026	Best Technical Innovation	Finalist	Audio	Side	
Develop	2026	Best Supporting Star	Finalist	All	Side	
TIGA	2026	Codeveloper of the Year	Finalist	Codev	Side	
TIGA	2026	QA and Localisation Partner of the Year	Finalist	QA/Localisation	Side	
TIGA	2026	Service Partner of the Year	Finalist	All	Side	
TIGA	2026	Technical Innocation of the Year	Finalist	Audio	Side	

== See also ==
- Video games in the United Kingdom
- Keywords Studios
- Virtuos
