= Bridge (grappling) =

Grappling move

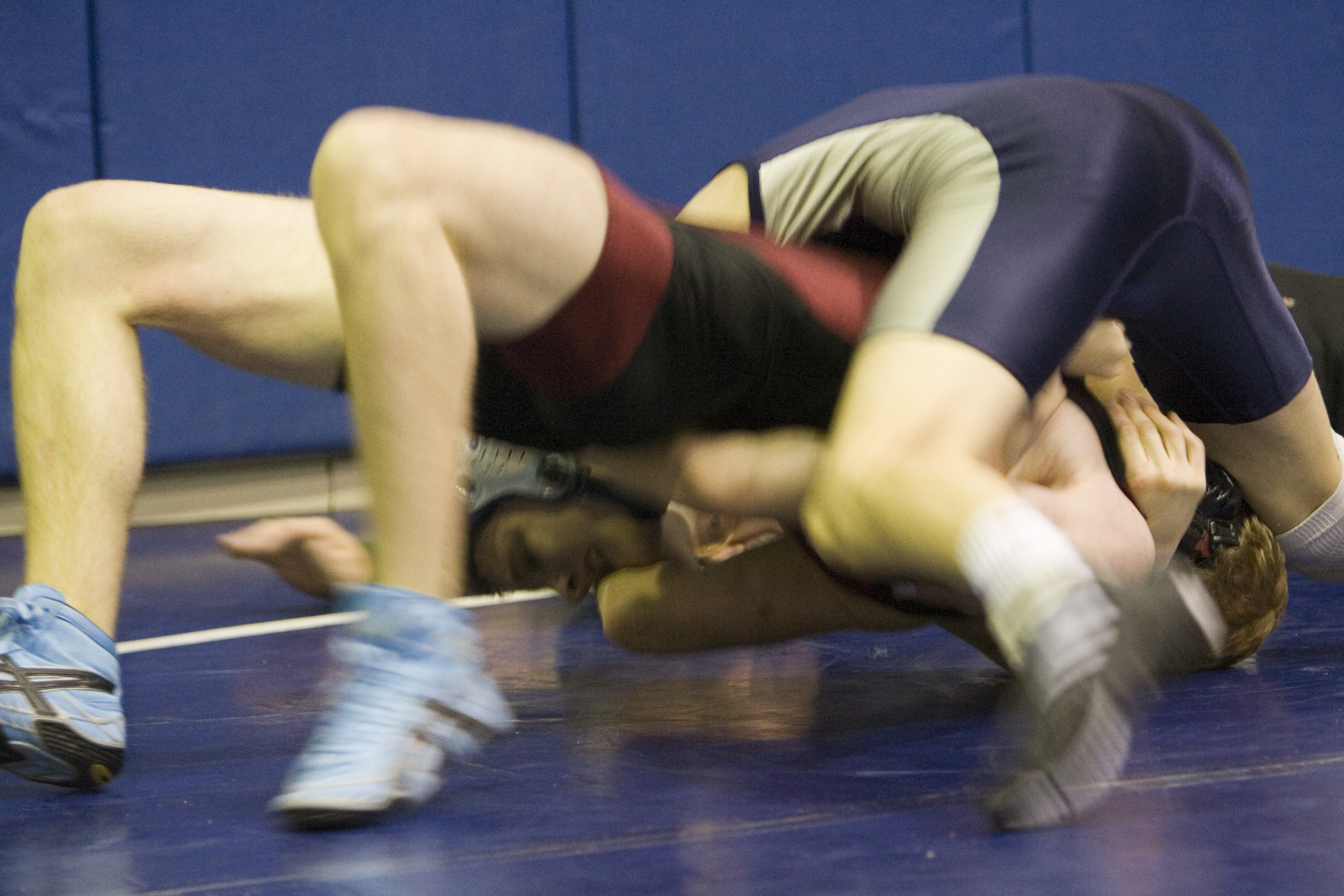
- Wrestler on the bottom attempts to bridge out of a pin move
- Classification: Escape
- Style: Wrestling, Judo, Brazilian jiu-jitsu

The bridge is a grappling move performed from a supine position (lying down, face-up). It involves lifting the pelvis off the ground so that the body weight is supported on the shoulders (or head) at one end and on the feet at the other. This move is used in wrestling and other grappling and groundfighting sports, often combined with a twisting motion, to dislodge or flip an opponent who has established a position on top. The bridge is also a common exercise position. This maneuver can also be used to avoid pin attempts in wrestling.

In Brazilian jiu-jitsu, this move is referred to as an upa, and is commonly used in attempting to dislodge an opponent in mounted position.

== See also ==
- Crab (posture)
- Bridge (exercise)
