= Side (Ainis) =

Coordinates: 38°56′25″N 22°22′18″E

Side (Ancient Greek: Σίδη) was a place on the border between the two cities of Lamia and Hypata, in Ainis in ancient Thessaly. It is mentioned only in a boundary adjudication inscription of the Hadrianic period, CIL 3.586.

Its site is identified with an ancient fortress on a hill near Lygaria (Lygaria was, until 1920, called Tsopalades) in Phthiotida regional unit.
