= Crab (posture) =

Body position

The crab is a body position sometimes seen in basic gymnastics, yoga, and breakdancing. The body is supinated so that the back turns to the ground, and only the feet and hands make contact with the ground.

== Etymology ==
The position's name originates from that of a crab.

== Variations ==
Shoulders extended: the arms are held just behind the body with the shoulder joint in hyperextension.

Shoulders flexed: the arms are held alongside the head. This is also known as the gymnastic bridge.

== See also ==
- Bridge (exercise)
- Bridge (grappling)
