= Bridge (exercise) =

Exercise and body posture

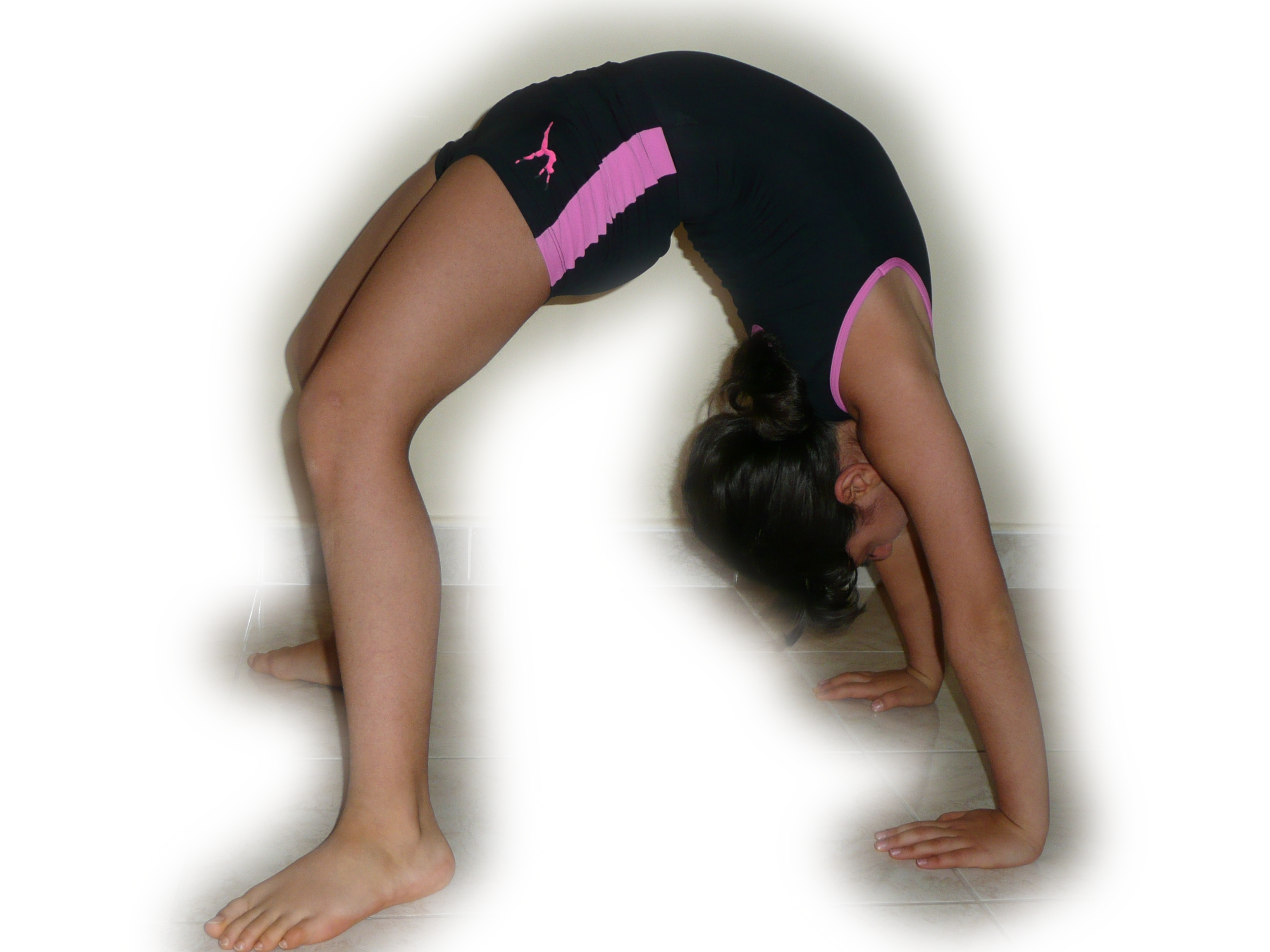

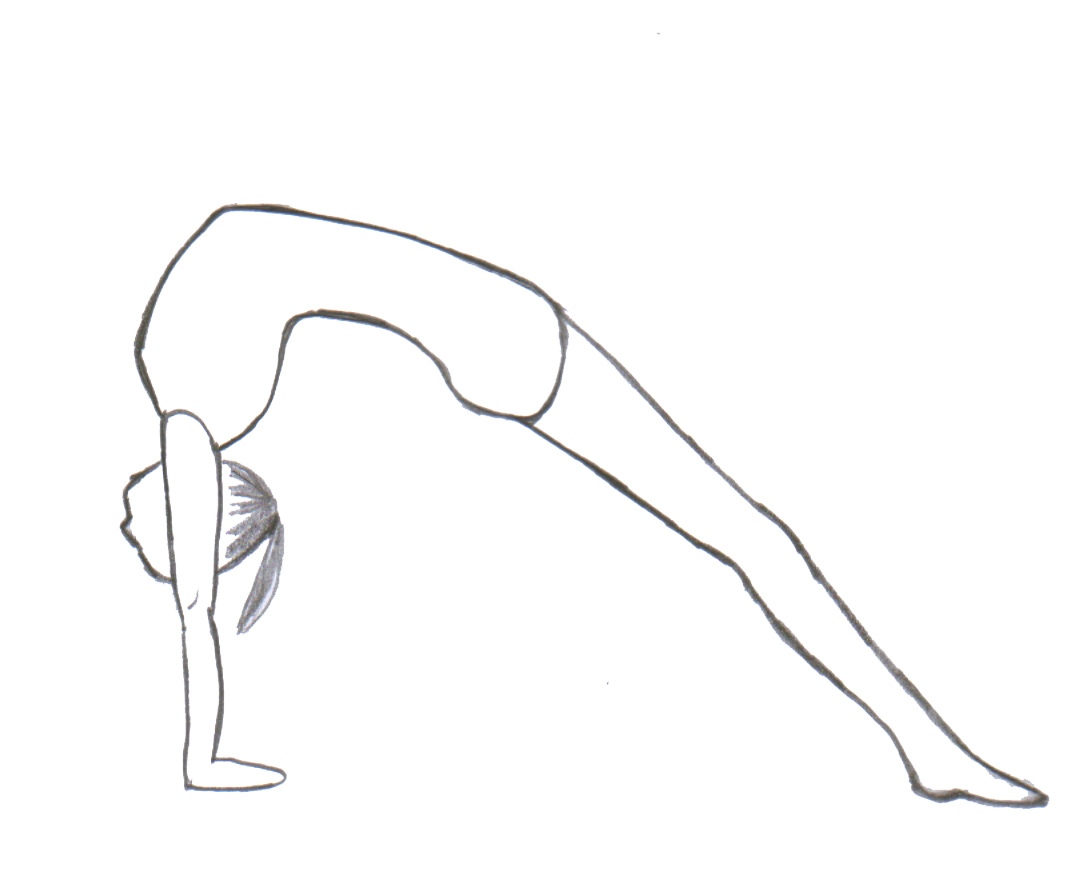
An image of a bridge position with straight legs. The body is pushed over the shoulders to enable straight vertical arms, stretching the shoulders and upper body

The bridge (also called gymnastic bridge) is an exercise. Many variations of this exercise are employed throughout the world, most commonly the balancing of the body on the hands and the feet. It is intended to improve lower back and gluteus strength. Examples of bridging in sportive or self-defense applications are seen in Kung Fu, Judo, Brazilian jiu jitsu, Capoeira, mixed martial arts, and wrestling.

In yoga, this particular pose is called Chakrasana, Urdhva Dhanurasana, or Wheel, while the Westernized nickname "Bridge pose" refers to a less rigorous supine backbend called Setu Bandha Sarvangasana, in which the body is fairly straight from knees to shoulders, and most of the bend is in the knees.

== Variations ==
The bridging exercise is not a singular movement, but includes a wide range of variations and progressions. There is no single agreed upon "standard" variation of the bridge like with other common bodyweight exercises.

=== Bridge hold ===
The bridge hold is a static variation of the bridge exercise that involves getting into the full bridge as shown at the top of the article and holding the position, either for time or until exhaustion. This variation is possibly the most frequent variation of the bridge around the world, but is most commonly used in Calisthenics circles to build strength in order to progress to some of the more difficult bridge variations.

=== Bridge push-up ===
The bridge push-up involves lying on the ground on the back with the feet pulled up to the buttocks and palms of the hands against the ground on either side of the head, followed by "pushing" the entire body upwards with both arms and feet. The practitioner then pulls the body back to the original position and repeats the whole movement for a set amount of repetitions, or until exhaustion. This is also one of the ways to get into the bridge hold position, along with the closing bridge below.

=== One-armed bridge push-up ===
A great amount of further difficulty can be introduced to the regular bridge push-up by executing the movement only supported by one arm. This also introduces unilaterality to the movement, primarily working only one side of the spinal erectors, and especially only one of the deltoids.

=== One-legged bridge push-up ===
Just like above, the bridge push-up can also be executed with one leg extended. When this is done, not only is unilaterality introduced, but the hamstrings and glutes (as well as other muscles of the lower extremities worked by the bridge) are worked far more.

=== Wall walking ===
Wall walking is another popular bridge variation that involves standing with one's back to a wall at a varying distance, followed by leaning backwards until one can press one's palms into the wall from behind. The practitioner then proceeds to "walk" with their hands along the wall down to the floor. To make the exercise more difficult, one can also finish the movement by proceeding to "walk" all the way back up again, then pushing off the wall with the arms back into the original standing position. This can be done for several repetitions.

=== Closing bridge ===
The closing bridge involves standing straight up with varying foot distance, then slowly leaning further and further backwards with the arms reaching back, until one comes all the way down into a standing bridge. This is the typical way that gymnasts go into the bridge hold position above, but is also an excellent strength exercise in itself when done for multiple repetitions.

=== Stand-to-stand bridge ===
This variation is considered by some to be the most advanced variation of the bridge, and is by far the one that requires the most strength. It involves performing a full closing bridge as above, followed by "opening" the bridge again by either pushing off the floor with the arms or coming back into standing position relying solely on the muscles in the torso and legs. Furthermore, unilaterality can be introduced to this variation by performing the whole movement with only one arm.

== See also ==
- Crab (posture)
- Bridge (grappling)
