= Boxing =

Combat sport and martial art

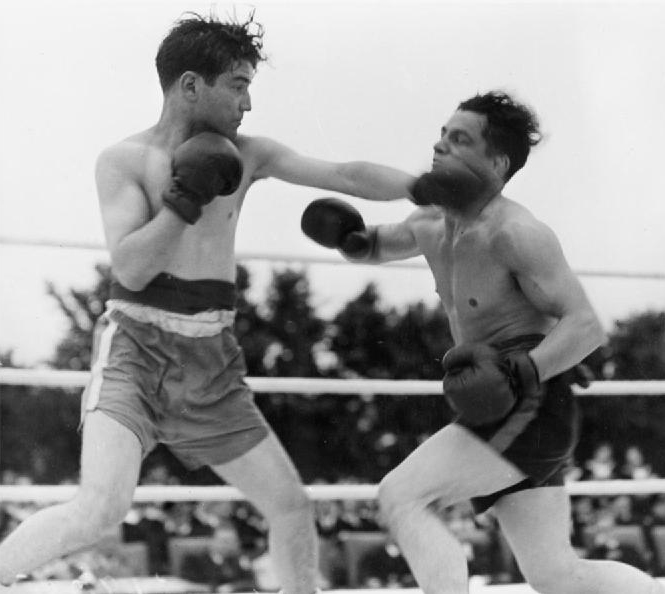
- Two Royal Navy men boxing for charity in July 1945
- Also known as: Western boxing, pugilism (Note: The Encyclopædia Britannica Eleventh Edition notes as different pugilism and boxing. Vol. 4 "Boxing" (p. 350) "Boxing" . Encyclopædia Britannica. Vol. 4 (11th ed.). 1911. pp. 350–352. & Vol. 22 "Pugilism" (p. 637) "Pugilism" . Encyclopædia Britannica. Vol. 22 (11th ed.). 1911. pp. 637–639.)
- Focus: Punching, striking
- Country of origin: The sport itself: Ancient history, possibly Prehistoric; Modern rules: United Kingdom
- Olympic sport: 688 BC (ancient Greece); 1904 (modern)

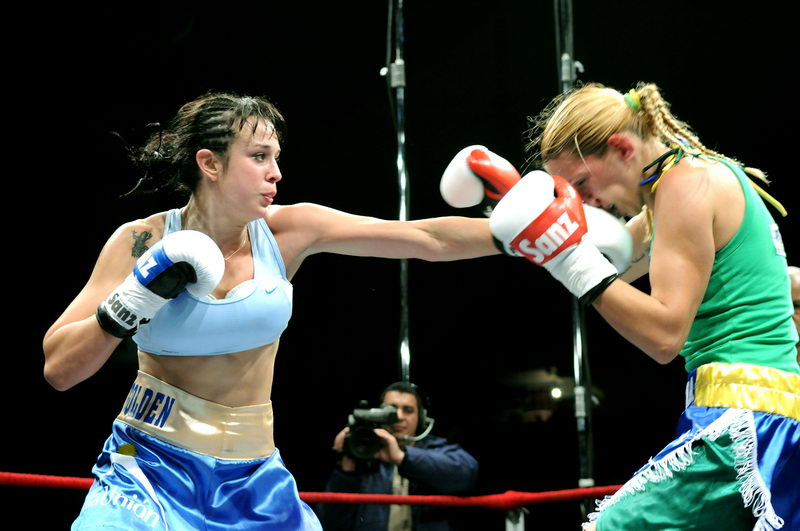
A woman's boxing match in Uruguay in 2008

Boxing (Note: Also known as western boxing or pugilism.) is a combat sport and martial art. Taking place in a boxing ring, it involves two opponents throwing punches at each other for a predetermined amount of time. It is usually done wearing protective equipment, such as protective gloves, hand wraps, and mouthguards.

Although the term 'boxing' commonly refers to the Western style, where only the fists are used, it has evolved differently in various regions and cultures across the world. Today the term, "boxing" is also used to refer to any combat sport focused on striking, where two opponents fight each other using their fists, and could possibly involve kicks, elbow strikes, knee strikes, and headbutts, depending on the rules. These include bare-knuckle boxing, kickboxing, Muay Thai, Lethwei, savate, and sanda. Boxing techniques have been incorporated into many martial arts, military systems, as well as other combat sports.

Humans have engaged in hand-to-hand combat since the beginning of human history. It is unclear when boxing became a sport, but some sources suggest prehistoric origins, dating back to as early as the 6th millennium BC in what is now Ethiopia. It is believed that when the Egyptians invaded Nubia, they adopted boxing from the local populace, subsequently popularizing it in Egypt. From there, the sport of boxing spread to various regions, including Greece, eastward to Mesopotamia, and northward to Rome.

The earliest visual evidence of boxing comes from Egypt and Sumer, both from the 3rd millennium, and are found in Sumerian carvings dating to the 3rd and 2nd millennium BC. The earliest evidence of boxing rules dates back to Ancient Greece, when boxing was added to the Olympic games in 688 BC. Boxing evolved through the prizefights of the 16th - 18th-centuries, largely in Great Britain, to its modern forerunner in the mid-19th century, with the introduction of the Marquess of Queensberry Rules in 1867.

Boxing is overseen by a referee and consists of a series of 1 - 3 minute intervals called "rounds". A winner can be decided before the rounds are complete if a referee determines that an opponent is unable to continue, disqualifies an opponent, or if the opponent is knocked out or quits. When the fight reaches the end of its final round, and both opponents are still standing, the winner is determined by the judges' scorecards. In case both fighters gain equal scores from the judges, it is considered a draw. In Olympic boxing, because a winner must be declared, judges award the contest to one fighter based on technical criteria. Amateur boxing is part of both the Olympics and Commonwealth Games, and is a standard feature in most international games. Boxing also has its own world championships, which are governed by the WBA, WBC, IBF, and WBO.

== History ==
=== Ancient history ===
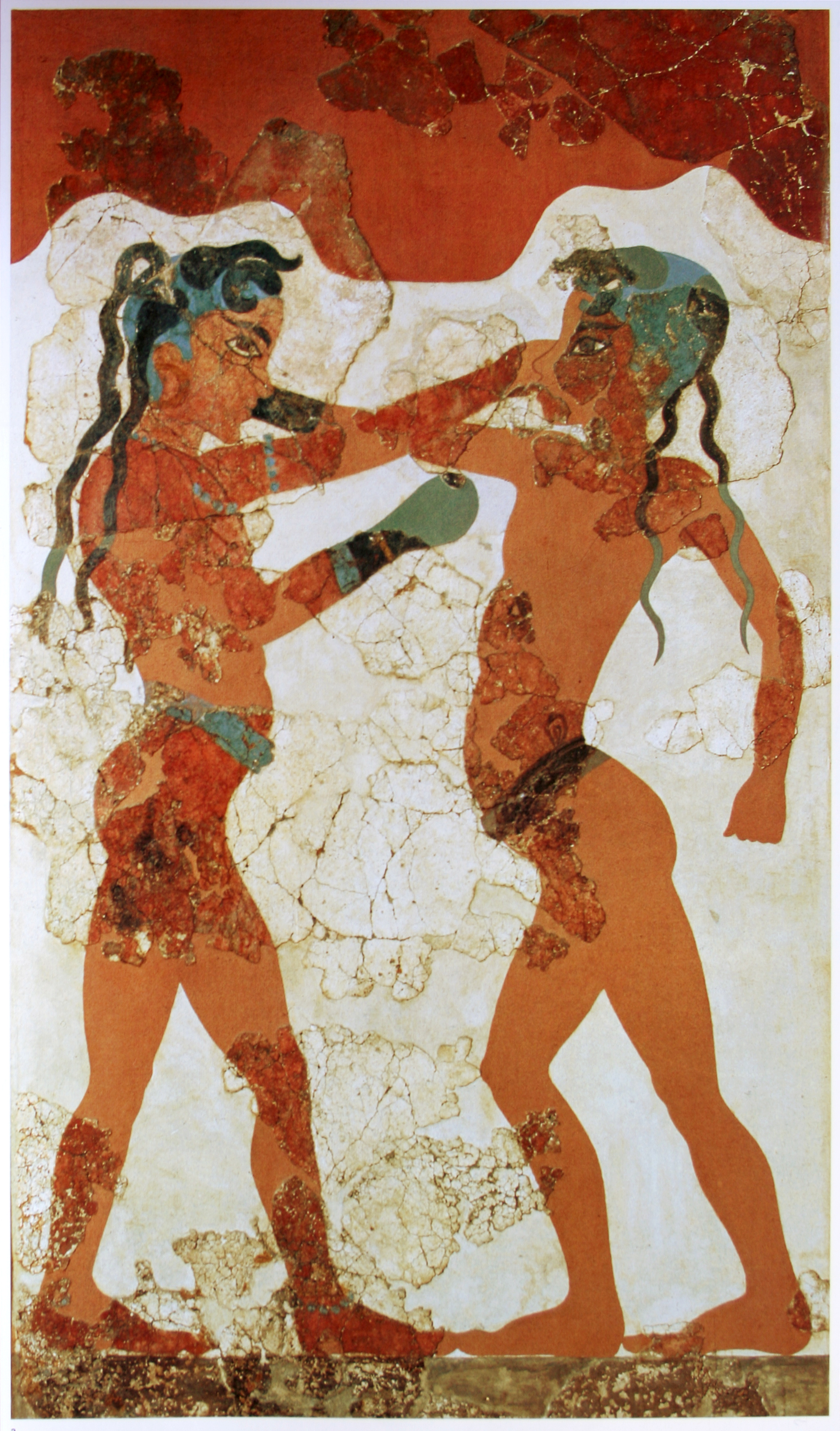
An Akrotiri fresco painting of Minoan youths boxing, the earliest documented use of boxing gloves, c. 1650 BC

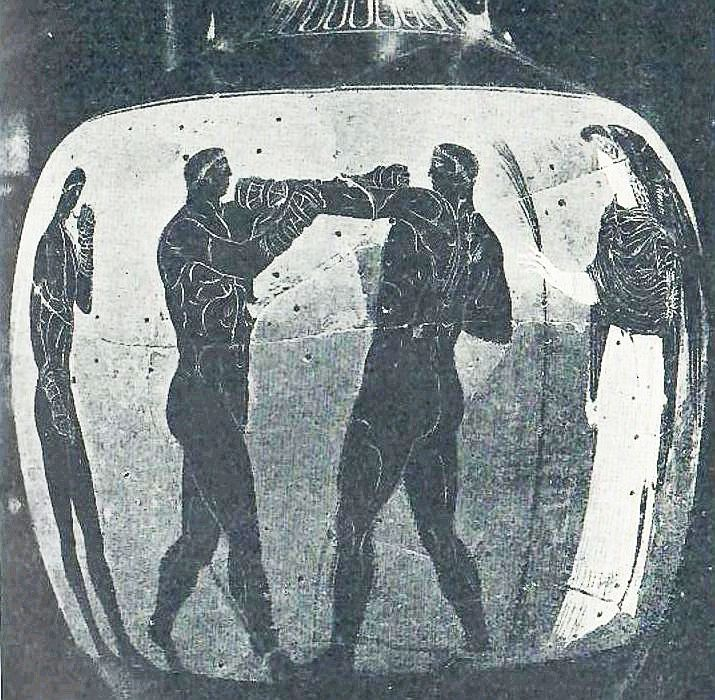
A boxing scene depicted on a Panathenaic amphora in Ancient Greece, c. 336 BC, now housed at the British Museum

Hitting with extremities of the body, such as kicks and punches, as an act of human aggression, has existed across the world's cultures throughout human history, being a combat system as old as wrestling. However, in terms of sports competition, due to the lack of writing in the prehistory and the lack of references, it is not possible to determine rules of any kind of boxing in prehistory; ancient history can be inferred from only the few intact sources and references to boxing-like activities.

The origin of the sport of boxing is unknown. However, Bert Blewett, in his 1999 A-Z of World Boxing, states it may have prehistoric origins in present-day Ethiopia, where it appeared in the sixth millennium BC. When the Middle Kingdom of Egypt invaded Nubia, it learned the art of boxing from the local population and brought the sport back to Egypt, where it became popular. From Egypt, boxing spread to other lands, including Greece, eastward to Mesopotamia, and northward to Rome.

The earliest visual evidence of any boxing is in Mesopotamian stone reliefs of the end of the fourth millennium BC. There are similar reliefs from Egypt and Sumer, both from the third millennium BC. A relief sculpture from Egyptian Thebes c. 1350 BC shows both boxers and spectators. These early Middle Eastern and Egyptian reliefs depicted contests wherein fighters were either bare-fisted or had a band supporting the wrist. The earliest evidence of the use of gloves can be found in Minoan Crete (c. 1500–1400 BC).

A number of boxing forms existed in ancient India. The earliest references to musti-yuddha come from Indian epic poetry, such as the Rig Veda (c. 1500–1000 BCE) and Ramayana (c. 700–400 BCE). The Mahabharata describes two combatants boxing with clenched fists and fighting with kicks, finger strikes, knee strikes and headbutts during the time of King Virata. Duels (niyuddham) were often fought to the death. During the period of the Western Satraps, the ruler Rudradaman—in addition to being well-versed in Indian classical music, Sanskrit grammar, and logic—was said to be an excellent horseman, charioteer, elephant rider, swordsman, and boxer. The Gurbilas Shemi, an 18th-century Sikh text, gives numerous references to musti-yuddha. The martial art is related to other forms of martial arts found in other parts of Greater India, including Muay Thai in Thailand, Muay Lao in Laos, Pradal Serey in Cambodia, and Lethwei in Myanmar.

The first record of a "prize fight" in literature is the funeral games for Patroclus in the Iliad (c.750 BC). Ancient Greek boxing (Ancient Greek: πυγμαχία, romanized: pygmakhia, lit. 'fist-fighting'; also transliterated as pygmachía) was a well-developed sport and enjoyed consistent popularity. Boxing was introduced in the Ancient Olympic Games of 688 BC. The boxers would wind leather thongs around their hands in order to protect them. There were no rounds, and boxers fought until one acknowledged defeat or could not continue. Weight categories were not used, which led to heavier fighters often dominating. The style of boxing typically featured an advanced left-leg stance, with the left arm semi-extended as a guard, used for striking, and the right arm drawn back, ready to strike. The head of the opponent was primarily targeted, and there is little evidence that targeting the body or using kicks was common, thus resembling modern Western boxing.

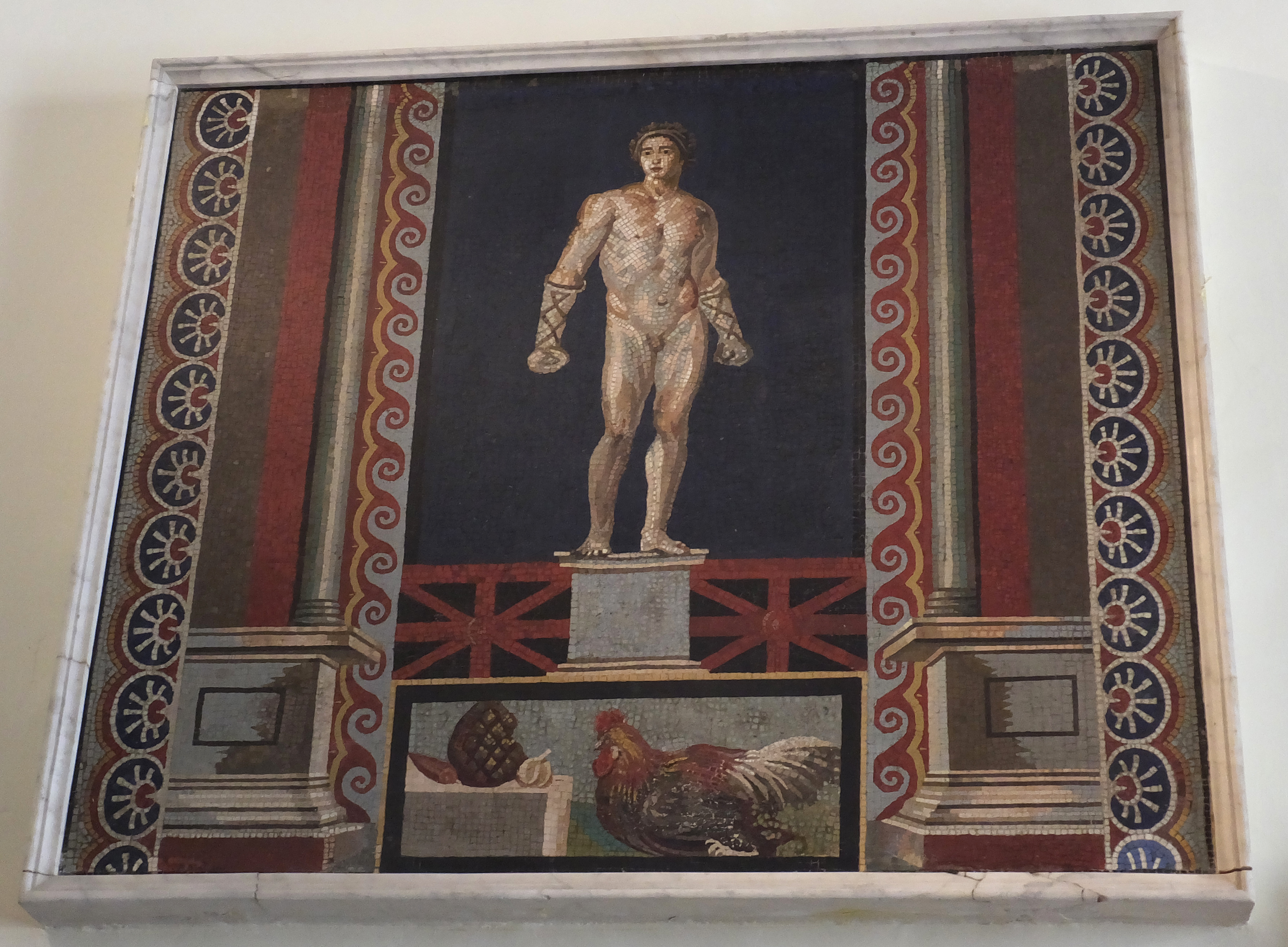
A boxer and a rooster in a Roman mosaic of first century AD at the National Archaeological Museum, Naples

Boxing was a popular spectator sport in Ancient Rome. Fighters protected their knuckles with leather strips wrapped around their fists. Eventually, harder leather was used, and the strips became a weapon. Metal studs were introduced to the strips to make the cestus. Fighting events were held in Roman amphitheatres.

Records of boxing activity disappeared in the West after the fall of the Western Roman Empire, when the wearing of weapons became common once again and interest in fistfighting waned. However, there are detailed records of various fist-fighting sports that were maintained in different cities and provinces of Italy between the 12th and 17th centuries. In ancient Rus, bare-knuckle boxing was known as kulachniy boy (Russian: кулачный бой, lit. 'fist fight'), first appearing in the Church Slavonic Primary Chronicle published c. 1117.

=== Early London prize ring rules ===
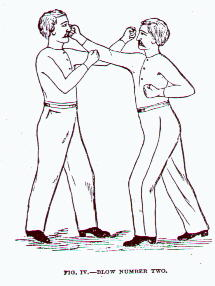
A straight right demonstrated in Edmund Price's The Science of Defence: A Treatise on Sparring and Wrestling, published in 1867

As the wearing of swords became less common, there was renewed interest in fencing with the fists. The sport later resurfaced in England during the early 16th century as bare-knuckle boxing, also known as prizefighting. The first documented account of a bare-knuckle fight in England appeared in 1681 in the London Protestant Mercury, and the first English bare-knuckle champion was James Figg in 1719. It was at this point that the term "boxing" first came to be used, though the earliest form of modern boxing was very different from boxing as practiced now. Contests in Figg's time, in addition to fistfighting, also included fencing and cudgeling. On 6 January 1681, the first recorded boxing match took place in Britain with Christopher Monck, 2nd Duke of Albemarle (later the lieutenant governor of Jamaica) engineering a match between his butler and his butcher; the latter won the prize.

Early fighting had no written rules, weight divisions, round limits, or referees. As a result, it was an extremely chaotic and brutal affair. An early article on boxing was published in Nottingham in 1713 by Sir Thomas Parkyns, 2nd Baronet, a wrestling patron from Bunny, Nottinghamshire, who had practised the techniques he described. The article, a single page in his manual of wrestling and fencing, Progymnasmata: The inn-play, or Cornish-hugg wrestler, described a system of headbutting, punching, eye-gouging, chokes, and hard throws, not recognized in boxing today. A newspaper of 1723 reported that women also took part in boxing.

The first boxing rules, called the Broughton Rules, were introduced by champion Jack Broughton in 1743 to protect fighters in the ring, where deaths sometimes occurred. Under these rules, if a man went down and could not continue after a count of 30 seconds, the fight was over. Hitting a downed fighter and grasping below the waist were prohibited. Broughton encouraged the use of "mufflers", a form of padded bandage or mitten, to be used in "jousting" or sparring sessions in training, and in exhibition matches.

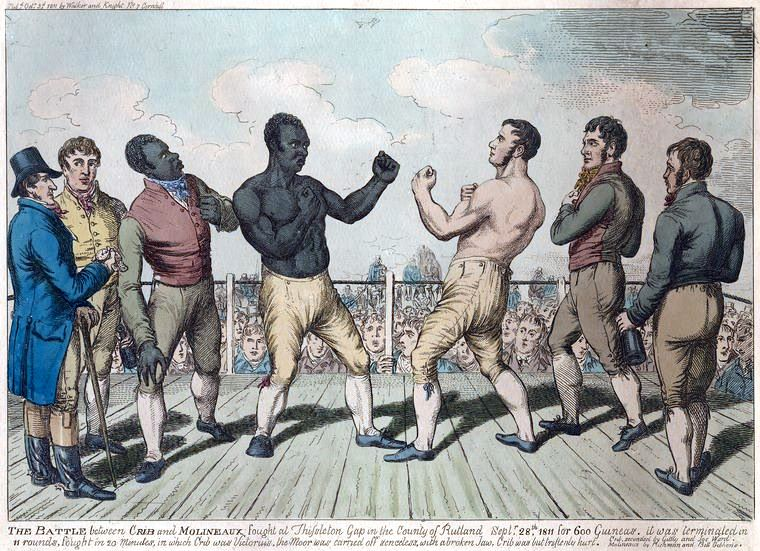
Tom Molineaux (left) vs. Tom Cribb in a rematch for the heavyweight championship of England in 1811

These rules gave fighters an advantage not enjoyed by today's boxers; they allowed a fighter to drop to one knee to end the round and begin the 30-second count at any time. Thus, a fighter realizing he was in trouble had an opportunity to recover. However, this was considered "unmanly", and it was frequently disallowed by additional rules negotiated by the seconds of the boxers. In modern boxing, there is a three-minute limit to rounds (unlike the downed fighter ends the round rule). Intentionally going down in modern boxing will result in the recovering fighter losing points under the scoring system. Furthermore, as the contestants did not have heavy leather gloves and wristwraps to protect their hands, they used different punching techniques to avoid injury, since the head was a common target to hit full force. Almost all period manuals have powerful straight punches with the whole body behind them to the face (including forehead) as the basic blows.

The British sportswriter Pierce Egan coined the term "the sweet science" as an epithet for prizefighting—or more fully "the sweet science of bruising"—as a description of England's bare-knuckle fight scene in the early nineteenth century.

Boxing could also be used to settle disputes, even by females. In 1790, in Waddington, Lincolnshire, Mary Farmery and Susanna Locker both laid claim to the affections of a young man; this led Farmery to challenge Locker to a fight for the prize, which was accepted. Proper sidespersons were chosen, and every matter was conducted in form. After several knock-down blows on both sides, the battle ended in favour of Farmery.

The London Prize Ring Rules introduced measures that remain in effect for professional boxing to this day, such as outlawing butting, gouging, scratching, kicking, hitting a man while down, holding the ropes, and using resin, stones, or hard objects in the hands, and biting.

Boxing in the United States was imported from England. Slave-owners trained enslaved people to fight others and gambled on the outcome, and sometimes gave freedom to those who won money. The first professional boxers in the US were free Black men.

=== Marquess of Queensberry rules (1867) ===
The June 1894 Leonard–Cushing bout. Each of the six one-minute rounds recorded by the Kinetograph was made available to exhibitors for $22.50. Customers who watched the final round saw Leonard score a knockdown.

In 1867, the Marquess of Queensberry rules were drafted by John Graham Chambers for amateur championships held at Lillie Bridge in London for lightweights, middleweights, and heavyweights. The rules were published under the patronage of John Sholto Douglas, 9th Marquess of Queensberry, whose name has always been associated with them.

There were twelve rules in all, specifying that fights should be "a fair stand-up boxing match" in a 24-foot-square or similar ring. Rounds were 3 minutes, with 1-minute rest intervals between rounds. Each fighter was given a 10-second count if knocked down, and wrestling was banned. The introduction of boxing gloves of "fair-size" also changed the nature of the bouts. An average pair of boxing gloves resembles a bloated pair of mittens and is laced up around the wrists.

The gloves can be used to block an opponent's blows. As a result of their introduction, bouts became longer and more strategic, with greater importance placed on defensive maneuvers such as slipping, bobbing, countering, and angling. Because less emphasis was placed on the forearms and more on the gloves, the classical forearms-outwards, torso-lean-back stance of the bare-knuckle boxer was modified into a more modern stance in which the torso is tilted forward, and the hands are held closer to the face.

=== Late 19th century ===
Throughout the late 19th century, boxing, or prizefighting, was primarily a sport of dubious legitimacy. Outlawed in England and much of the United States, prizefights were often held at gambling venues and broken up by police. Brawling and wrestling tactics continued, and riots at prizefights were common occurrences. Still, throughout this period, some notable bare-knuckle champions developed fairly sophisticated fighting tactics. The English case of R v. Coney in 1882 found that a bare-knuckle fight was an assault occasioning actual bodily harm, despite the consent of the participants. This marked the end of widespread public bare-knuckle contests in England.

In the 1890s, the United States began to eclipse Britain as the center of boxing. The first world heavyweight champion under the Queensberry Rules was James J. Corbett, who defeated John L. Sullivan in 1892 at the Pelican Athletic Club in New Orleans, Louisiana. The last British heavyweight champion was Robert Fitzsimmons, who lost his title in 1899.

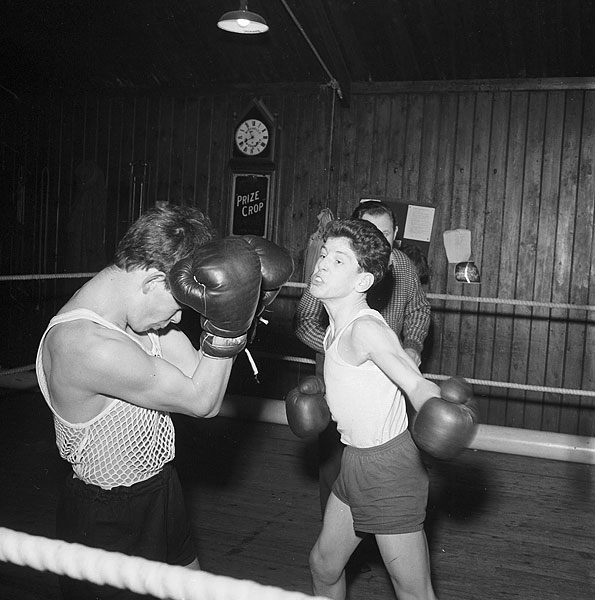
Amateur Boxing Club, Wales, 1963

The first instance of film censorship in the United States occurred in 1897 when several states banned the showing of prize-fighting films from the state of Nevada, where it was legal at the time. John L. Sullivan was the great champion of the end of the 19th century.

=== Early to mid-20th century ===
Throughout the early 20th century, boxers struggled to achieve legitimacy. Irish Americans became the prototypical examples of boxers, and other immigrants to the United States emulated their example. Boxing promoters often pitted fighters of different ethnicities against one another, as a means of capitalizing on cultural competition. The modern Olympic Games movement revived interest in amateur sports, and amateur boxing became an Olympic sport in 1908.

From 1908 to 1915, Jack Johnson was the heavyweight champion. As a Black man, Johnson represented a serious challenge to the white-dominated culture of the United States. Boxing was then racially segregated in the U.S. Jimmy Wilde became the champion. Jack Dempsey became the heavyweight champion in 1919. Radio broadcasts of fights began in 1920 and became popular globally. In the 1920s, newspaper sports pages also became popular and published gossip about athletes such as Dempsey, as well as reports of sporting events. There were also several films about boxing in the decade, such as The Champeen (1923). Dempsey lost his title to Gene Tunney in 1927. The title was desegregated, and Joe Louis became the champion between 1937 and 1949. Sugar Ray Robinson became the welterweight champion between 1945 and 1951, and then middleweight champion between 1951 and 1960. While often considered one of the best "pound for pound" fighters, he did not have the same cultural impact because the lower weight classes were not given the same mainstream attention. Muhammad Ali became the dominant boxer of the 1960s and 1970s.

=== Contemporary boxing ===
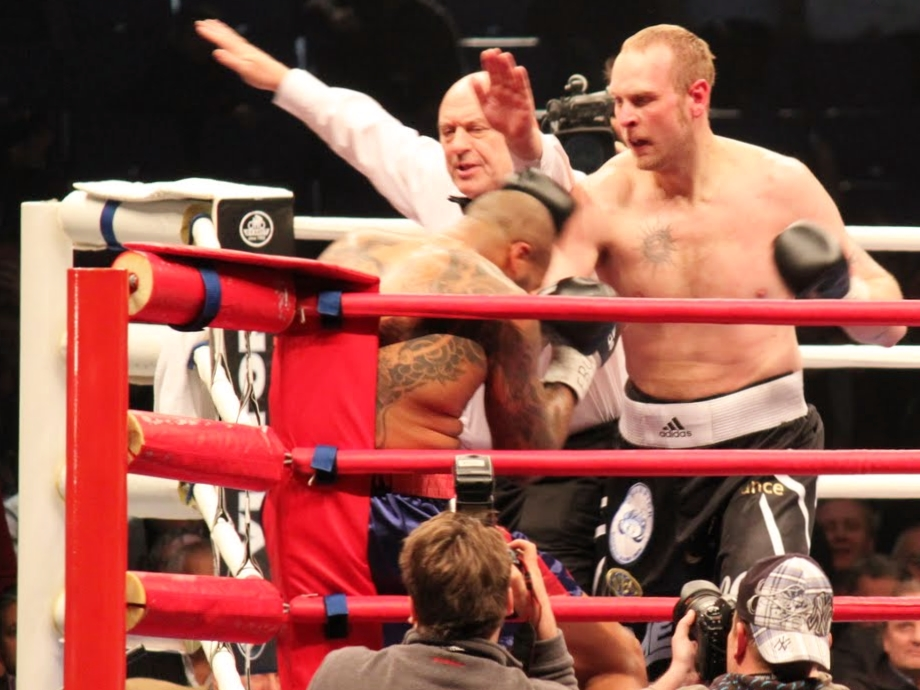
Robert Helenius (right) vs. Attila Levin (left) at Hartwall Arena in Helsinki, Finland, on 27 November 2010

Mike Tyson was the star boxer of the 1980s. Boxing has become a multibillion-dollar commercial enterprise. A majority of young talent still comes from poverty-stricken areas around the world. Places like Mexico, Africa, South America, and Eastern Europe prove to be filled with young aspiring athletes who wish to become the future of boxing. Even in the U.S., places like the inner cities of New York and Chicago have produced promising young talent. According to Rubin, "boxing lost its appeal with the American middle class, and most of who boxes in modern America come from the streets and are street fighters".

==== Influencer and cross-over boxing ====
The landscape of boxing in the 2020s has changed drastically compared to what it was decades ago. With the rise of influencer and cross-over boxing, boxing has now been introduced to a much wider audience. Professional boxing has always been about the best boxers in the world show-casing their decades of experience. Now some of the most popular fights are fights showcasing influencers from different types of social media platforms.. Mike Tyson versus Jake Paul was a massive hit, with a live gate of $17.8 Million. Cross-over boxing is also very popular with Mayweather versus MMA star Connor McGregor making over $620 Million in PPV sales. Even less known influencers like "Salt Papi" are packing arenas for professional bouts with other influencers with over 300,000 people watching from home. With the rise of this type of boxing, the sport has reached brand new audiences.

== Rules ==
The Marquess of Queensberry Rules have been the general rules governing modern boxing since their publication in 1867.

A boxing match typically consists of a determined number of three-minute rounds, a total of up to 9 to 12 rounds with a minute spent between each round with the fighters resting in their assigned corners and receiving advice and attention from their coach and staff. The fight is controlled by a referee who works within the ring to judge and control the conduct of the fighters, rule on their ability to fight safely, count knocked-down fighters, and rule on fouls.

Up to three judges are typically present at ringside to score the bout and assign points to the boxers, based on punches and elbows that connect, defense, knockdowns, hugging and other, more subjective, measures. Because of the open-ended style of boxing judging, many fights have controversial results, in which one or both fighters believe they have been "robbed" or unfairly denied a victory. Each fighter has an assigned corner of the ring, where their coach, as well as one or more "seconds" may administer to the fighter at the beginning of the fight and between rounds. Each boxer enters into the ring from their assigned corners at the beginning of each round and must cease fighting and return to their corner at the signalled end of each round.

A bout in which the predetermined number of rounds passes is decided by the judges, and is said to "go the distance". The fighter with the higher score at the end of the fight is ruled the winner. With three judges, unanimous and split decisions are possible, as are draws. A boxer may win the bout before a decision is reached through a knock-out; such bouts are said to have ended "inside the distance". If a fighter is knocked down during the fight, determined by whether the boxer touches the canvas floor of the ring with any part of their body other than the feet as a result of the opponent's punch and not a slip, as determined by the referee, the referee begins counting until the fighter returns to their feet and can continue. Some jurisdictions require the referee to count to eight regardless of if the fighter gets up before.

Should the referee count to ten, then the knocked-down boxer is ruled "knocked out" (whether unconscious or not) and the other boxer is ruled the winner by knockout (KO). A "technical knock-out" (TKO) is possible as well, and is ruled by the referee, fight doctor, or a fighter's corner if a fighter is unable to safely continue to fight, based upon injuries or being judged unable to effectively defend themselves. Many jurisdictions and sanctioning agencies also have a "three-knockdown rule", in which three knockdowns in a given round result in a TKO. A TKO is considered a knockout in a fighter's record. A "standing eight" count rule may also be in effect. This gives the referee the right to step in and administer a count of eight to a fighter that the referee feels may be in danger, even if no knockdown has taken place. After counting the referee will observe the fighter, and decide if the fighter is fit to continue. For scoring purposes, a standing eight count is treated as a knockdown.

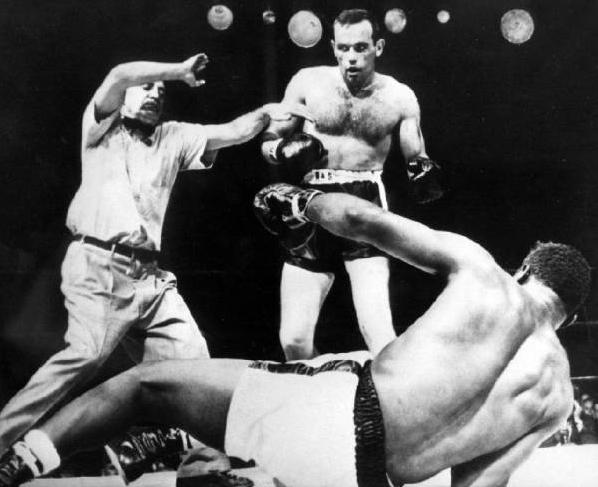
Ingemar Johansson of Sweden knocks out heavyweight champion Floyd Patterson on 26 June 1959

In general, boxers are prohibited from hitting below the belt, holding, tripping, pushing, biting, or spitting. The boxer's shorts are raised so the opponent is not allowed to hit to the groin area with intent to cause pain or injury. Failure to abide by the former may result in a foul. They also are prohibited from kicking, head-butting, or hitting with any part of the arm other than the knuckles of a closed fist (including hitting with the elbow, shoulder or forearm, as well as with open gloves, the wrist, the inside, back or side of the hand). They are prohibited as well from hitting the back, back of the head or neck (called a "rabbit-punch") or the kidneys. They are prohibited from holding the ropes for support when punching, holding an opponent while punching, or ducking below the belt of their opponent (dropping below the waist of your opponent, no matter the distance between).

If a "clinch" – a defensive move in which a boxer wraps their opponent's arms and holds on to create a pause – is broken by the referee, each fighter must take a full step back before punching again (alternatively, the referee may direct the fighters to "punch out" of the clinch). When a boxer is knocked down, the other boxer must immediately cease fighting and move to the furthest neutral corner of the ring until the referee has either ruled a knockout or called for the fight to continue.

Violations of these rules may be ruled "fouls" by the referee, who may issue warnings, deduct points, or disqualify an offending boxer, causing an automatic loss, depending on the seriousness and intentionality of the foul. An intentional foul that causes injury that prevents a fight from continuing usually causes the boxer who committed it to be disqualified. A fighter who suffers an accidental low-blow may be given up to five minutes to recover, after which they may be ruled knocked out if they are unable to continue. Accidental fouls that cause injury ending a bout may lead to a "no contest" result, or else cause the fight to go to a decision if enough rounds (typically four or more, or at least three in a four-round fight) have passed.

== Professional vs. amateur boxing ==
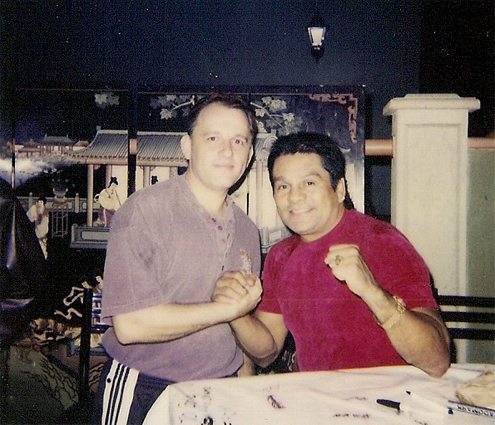
Roberto Durán (right), who held world championships in four weight classes: lightweight, welterweight, light middleweight and middleweight

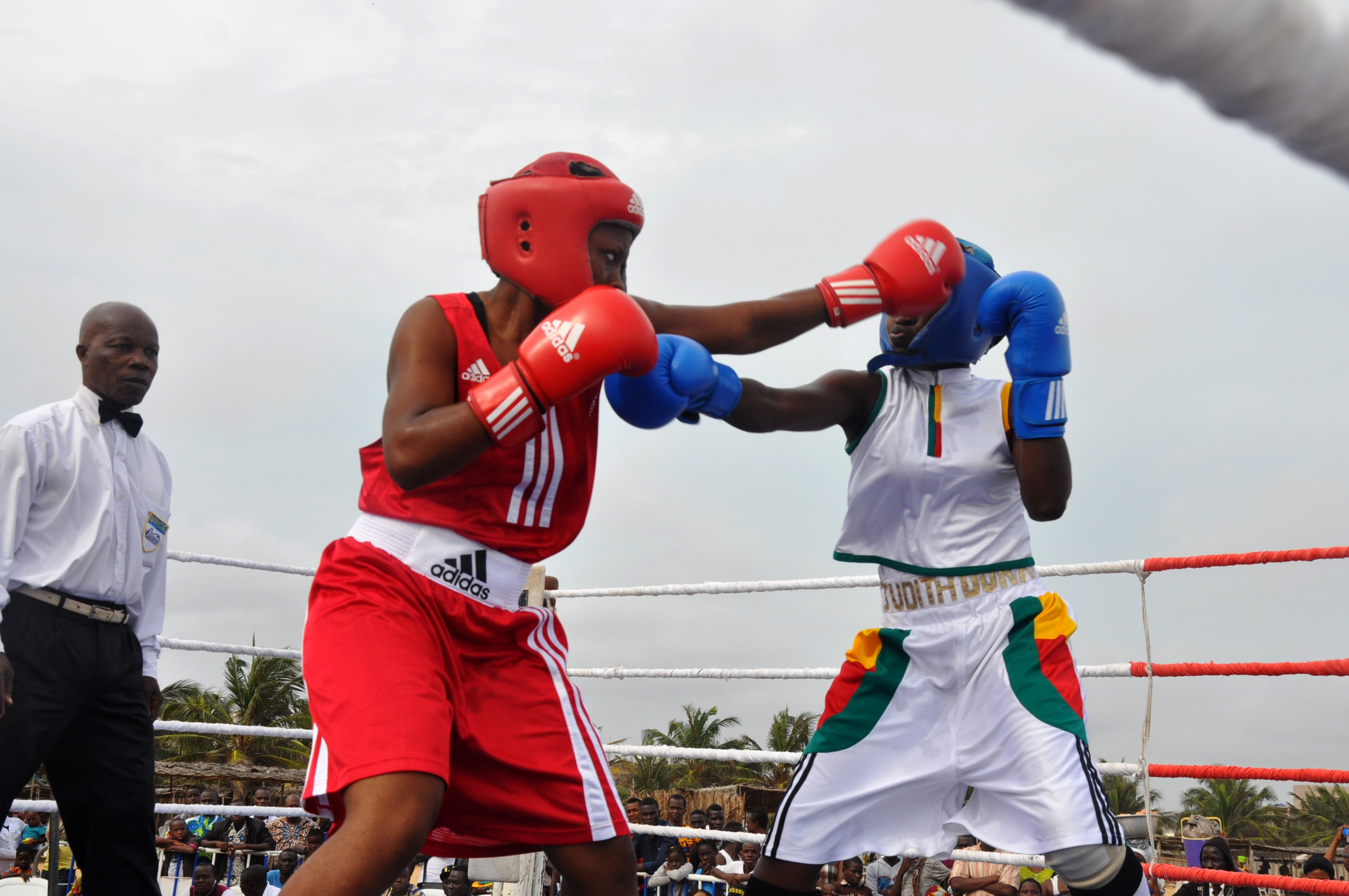
Women's Amateur Boxing

In their current form, Olympic and other amateur bouts are typically limited to three or four rounds, scoring is computed by points based on the number of clean blows landed, regardless of impact, and fighters wear protective headgear, reducing the number of injuries, knockdowns, and knockouts. Currently scoring blows in amateur boxing are subjectively counted by ringside judges, but the Australian Institute for Sport has demonstrated a prototype of an Automated Boxing Scoring System, which introduces scoring objectivity, improves safety, and arguably makes the sport more interesting to spectators. Professional boxing remains by far the most popular form of the sport globally, though amateur boxing is dominant in Cuba and some former Soviet republics. For most fighters, an amateur career, especially at the Olympics, serves to develop skills and gain experience in preparation for a professional career. Western boxers typically participate in one Olympics and then turn pro, while Cubans and boxers from other socialist countries have an opportunity to collect multiple medals. In 2016, professional boxers were admitted in the Olympic Games and other tournaments sanctioned by AIBA. This was done in part to level the playing field and give all of the athletes the same opportunities government-sponsored boxers from socialist countries and post-Soviet republics have. However, professional organizations strongly opposed that decision.

=== Amateur boxing ===
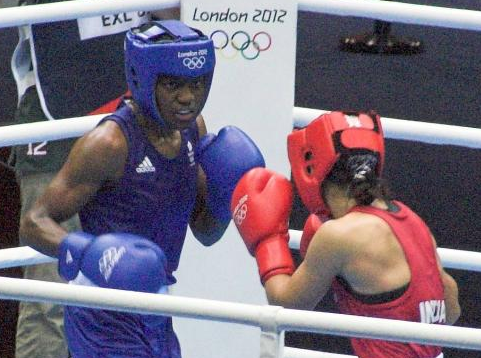
Nicola Adams (left), the first female boxer to win an Olympic gold medal, with Mary Kom of India

Amateur boxing may be found at the collegiate level, at the Olympic Games, Commonwealth Games, Asian Games, etc. In many other venues sanctioned by amateur boxing associations. Amateur boxing has a point scoring system that measures the number of clean blows landed rather than physical damage. Bouts consist of three rounds of three minutes in the Olympic and Commonwealth Games, and three rounds of three minutes in a national ABA (Amateur Boxing Association) bout, each with a one-minute interval between rounds.

Competitors wear protective headgear and gloves with a white strip or circle across the knuckle. There are cases however, where white ended gloves are not required but any solid color may be worn. The white end is just a way to make it easier for judges to score clean hits. Each competitor must have their hands properly wrapped, pre-fight, for added protection on their hands and for added cushion under the gloves. Gloves worn by the fighters must be twelve ounces in weight unless the fighters weigh under 165 pounds (75 kg), thus allowing them to wear ten ounce gloves. A punch is considered a scoring punch only when the boxers connect with the white portion of the gloves. Each punch that lands cleanly on the head or torso with sufficient force is awarded a point. A referee monitors the fight to ensure that competitors use only legal blows. A belt worn over the torso represents the lower limit of punches – any boxer repeatedly landing low blows below the belt is disqualified. Referees also ensure that the boxers don't use holding tactics to prevent the opponent from swinging. If this occurs, the referee separates the opponents and orders them to continue boxing. Repeated holding can result in a boxer being penalized or ultimately disqualified. Referees will stop the bout if a boxer is seriously injured, if one boxer is significantly dominating the other or if the score is severely imbalanced. Amateur bouts which end this way may be noted as "RSC" (referee stopped contest) with notations for an outclassed opponent (RSCO), outscored opponent (RSCOS), injury (RSCI) or head injury (RSCH).

=== Professional boxing ===
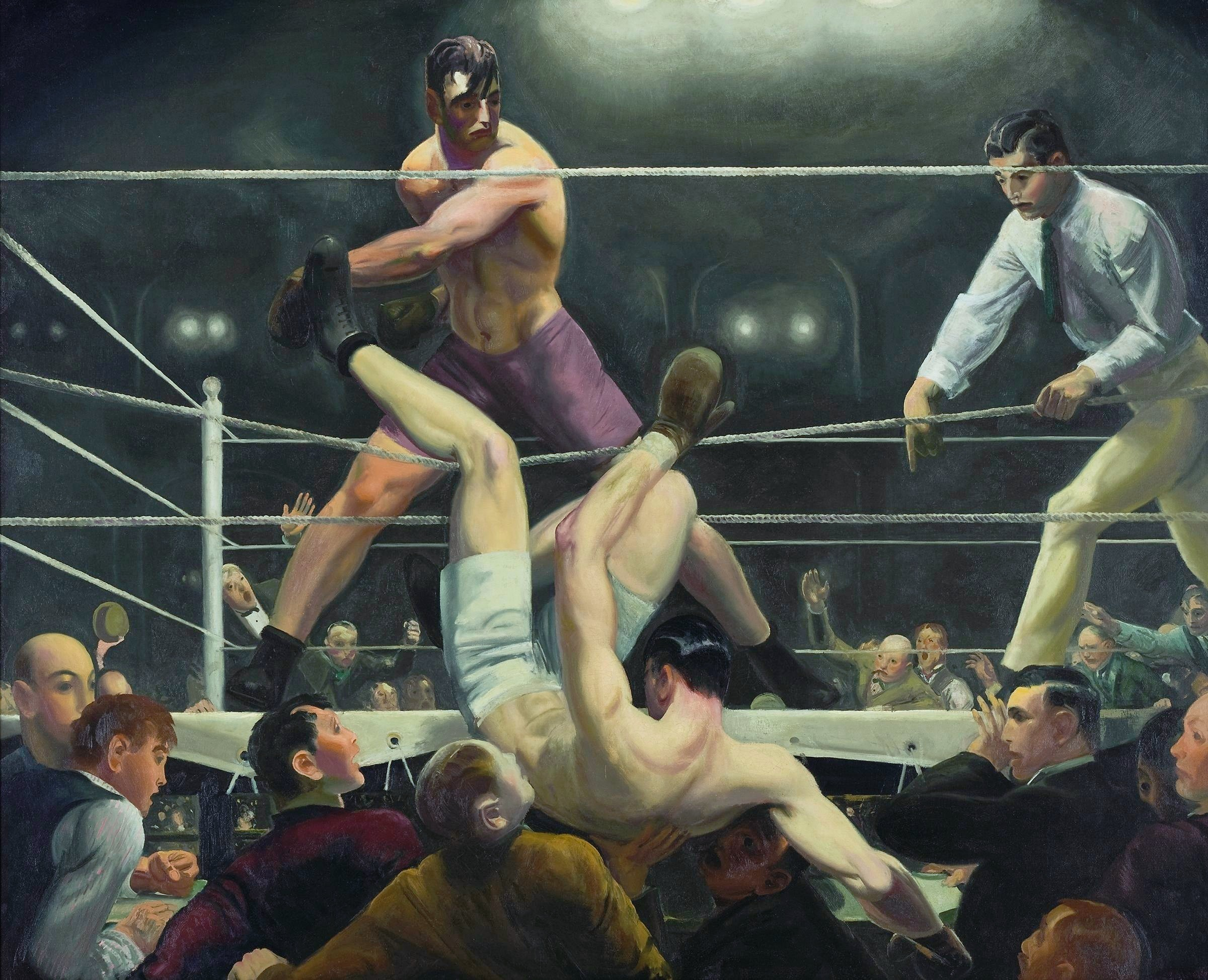
Luis Ángel Firpo sending Jack Dempsey outside the ring illustrated in a June 1924 painting by George Bellows

Professional bouts are usually much longer than amateur bouts, typically ranging from ten to twelve rounds, though four-round fights are common for less experienced fighters or club fighters. There are also some two- and three-round professional bouts, especially in Australia. Through the early 20th century, it was common for fights to have unlimited rounds, ending only when one fighter quit, benefiting high-energy fighters like Jack Dempsey. Fifteen rounds remained the internationally recognized limit for championship fights for most of the 20th century until the early 1980s, when the death of boxer Kim Duk-koo eventually prompted the World Boxing Council and other organizations sanctioning professional boxing to reduce the limit to twelve rounds.

Headgear is not permitted in professional bouts, and boxers are generally allowed to take much more damage before a fight is halted. At any time, the referee may stop the contest if he believes that one participant cannot defend himself due to injury. In that case, the other participant is awarded a technical knockout win. A technical knockout would also be awarded if a fighter lands a punch that opens a cut on the opponent, and the opponent is later deemed not fit to continue by a doctor because of the cut. For this reason, fighters often employ cutmen, whose job is to treat cuts between rounds so that the boxer is able to continue despite the cut. If a boxer simply quits fighting, or if his corner stops the fight, then the winning boxer is also awarded a technical knockout victory. In contrast with amateur boxing, professional male boxers have to be bare-chested.

== Boxing styles ==
=== Definition of style ===
"Style" is often defined as the strategic approach a fighter takes during a bout. No two fighters' styles are alike, as each is determined by that individual's physical and mental attributes. Four main styles exist in boxing: In-Fighter, Out-Boxer, Slugger and Boxer-Puncher. These styles may be divided into several special subgroups, such as counter puncher, etc. The main philosophy of the styles is, that each style has an advantage over one, but disadvantage over the other one. It follows the rock paper scissors scenario – boxer beats brawler, brawler beats swarmer, and swarmer beats boxer.

==== Boxer/out-fighter ====
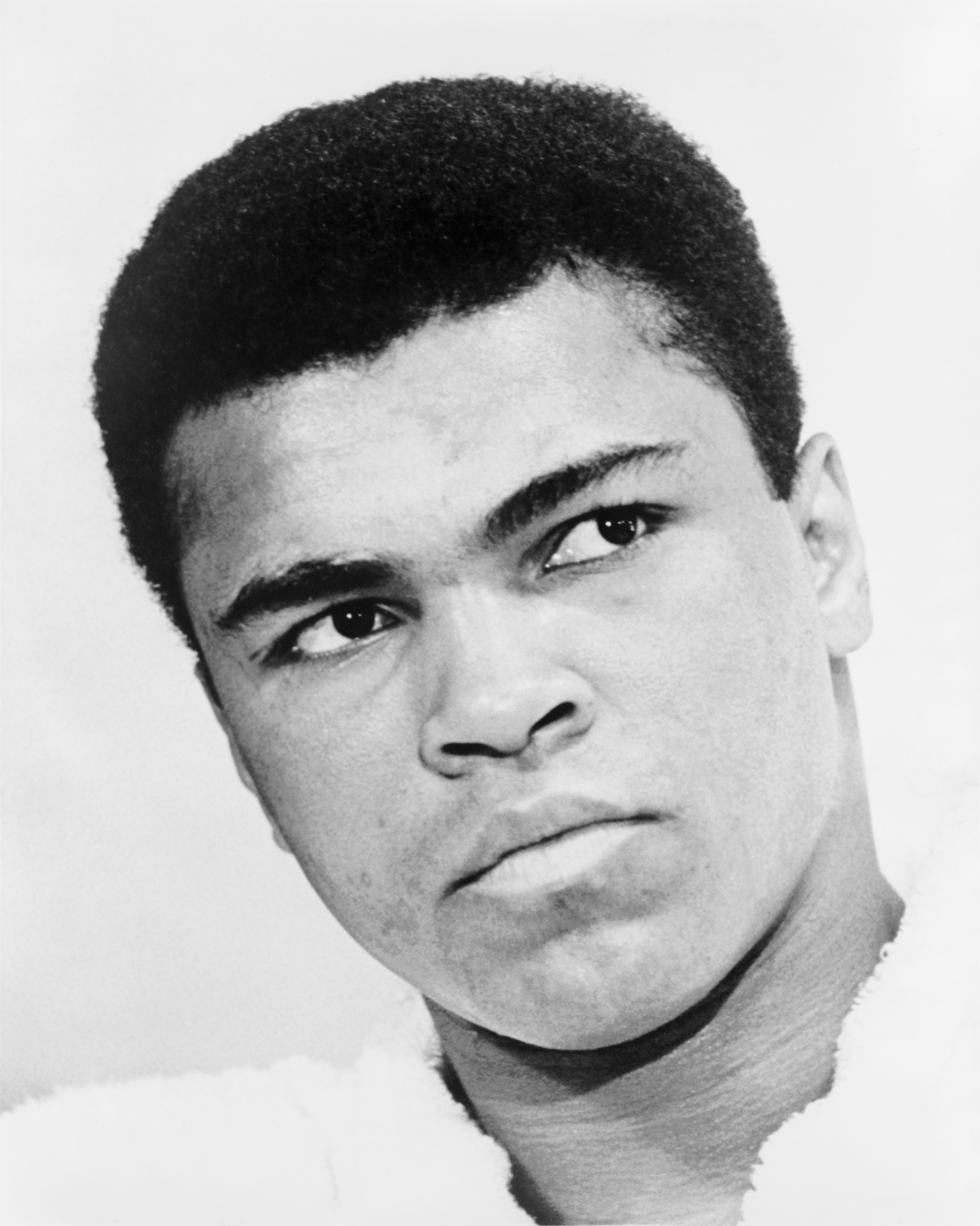
Heavyweight champion Muhammad Ali in 1967, a typical example of an out-fighter

A classic "boxer" or stylist (also known as an "out-fighter") seeks to maintain distance between himself and his opponent, fighting with faster, longer range punches, most notably the jab, and gradually wearing his opponent down. Due to this reliance on weaker punches, out-fighters tend to win by point decisions rather than by knockout, though some out-fighters have notable knockout records. They are often regarded as the best boxing strategists due to their ability to control the pace of the fight and lead their opponent, methodically wearing them down and exhibiting more skill and finesse than a brawler. Out-fighters need reach, hand speed, reflexes, and footwork.

Notable out-fighters include Muhammad Ali, Larry Holmes, Joe Calzaghe, Wilfredo Gómez, Salvador Sánchez, Cecilia Brækhus, Gene Tunney, Ezzard Charles, Willie Pep, Meldrick Taylor, Ricardo "Finito" López, Floyd Mayweather Jr., Roy Jones Jr., Sugar Ray Leonard, Miguel Vázquez, Sergio "Maravilla" Martínez, Wladimir Klitschko and Guillermo Rigondeaux. This style was also used by Olympic boxer Sydney Greve and fictional boxer Apollo Creed.

==== Boxer-puncher ====
A boxer-puncher is a well-rounded boxer who is able to fight at close range with a combination of technique and power, often with the ability to knock opponents out with a combination and in some instances a single shot. Their movement and tactics are similar to that of an out-fighter (although they are generally not as mobile as an out-fighter), but instead of winning by decision, they tend to wear their opponents down using combinations and then move in to score the knockout. A boxer must be well rounded to be effective using this style.

Notable boxer-punchers include Muhammad Ali, Canelo Álvarez, Sugar Ray Leonard, Roy Jones Jr., Wladimir Klitschko, Vasyl Lomachenko, Lennox Lewis, Joe Louis, Wilfredo Gómez, Oscar De La Hoya, Archie Moore, Miguel Cotto, Nonito Donaire, Sam Langford, Henry Armstrong, Sugar Ray Robinson, Tony Zale, Carlos Monzón, Alexis Argüello, Érik Morales, Terry Norris, Marco Antonio Barrera, Naseem Hamed, Thomas Hearns, Julian Jackson and Gennady Golovkin.

==== Brawler/slugger ====
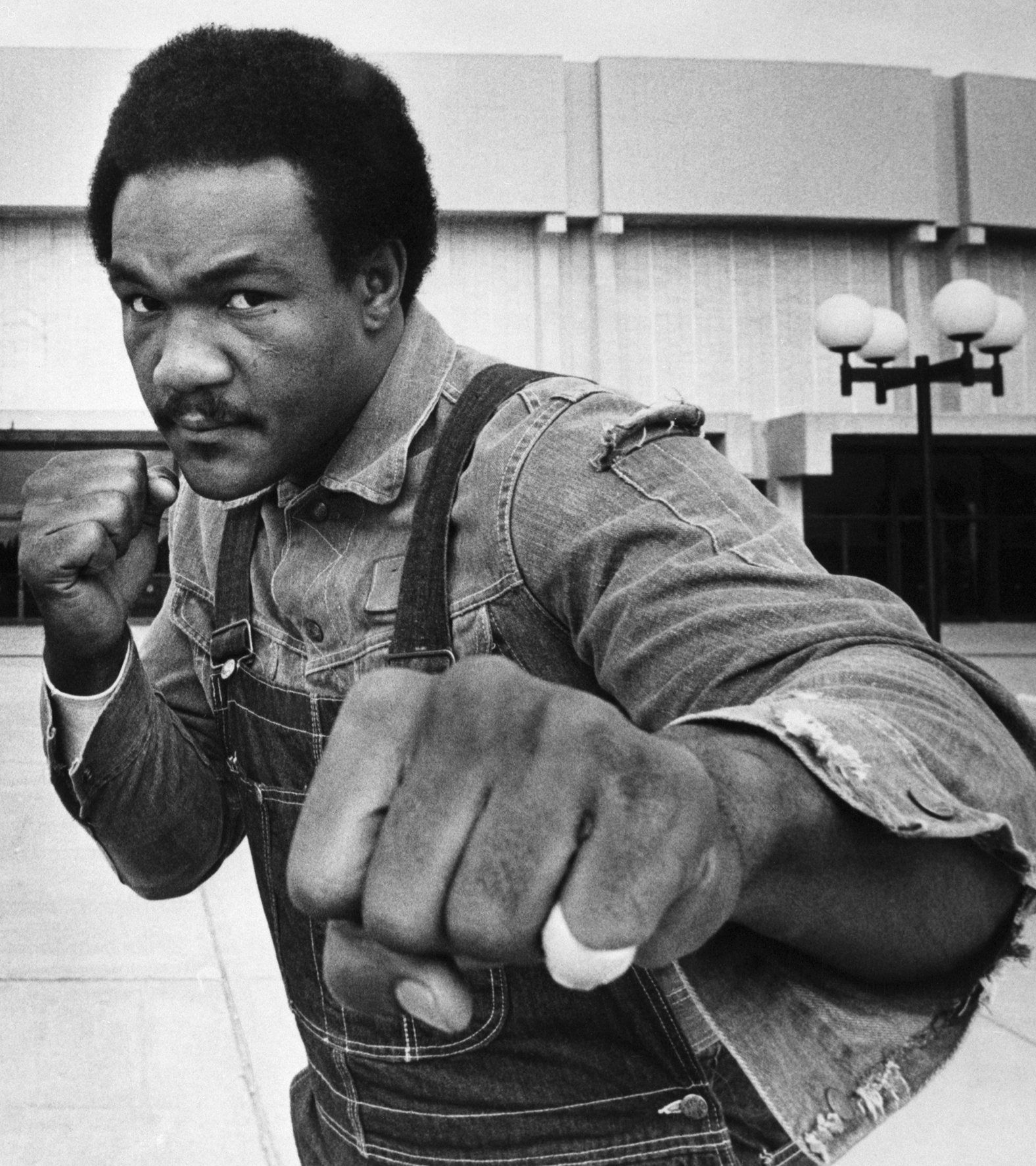
George Foreman, a two-time heavyweight champion and former Olympic gold medalist, in 2009

A brawler is a fighter who generally lacks finesse and footwork in the ring, but makes up for it through sheer punching power. Many brawlers tend to lack mobility, preferring a less mobile, more stable platform and have difficulty pursuing fighters who are fast on their feet. They may also have a tendency to ignore combination punching in favor of continuous beat-downs with one hand and by throwing slower, more powerful single punches (such as hooks and uppercuts). Their slowness and predictable punching pattern (single punches with obvious leads) often leaves them open to counter punches, so successful brawlers must be able to absorb a substantial amount of punishment. However, not all brawler/slugger fighters are not mobile; some can move around and switch styles if needed but still have the brawler/slugger style such as Wilfredo Gómez, Prince Naseem Hamed and Danny García.

A brawler's most important assets are power and chin (the ability to absorb punishment while remaining able to continue boxing). Examples of this style include George Foreman, Rocky Marciano, Jack Dempsey, Riddick Bowe, Danny García, Wilfredo Gómez, Sonny Liston, John L. Sullivan, Max Baer, Prince Naseem Hamed, Ray Mancini, David Tua, Arturo Gatti, Micky Ward, Brandon Ríos, Ruslan Provodnikov, Michael Katsidis, James Kirkland, Marcos Maidana, Vitali Klitschko, Jake LaMotta, Manny Pacquiao, and Ireland's John Duddy. This style of boxing was also used by fictional boxers Rocky Balboa and James "Clubber" Lang.

Brawlers tend to be more predictable and easy to hit but usually fare well enough against other fighting styles because they train to take punches very well. They often have a higher chance than other fighting styles to score a knockout against their opponents because they focus on landing big, powerful hits, instead of smaller, faster attacks. Oftentimes they place focus on training on their upper body instead of their entire body, to increase power and endurance. They also aim to intimidate their opponents because of their power, stature and ability to take a punch.

==== Swarmer/in-fighter ====
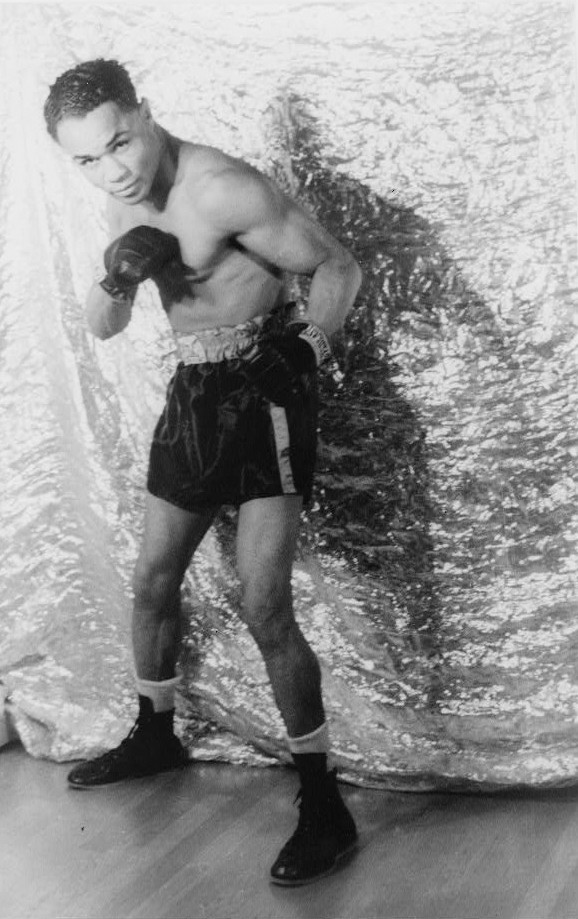
Henry Armstrong, known for his aggressive, non-stop assault style of fighting

In-fighters/swarmers (sometimes called "pressure fighters") attempt to stay close to an opponent, throwing intense flurries and combinations of hooks and uppercuts. Mainly Mexican, Irish, Irish-American, Puerto Rican, and Mexican-American boxers popularized this style. A successful in-fighter often needs a good "chin" because swarming usually involves being hit with many jabs before they can maneuver inside where they are more effective. In-fighters operate best at close range because they are generally shorter and have less reach than their opponents and thus are more effective at a short distance where the longer arms of their opponents make punching awkward. However, several fighters tall for their division have been relatively adept at in-fighting as well as out-fighting.

The essence of a swarmer is non-stop aggression. Many short in-fighters use their stature to their advantage, employing a bob-and-weave defense by bending at the waist to slip underneath or to the sides of incoming punches. Unlike blocking, causing an opponent to miss a punch disrupts his balance, this permits forward movement past the opponent's extended arm and keeps the hands free to counter. A distinct advantage that in-fighters have is when throwing uppercuts, they can channel their entire bodyweight behind the punch; Mike Tyson was famous for throwing devastating uppercuts. Marvin Hagler was known for his hard "chin", punching power, body attack and the stalking of his opponents. Some in-fighters, like Mike Tyson, have been known for being notoriously hard to hit. The key to a swarmer is aggression, endurance, chin, and bobbing-and-weaving.

Notable in-fighters include Henry Armstrong, Aaron Pryor, Julio César Chávez, Jack Dempsey, Shawn Porter, Miguel Cotto, Gennady Golovkin, Joe Frazier, Danny García, Mike Tyson, Manny Pacquiao, Rocky Marciano, Wayne McCullough, James Braddock, Gerry Penalosa, Harry Greb, David Tua, James Toney and Ricky Hatton.

===== Counter puncher =====
Counter punchers are slippery, defensive style fighters who often rely on their opponent's mistakes in order to gain the advantage, whether it be on the score cards or more preferably a knockout. They use their well-rounded defense to avoid or block shots and then immediately catch the opponent off guard with a well placed and timed punch. A fight with a skilled counter-puncher can turn into a war of attrition, where each shot landed is a battle in itself. Thus, fighting against counter punchers requires constant feinting and the ability to avoid telegraphing one's attacks. To be truly successful using this style they must have good reflexes, a high level of prediction and awareness, pinpoint accuracy and speed, both in striking and in footwork.

Notable counter punchers include Muhammad Ali, Joe Calzaghe, Vitali Klitschko, Evander Holyfield, Max Schmeling, Chris Byrd, Jim Corbett, Jack Johnson, Bernard Hopkins, Laszlo Papp, Jerry Quarry, Anselmo Moreno, James Toney, Marvin Hagler, Juan Manuel Márquez, Humberto Soto, Floyd Mayweather Jr., Roger Mayweather, Pernell Whitaker, Sergio Martínez and Guillermo Rigondeaux. This style of boxing is also used by fictional boxer Little Mac.

Counter punchers usually wear their opponents down by causing them to miss their punches. The more the opponent misses, the faster they tire, and the psychological effects of being unable to land a hit will start to sink in. The counter puncher often tries to outplay their opponent entirely, not just in a physical sense, but also in a mental and emotional sense. This style can be incredibly difficult, especially against seasoned fighters, but winning a fight without getting hit is often worth the pay-off. They usually try to stay away from the center of the ring, in order to outmaneuver and chip away at their opponents. A large advantage in counter-hitting is the forward momentum of the attacker, which drives them further into your return strike. As such, knockouts are more common than one would expect from a defensive style.

=== Combinations of styles ===
All fighters have primary skills with which they feel most comfortable, but truly elite fighters are often able to incorporate auxiliary styles when presented with a particular challenge. For example, an out-fighter will sometimes plant his feet and counter punch, or a slugger may have the stamina to pressure fight with his power punches.

Old history of the development of boxing and its prevalence contribute to fusion of various types of martial arts and the emergence of new ones that are based on them. For example, a combination of boxing and sportive sambo techniques gave rise to a combat sambo.

=== Style matchups ===
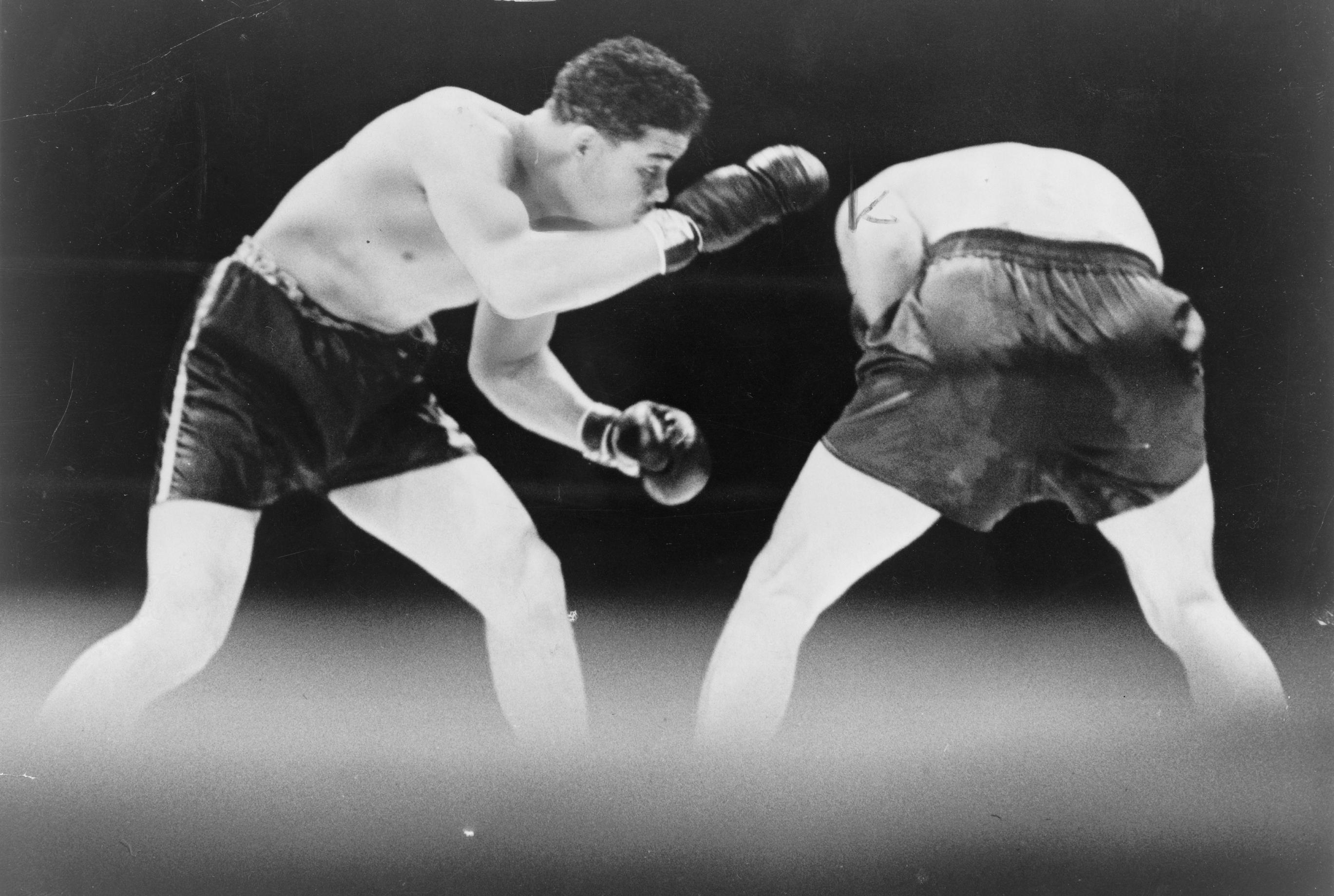
Louis vs. Schmeling in 1936

There is a generally accepted rule of thumb about the success each of these boxing styles has against the others. In general, an in-fighter has an advantage over an out-fighter, an out-fighter has an advantage over a brawler, and a brawler has an advantage over an in-fighter; these form a cycle with each style being stronger relative to one, and weaker relative to another, with none dominating, as in rock paper scissors. Naturally, many other factors, such as the skill level and training of the combatants, determine the outcome of a fight, but the widely held belief in this relationship among the styles is embodied in the cliché amongst boxing fans and writers that "styles make fights".

Brawlers tend to overcome swarmers or in-fighters because, in trying to get close to the slugger, the in-fighter will invariably have to walk straight into the guns of the much harder-hitting brawler, so, unless the former has a very good chin and the latter's stamina is poor, the brawler's superior power will carry the day. A famous example of this type of match-up advantage would be George Foreman's knockout victory over Joe Frazier in their original bout "The Sunshine Showdown".

Although in-fighters struggle against heavy sluggers, they typically enjoy more success against out-fighters or boxers. Out-fighters prefer a slower fight, with some distance between themselves and the opponent. The in-fighter tries to close that gap and unleash furious flurries. On the inside, the out-fighter loses a lot of his combat effectiveness, because he cannot throw the hard punches. The in-fighter is generally successful in this case, due to his intensity in advancing on his opponent and his good agility, which makes him difficult to evade. For example, the swarming Joe Frazier, though easily dominated by the slugger George Foreman, was able to create many more problems for the boxer Muhammad Ali in their three fights. Joe Louis, after retirement, admitted that he hated being crowded, and that swarmers like untied/undefeated champ Rocky Marciano would have caused him style problems even in his prime.

The boxer or out-fighter tends to be most successful against a brawler, whose slow speed (both hand and foot) and poor technique make him an easy target for the faster out-fighter. The out-fighter's main concern is to stay alert, as the brawler only needs to land one good punch to finish the fight. If the out-fighter can avoid those power punches, he can often wear the brawler down with fast jabs, tiring him out. If he is successful enough, he may even apply extra pressure in the later rounds in an attempt to achieve a knockout. Most classic boxers, such as Muhammad Ali, enjoyed their best successes against sluggers.

An example of a style matchup was the historical fight of Julio César Chávez, a swarmer or in-fighter, against Meldrick Taylor, the boxer or out-fighter (see Julio César Chávez vs. Meldrick Taylor). The match was nicknamed "Thunder Meets Lightning" as an allusion to punching power of Chávez and blinding speed of Taylor. Chávez was the epitome of the "Mexican" style of boxing. Taylor's hand and foot speed and boxing abilities gave him the early advantage, allowing him to begin building a large lead on points. Chávez remained relentless in his pursuit of Taylor and due to his greater punching power Chávez slowly punished Taylor. Coming into the later rounds, Taylor was bleeding from the mouth, his entire face was swollen, the bones around his eye socket had been broken, he had swallowed a considerable amount of his own blood, and as he grew tired, Taylor was increasingly forced into exchanging blows with Chávez, which only gave Chávez a greater chance to cause damage. While there was little doubt that Taylor had solidly won the first three quarters of the fight, the question at hand was whether he would survive the final quarter. Going into the final round, Taylor held a secure lead on the scorecards of two of the three judges. Chávez would have to knock Taylor out to claim a victory, whereas Taylor merely needed to stay away from the Mexican legend. However, Taylor did not stay away, but continued to trade blows with Chávez. As he did so, Taylor showed signs of extreme exhaustion, and every tick of the clock brought Taylor closer to victory unless Chávez could knock him out. With about a minute left in the round, Chávez hit Taylor squarely with several hard punches and stayed on the attack, continuing to hit Taylor with well-placed shots. Finally, with about 25 seconds to go, Chávez landed a hard right hand that caused Taylor to stagger forward towards a corner, forcing Chávez back ahead of him. Suddenly Chávez stepped around Taylor, positioning him so that Taylor was trapped in the corner, with no way to escape from Chávez' desperate final flurry. Chávez then nailed Taylor with a tremendous right hand that dropped the younger man. By using the ring ropes to pull himself up, Taylor managed to return to his feet and was given the mandatory 8-count. Referee Richard Steele asked Taylor twice if he was able to continue fighting, but Taylor failed to answer. Steele then concluded that Taylor was unfit to continue and signaled that he was ending the fight, resulting in a TKO victory for Chávez with only two seconds to go in the bout.

== Equipment ==
Since boxing involves forceful, repetitive punching, precautions must be taken to prevent damage to bones in the hand. Most trainers do not allow boxers to train and spar without wrist wraps and boxing gloves. Hand wraps are used to secure the bones in the hand, and the gloves are used to protect the hands from blunt injury, allowing boxers to throw punches with more force than if they did not use them.

=== Gloves ===
Gloves have been required in competition since the late nineteenth century, though modern boxing gloves are much heavier than those worn by early twentieth-century fighters. Prior to a bout, both boxers agree upon the weight of gloves to be used in the bout, with the understanding that lighter gloves allow heavy punchers to inflict more damage. The brand of gloves can also affect the impact of punches, so this too is usually stipulated before a bout. Both sides are allowed to inspect the wraps and gloves of the opponent to help ensure both are within agreed upon specifications and no tampering has taken place.

=== Mouth guard ===
A mouthguard is important to protect the teeth and gums from injury, and to cushion the jaw, resulting in a decreased chance of knockout.

=== Boxing shoes ===
Both fighters must wear soft soled shoes to reduce the damage from accidental (or intentional) stepping on feet. While older boxing boots more commonly resembled those of a professional wrestler, modern boxing shoes and boots tend to be quite similar to their amateur wrestling counterparts.

=== Punching bag ===
Boxers practice their skills on several types of punching bags. A small, tear-drop-shaped "speed bag" is used to hone reflexes and repetitive punching skills, while a large cylindrical "heavy bag" filled with sand, a synthetic substitute, or water is used to practice power punching and body blows. The double-end bag is usually connected by elastic on the top and bottom and moves randomly upon getting struck and helps the fighter work on accuracy and reflexes. In addition to these distinctive pieces of equipment, boxers also use sport-nonspecific training equipment to build strength, speed, agility, and stamina. Common training equipment includes free weights, rowing machines, jump rope, and medicine balls.

Boxers also use punch/focus mitts in which a trainer calls out certain combinations and the fighter strikes the mitts accordingly. This is a great exercise for stamina as the boxer isn't allowed to go at his own pace but that of the trainer, typically forcing the fighter to endure a higher output and volume than usual. In addition, they also allow trainers to make boxers utilize footwork and distances more accurately. Recently boxing clubs have started using something called music boxing machines to train newbies in a more musical way to gain rhythm.

Boxing matches typically take place in a boxing ring, a raised platform surrounded by ropes attached to posts rising in each corner. The term "ring" has come to be used as a metaphor for many aspects of prize fighting in general.

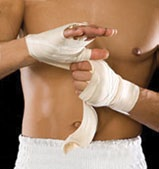
Boxer with hand wraps

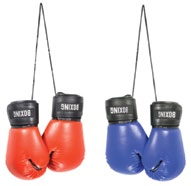
Boxing gloves

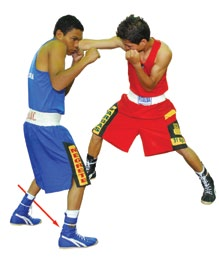
Boxing footwear

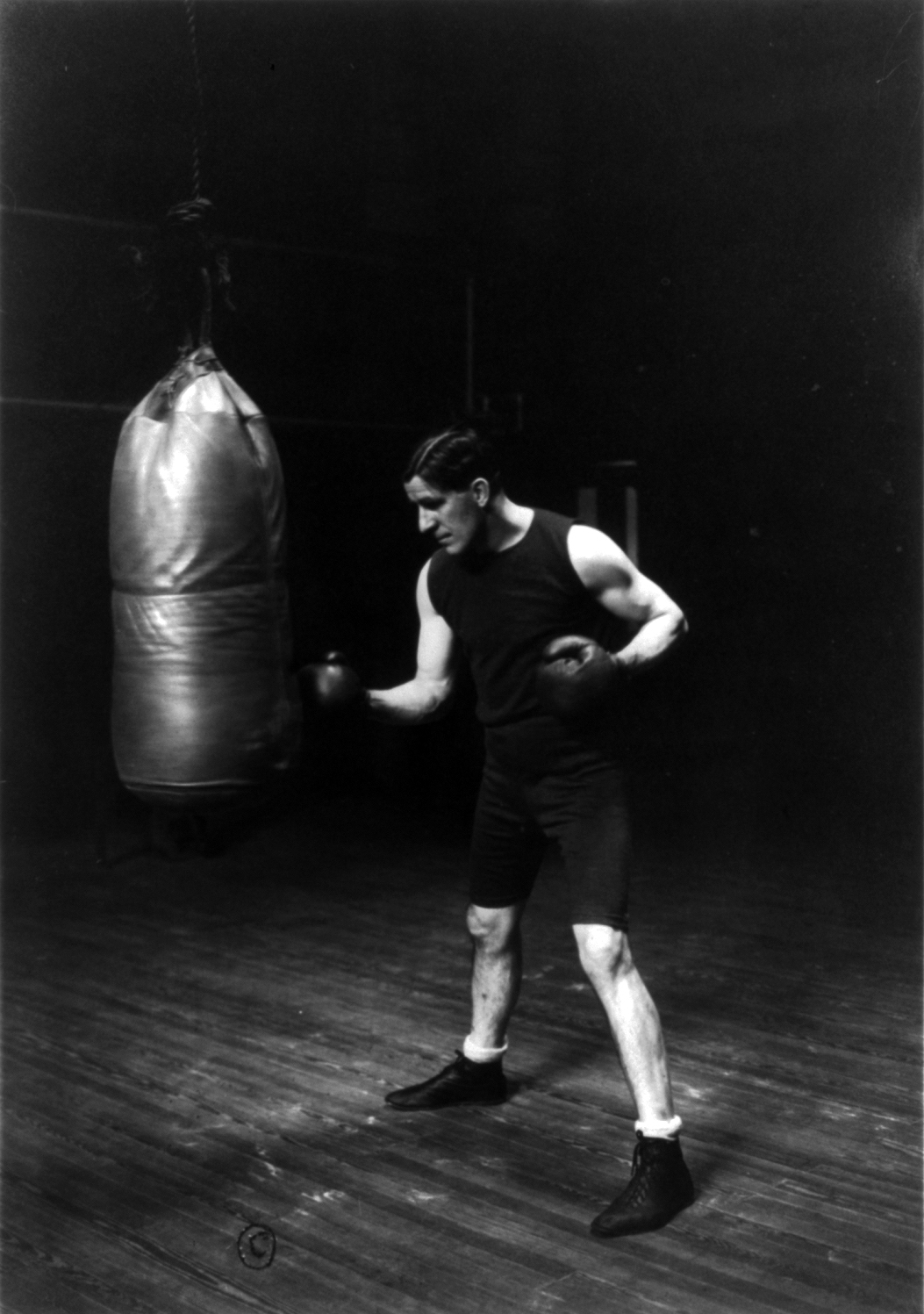
James J. Corbett hitting a heavy bag, 1900.

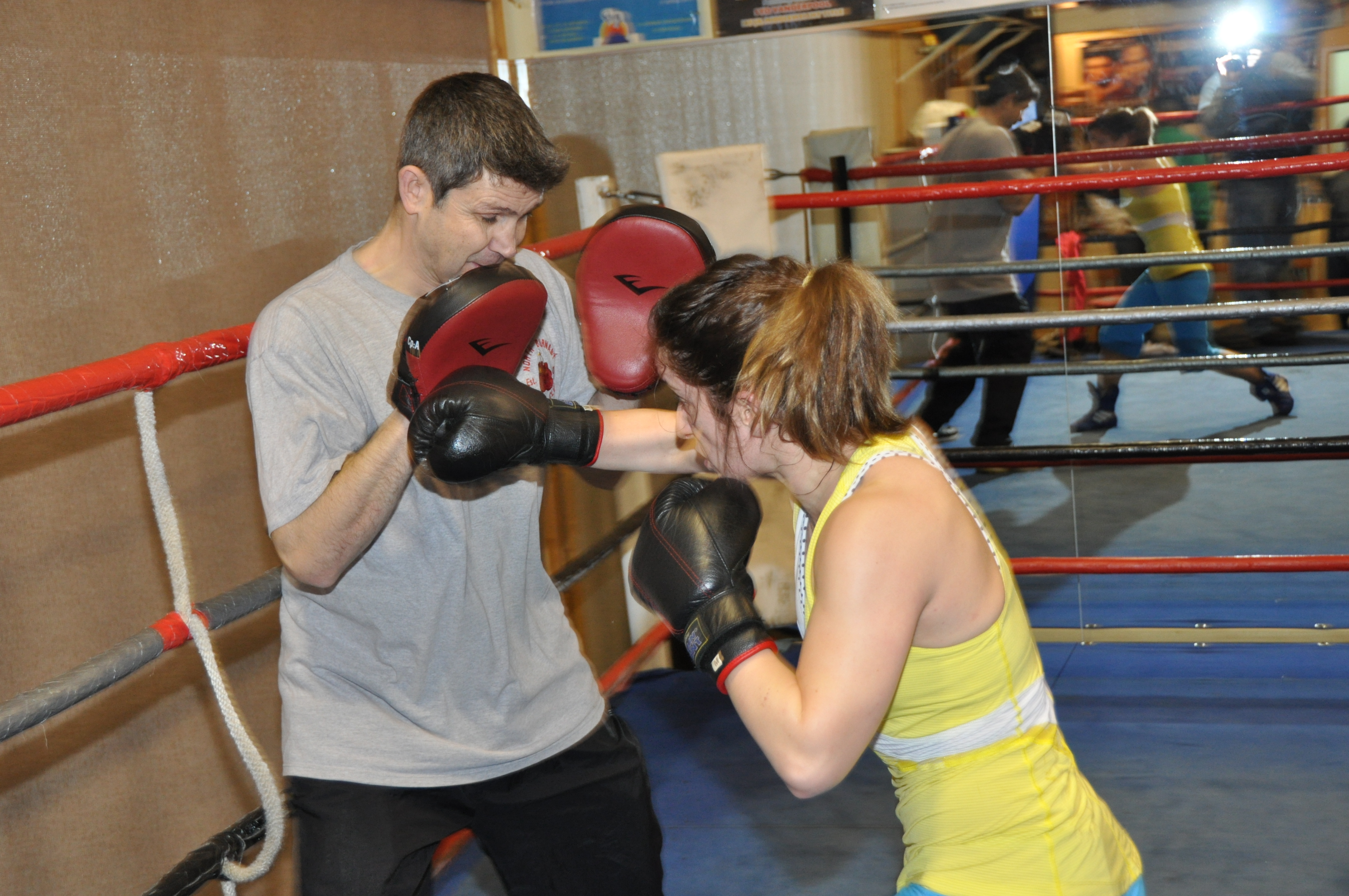
Boxer hitting focus mitts

== Technique ==
=== Stance ===
The modern boxing stance differs substantially from the typical boxing stances of the 19th and early 20th centuries. The modern stance has a more upright vertical-armed guard, as opposed to the more horizontal, knuckles-facing-forward guard adopted by early 20th century hook users such as Jack Johnson.

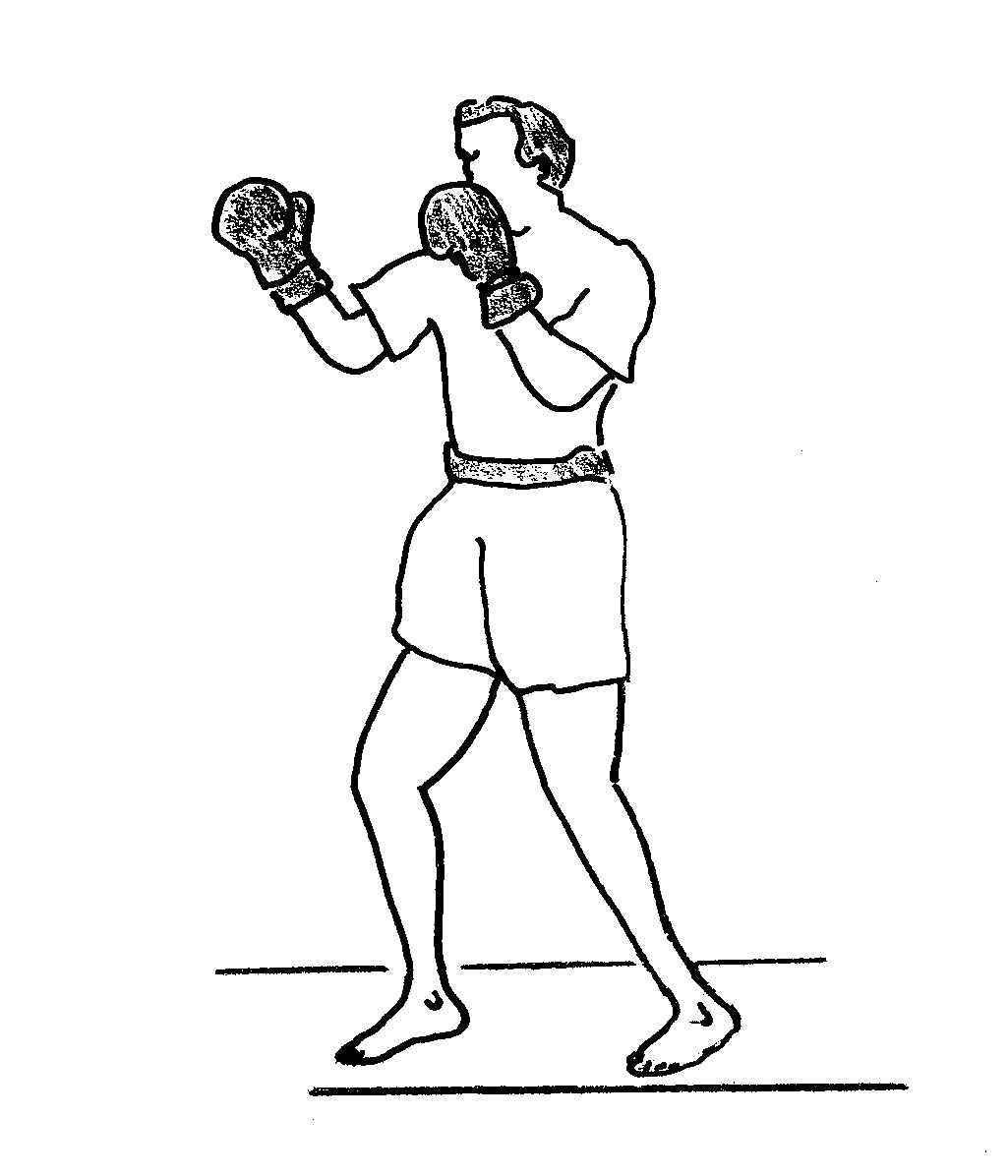
Upright stance

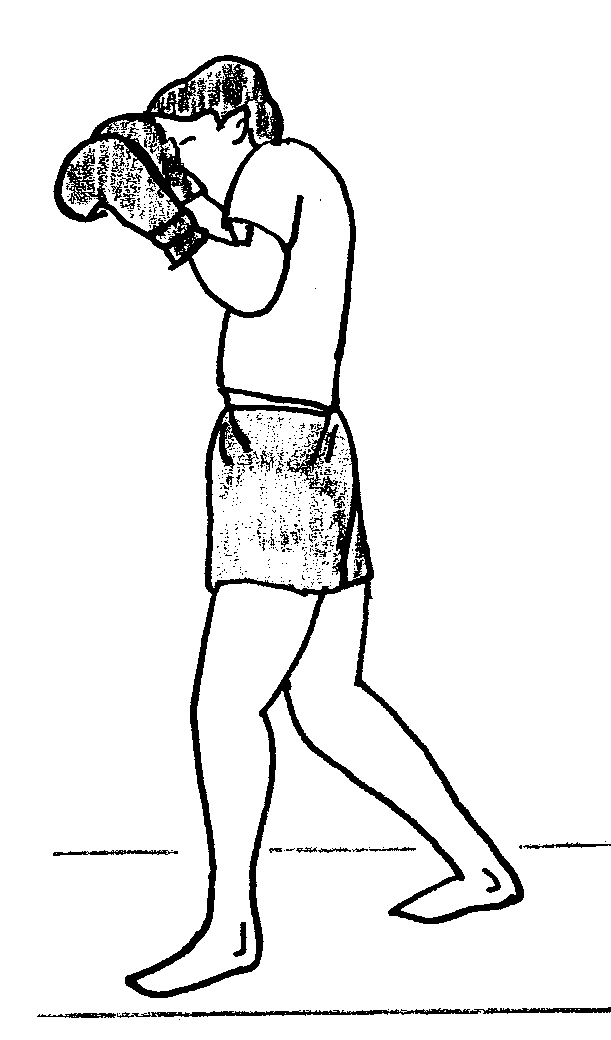
Semi-crouch

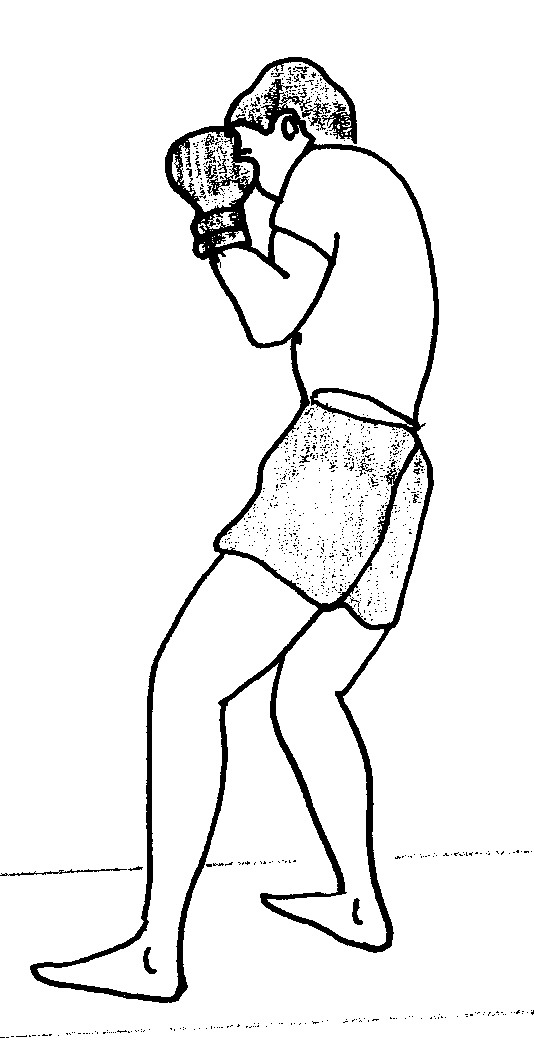
Full crouch

Upright stance – In a fully upright stance, the boxer stands with the legs shoulder-width apart and the rear foot a half-step in front of the lead man. Right-handed or orthodox boxers lead with the left foot and fist (for most penetration power). Both feet are parallel, and the right heel is off the ground. The lead (left) fist is held vertically about six inches in front of the face at eye level. The rear (right) fist is held beside the chin and the elbow tucked against the ribcage to protect the body. The chin is tucked into the chest to avoid punches to the jaw which commonly cause knock-outs and is often kept slightly off-center. Wrists are slightly bent to avoid damage when punching and the elbows are kept tucked in to protect the ribcage.

Crouching stance – Some boxers fight from a crouch, leaning forward and keeping their feet closer together. The stance described is considered the "textbook" stance and fighters are encouraged to change it around once it's been mastered as a base. Case in point, many fast fighters have their hands down and have almost exaggerated footwork, while brawlers or bully fighters tend to slowly stalk their opponents. In order to retain their stance boxers take 'the first step in any direction with the foot already leading in that direction.'

Different stances allow boxers to position and distribute their bodyweight differently; this alteration can affect the power and explosiveness with which a punch is delivered. For instance, a crouched stance allows for the bodyweight to be positioned further forward over the lead left leg. If a lead left hook is thrown from this position, it will produce a powerful springing action in the lead leg and produce a more explosive punch. This springing action could not be generated effectively, for this punch, if an upright stance was used or if the bodyweight was positioned predominantly over the back leg. Mike Tyson was a keen practitioner of a crouched stance and this style of power punching. The preparatory positioning of the bodyweight over the bent lead leg is also known as an isometric preload.

Orthodox stance refers to a stance where the left leg, and usually the left arm, is forward.

Southpaw stance – refers to a stance where the right leg, and usually the right arm, is forward. Left-handed or southpaw fighters use a mirror image of the orthodox stance, which can create problems for orthodox fighters unaccustomed to receiving jabs, hooks, or crosses from the opposite side. The southpaw stance, conversely, is vulnerable to a straight right hand.

Open stance - refers to when one fighter is in an orthodox stance and the other is in a southpaw stance.

Closed stance - refers to when both fighters are in orthodox stances or both fighters are in southpaw stances.

Square stance – North American fighters tend to favor a more balanced stance, facing the opponent almost squarely.

Bladed stance – many European fighters stand with their torso turned more to the side. The positioning of the hands may also vary, as some fighters prefer to have both hands raised in front of the face, risking exposure to body shots.

=== Footwork ===
Footwork in boxing refers to the boxer's movement around the ring and how they set their feet in order to punch, block and dodge. They must be ready to switch between stepping and striking very quickly. How a boxer uses their feet is related to the boxing stance which they are in. For an orthodox right-handed boxer who has a left foot forward stance, they will standardly step forward first with their left foot and then follow with their right. When they move backwards, they will first step backwards with their right foot and then their left foot. And vice versa for unorthodox south-paw fighters. For leftwards movement, both orthodox and unorthodox fighters will typically move their left foot first and then their right foot. And for rightwards movement their right foot first and then their left foot.

Boxers always strive to be very light-footed in their movement around the ring. This enables them to move quickly in and out of range and position themselves to attack from different angles. The importance of being light-footed, and the extent to which some fighters achieve it, is demonstrated by Muhammad Ali and Sugar Ray Robinson who were said to be so light-footed that they floated around the ring.

When a boxer strikes they set themselves to do so. This involves planting their feet which means pushing firmly into the ground to ensure that they are in a stable stance. This additional surety of foot placement gives them a stronger base of support to strike from. The feet are not just planted before a punch but also during it. This is especially the case with power punches. The very fast planting of the feet as a part of the punch makes it more powerful and explosive. The boxer must therefore decide how much they want to plant their feet before the punch in order to be in a strong posture to strike from, and how much they want to plant their feet as a concurrent part of the punch. The ability to move very lightly on their feet one moment and then suddenly plant them in order to strike the next is one of the main skills a boxer needs to develop.

=== Punches ===
There are eight basic punches in boxing, with six of them: the jab, cross, lead hook, rear hook, lead uppercut and rear uppercut, being the most used. The lead overhand and rear overhand are the remaining basic punches. Any punch other than a jab is considered a power punch. If a boxer is right-handed (orthodox), their left hand is the lead hand and his right hand is the rear hand. For a left-handed boxer or southpaw, the hand positions are reversed. When using these punches in combinations they are often referred to as numbers, with the jab being the number 1, cross being 2, lead hook 3, rear hook 4, lead uppercut 5 and rear uppercut 6. For example, a jab and cross combination would be referred to as a 1-2 combination.

For clarity, the following assumes a right-handed boxer.

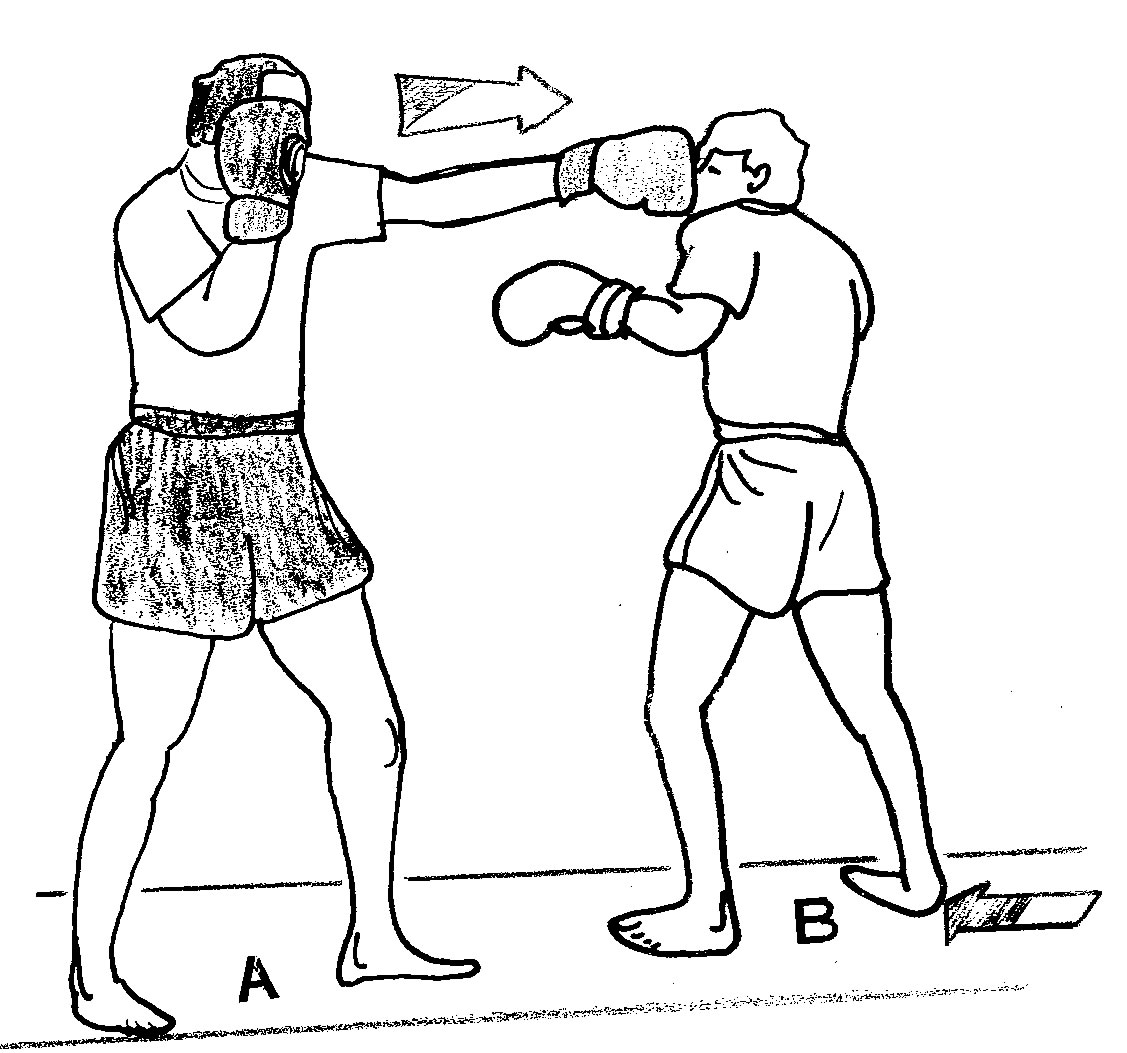
Jab

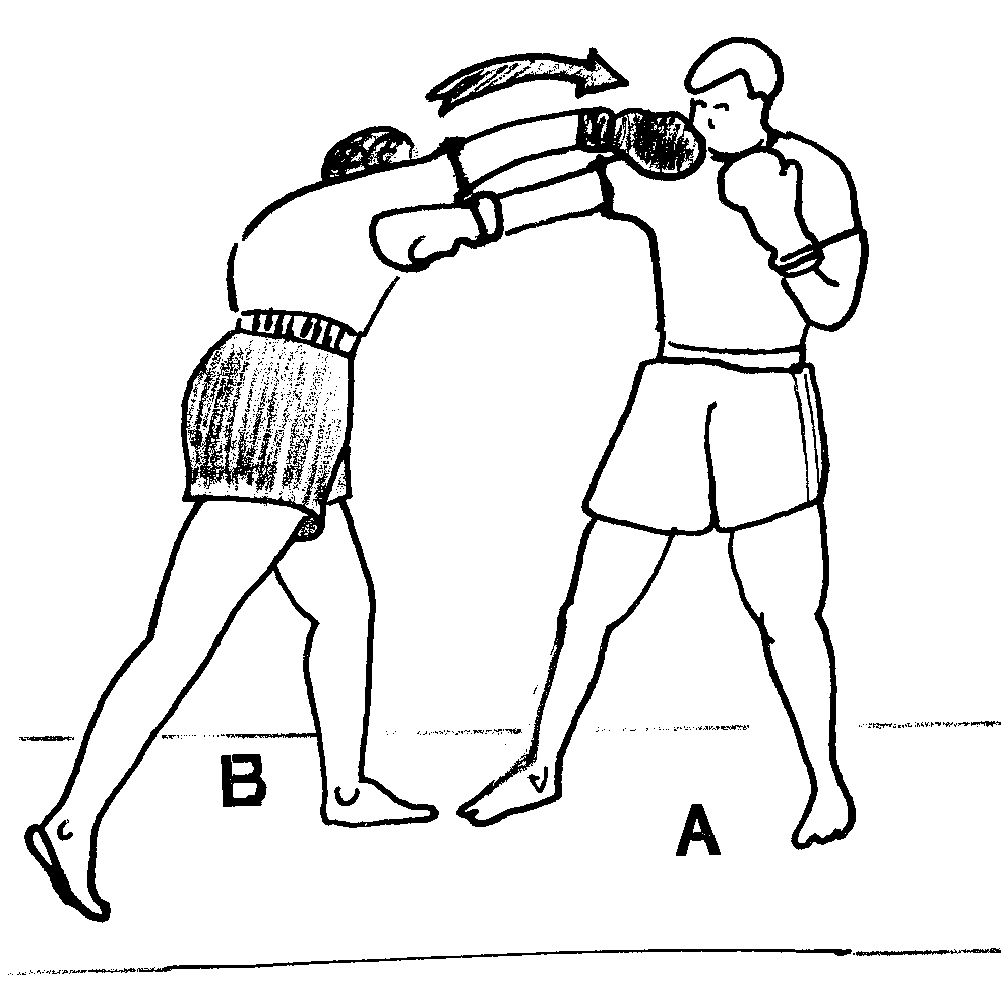
Cross – in counter-punch with a looping

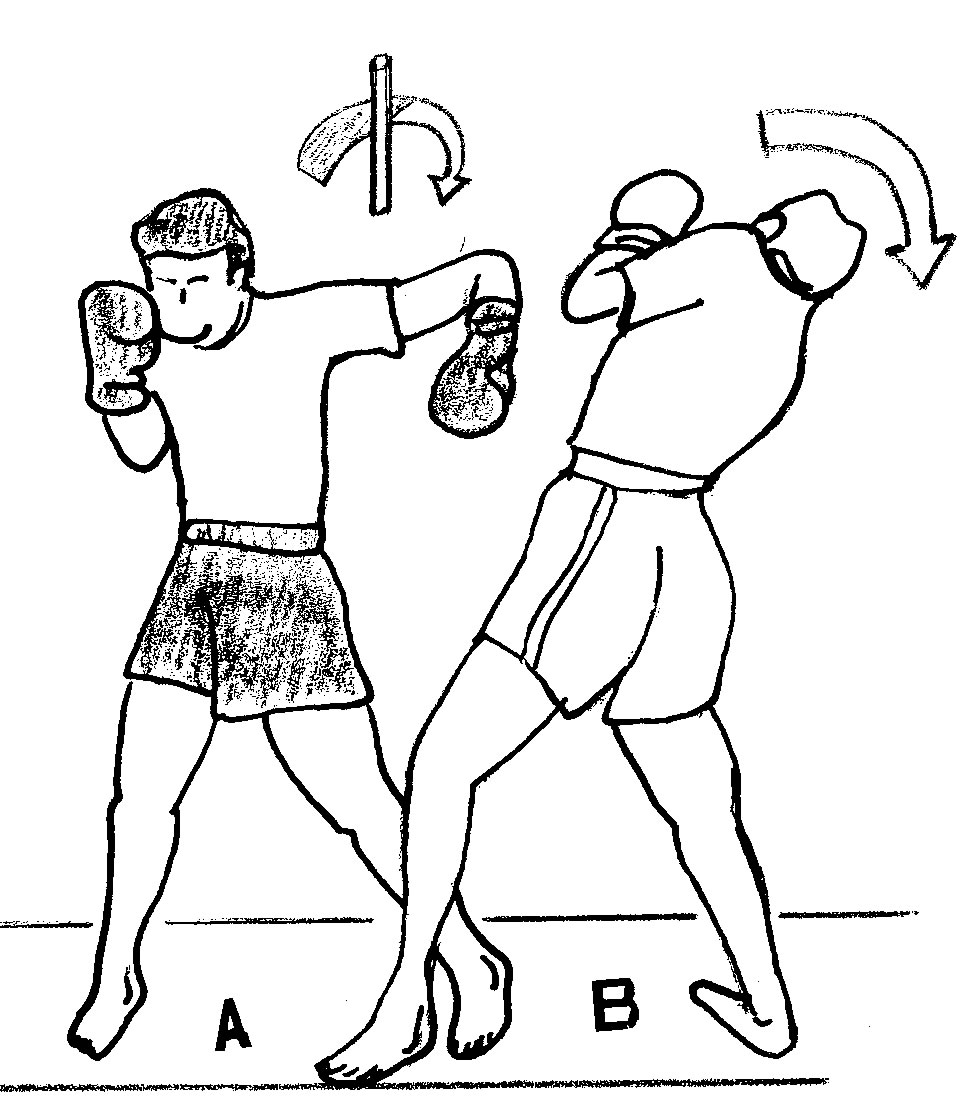
Hook

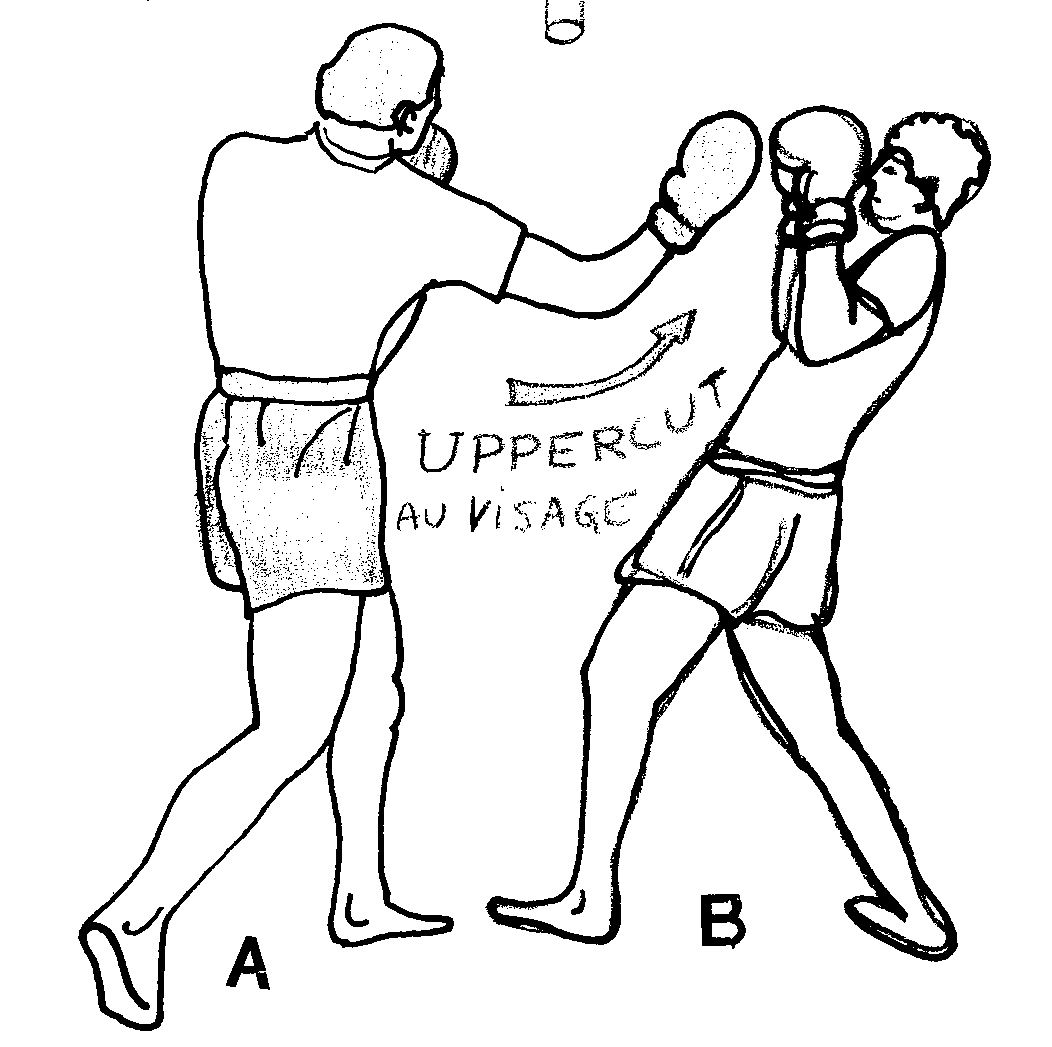
Uppercut

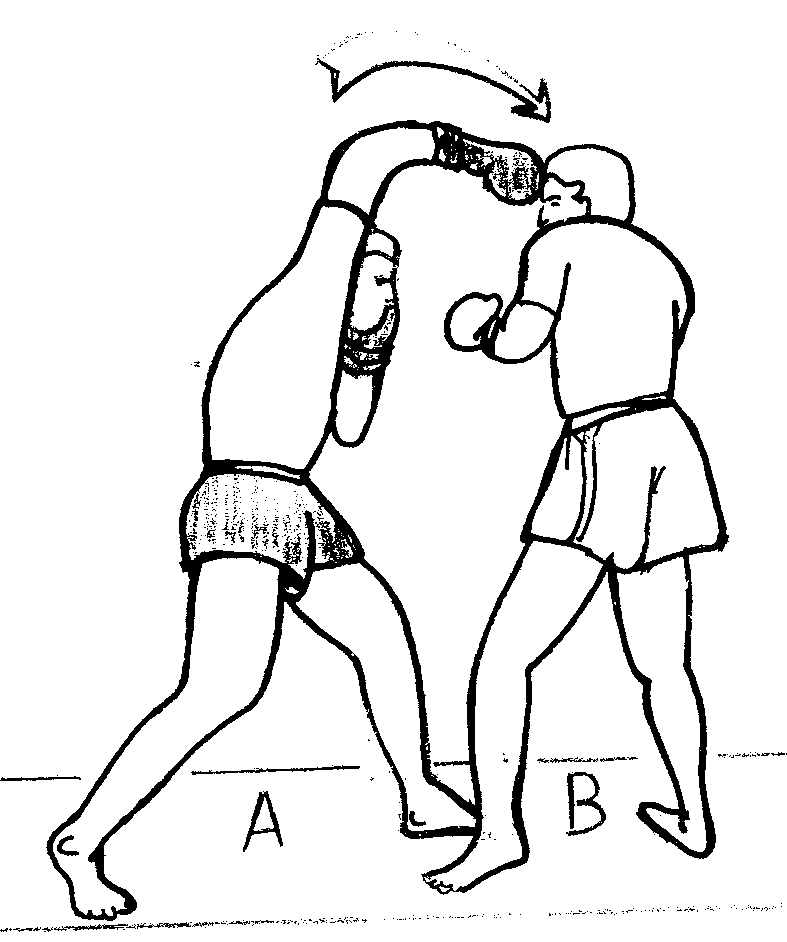
Overhand (overcut)

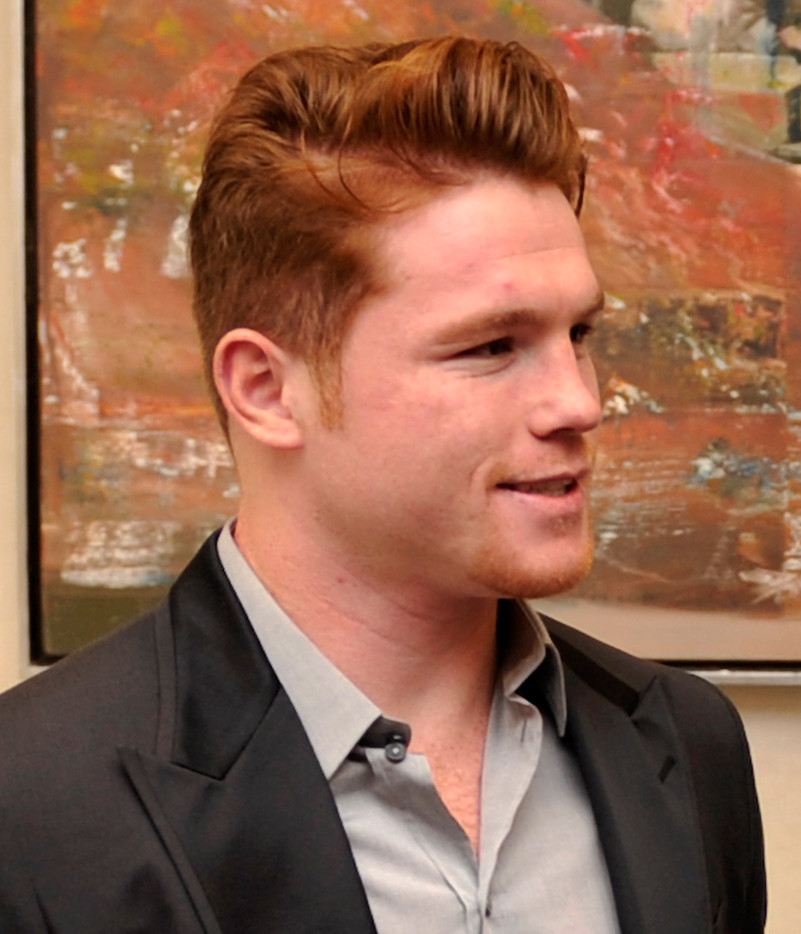
Canelo Álvarez is known as an excellent counterpuncher and being able to exploit openings in his opponents' guards while avoiding punches with head and body movement. He is also known as a formidable body puncher.

- Jab—a quick, straight punch thrown with the lead hand from the guard position. The jab extends from the side of the torso and typically does not pass in front of it. It is accompanied by a small, clockwise rotation of the torso and hips, while the fist rotates 90 degrees, becoming horizontal upon impact. As the punch reaches full extension, the lead shoulder is brought up to guard the chin. The rear hand remains next to the face to guard the jaw. After making contact with the target, the lead hand is retracted quickly to resume a guard position in front of the face. The jab is the most important punch in a boxer's arsenal because it provides a fair amount of its own cover and it leaves the least amount of space for a counter-punch from the opponent. It has the longest reach of any punch and does not require commitment or large weight transfers. Due to its relatively weak power, the jab is often used as a tool to gauge distances, probe an opponent's defenses, and set up heavier, more powerful punches. The power for the jab originates not from the arm, but from the legs. The punch begins by pushing off the ball of the rear foot, transferring body weight forward into the strike. A half-step may be added, moving the entire body into the punch, for additional power. Despite its lack of power, the jab is the most important punch in boxing, usable not only for attack but also defense, as a good quick, stiff jab can interrupt a much more powerful punch, such as a hook or uppercut. Some notable boxers who have been able to develop relative power in their jabs and use it to punish or wear down their opponents to some effect include Larry Holmes and Wladimir Klitschko.

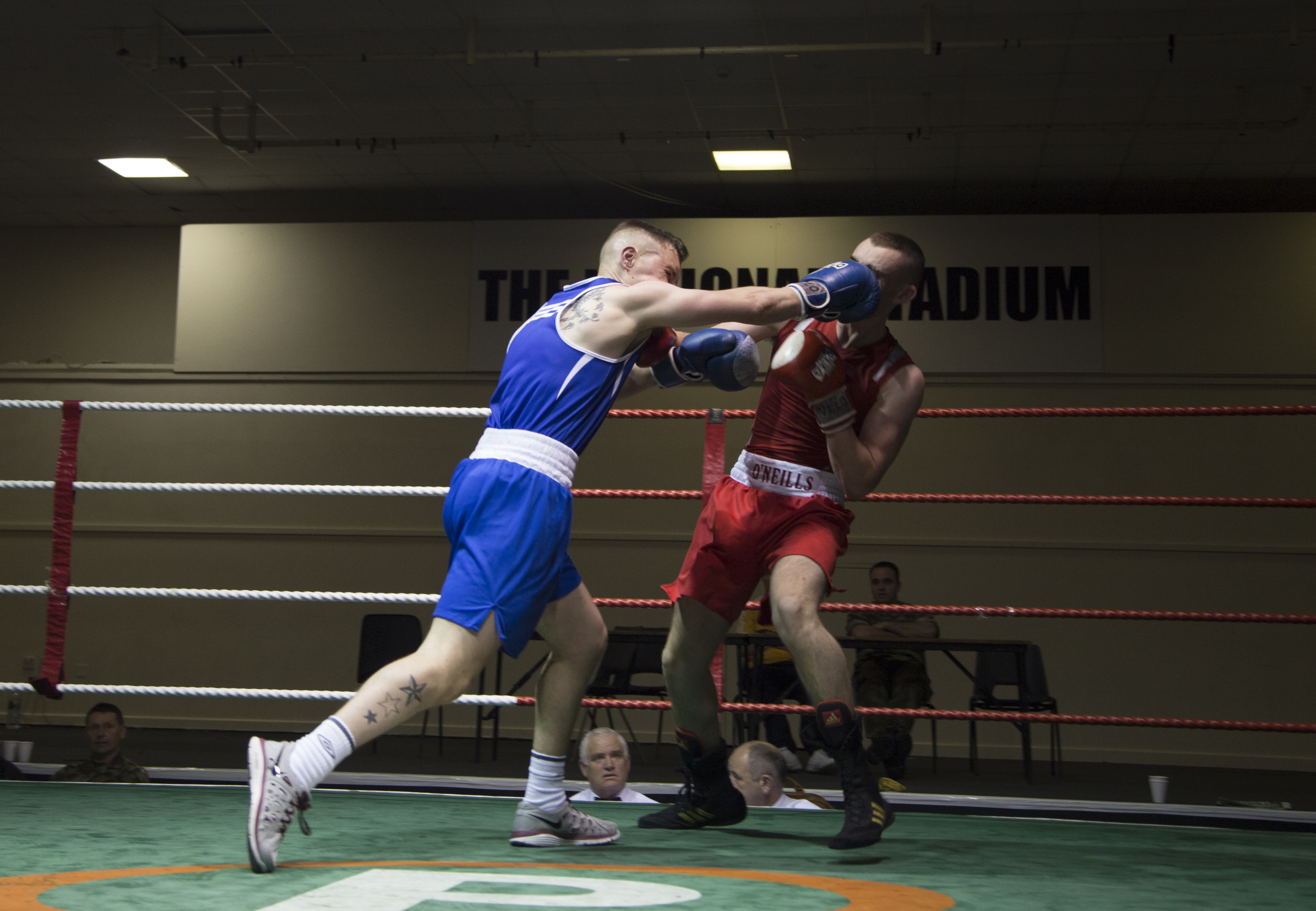
Boxer (left) using a Cross

- Straight / Cross—a powerful straight punch thrown with the rear hand. From the guard position, the rear hand is thrown from the chin, crossing the body and traveling towards the target in a straight line. The rear shoulder is thrust forward and finishes just touching the outside of the chin. At the same time, the lead hand is retracted and tucked against the face to protect the inside of the chin. The power for the cross is generated from the ground up, originating from a strong push off the ball of the rear foot. For additional power, the torso and hips are rotated counter-clockwise as the cross is thrown. A measure of an ideally extended cross is that the shoulder of the striking arm, the knee of the front leg and the ball of the front foot are on the same vertical plane. Weight is also transferred from the rear foot to the lead foot, resulting in the rear heel turning outwards as it acts as a fulcrum for the transfer of weight. Like the jab, a half-step forward may be added. After the straight is thrown, the hand is retracted quickly and the guard position resumed. The straight sets up the lead hook well. The Cross can also follow a jab, creating the classic "one-two combo." When the same punch is used to counter a jab, aiming for the opponent's head it is called a "cross" or "cross-counter". A cross-counter is a counterpunch begun immediately after an opponent throws a jab, exploiting the opening in the opponent's position.
- Hook – A semi-circular punch thrown with the lead hand to the side of the opponent's head. From the guard position, the elbow is drawn back with a horizontal fist (palm facing down) though in modern times a wide percentage of fighters throw the hook with a vertical fist (palm facing themselves). The rear hand is tucked firmly against the jaw to protect the chin. The torso and hips are rotated clockwise, propelling the fist through a tight, clockwise arc across the front of the body and connecting with the target.
  - At the same time, the lead foot pivots clockwise, turning the left heel outwards. Upon contact, the hook's circular path ends abruptly and the lead hand is pulled quickly back into the guard position. A hook may also target the lower body and this technique is sometimes called the "rip" to distinguish it from the conventional hook to the head. The hook may also be thrown with the rear hand. Notable left hookers include Joe Frazier, Roy Jones Jr. and Mike Tyson.

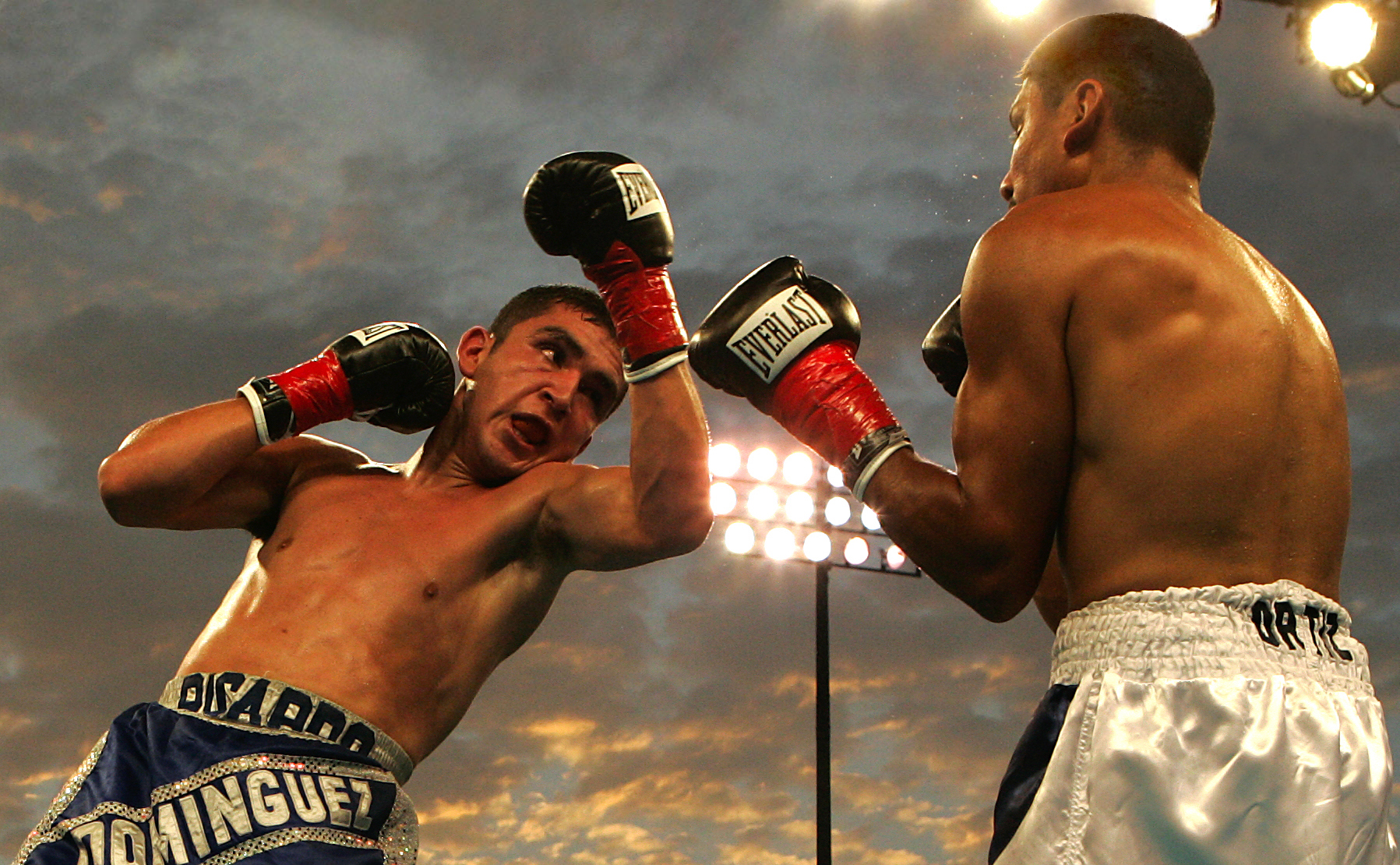
Ricardo Dominguez (left) throws an uppercut on Rafael Ortiz (right)

- Uppercut – A vertical, rising punch thrown with the rear hand. From the guard position, the torso shifts slightly to the right, the rear hand drops below the level of the opponent's chest and the knees are bent slightly. From this position, the rear hand is thrust upwards in a rising arc towards the opponent's chin or torso.
  - At the same time, the knees push upwards quickly and the torso and hips rotate anti-clockwise and the rear heel turns outward, mimicking the body movement of the cross. The strategic utility of the uppercut depends on its ability to "lift" an opponent's body, setting it off-balance for successive attacks. The right uppercut followed by a left hook is a deadly combination employing the uppercut to lift an opponent's chin into a vulnerable position, then the hook to knock the opponent out. Both the hook and uppercut may be thrown with both hands, resulting in differing footwork and positioning from that described above if thrown by the other hand. Generally the analogous opposite is true of the footwork and torso movement.
- Overhand—The overhand punch, also known as a drop or overcut, is a powerful, semi-circular strike thrown in a vertical, arcing motion designed to go over an opponent's guard or strike, like a jab, to hit their head.
  - Executed by driving off the back leg and dropping the body weight into the punch, its mechanics involve a coordinated step and weight transfer similar to throwing a baseball to generate significant power. Depending on the fighter's stance, the footwork varies to either maintain a wide base for a quick retreat or to step in for more power and balance, though the punch often leaves the thrower exposed, requiring a defensive roll to avoid counters.

These different punch types can be thrown in rapid succession to form combinations or "combos". The most common is the jab and cross combination, nicknamed the "one-two combo". This is usually an effective combination, because the jab blocks the opponent's view of the cross, making it easier to land cleanly and forcefully.

A large, swinging circular punch starting from a cocked-back position with the arm at a longer extension than the hook and all of the fighter's weight behind it is sometimes referred to as a "roundhouse", "haymaker", or sucker-punch. A haymaker is a wide-angle punch similar to a hook, but instead of getting power from body rotation, it gets its power from its large loop. It is considered an unsophisticated punch, and leaves one open to a counter. Relying on body weight and centripetal force within a wide arc, the roundhouse can be a powerful blow, but it is often a wild and uncontrolled punch that leaves the fighter delivering it off balance and with an open guard.

Wide, looping punches have the further disadvantage of taking more time to deliver, giving the opponent ample warning to react and counter. For this reason, the haymaker or roundhouse is not a conventional punch, and is regarded by trainers as a mark of poor technique or desperation. Sometimes it has been used, because of its immense potential power, to finish off an already staggering opponent who seems unable or unlikely to take advantage of the poor position it leaves the puncher in.

Another unconventional punch is the rarely used bolo punch, in which the opponent swings an arm out several times in a wide arc, usually as a distraction, before delivering with either that or the other arm.

An illegal punch to the back of the head or neck is known as a rabbit punch.

=== Defense ===
Defense in boxing refers to actions taken by a boxer to avoid being hit, redirect an opponents attack or reduce the impact of punches to vital areas such as the head. Defensive techniques generally fall into 4 categories of evading, blocking, covering and clinching.

=== Evading ===
Evading refers to actions a boxer takes to try to avoid strikes entirely by making their opponents miss.

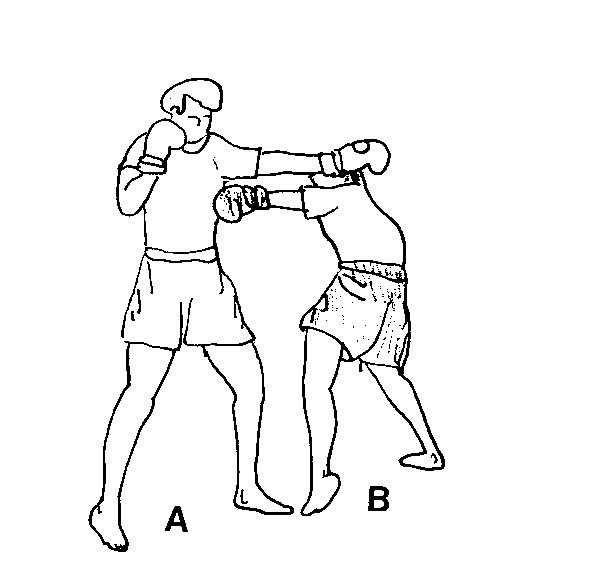
Slipping

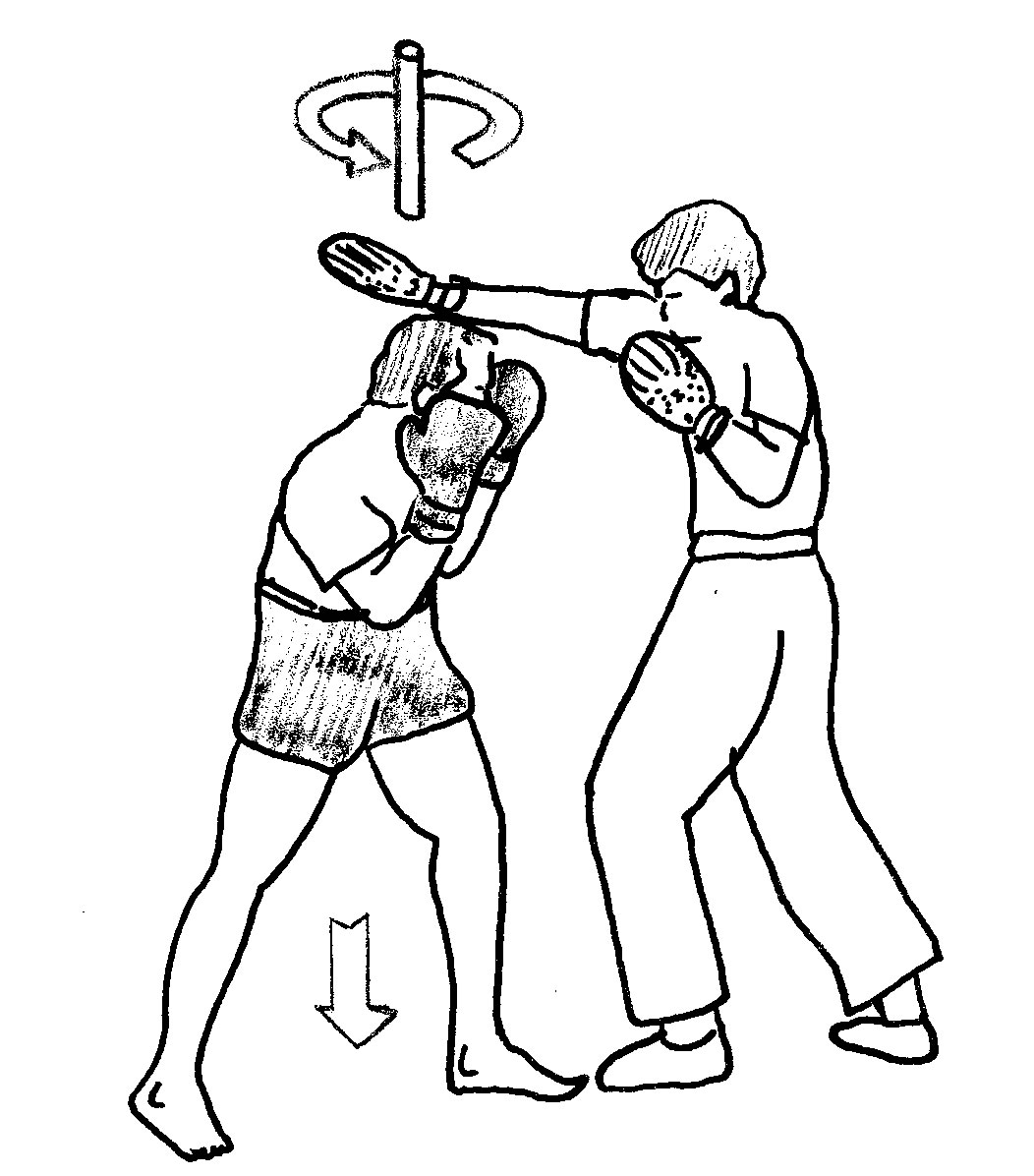
Bobbing

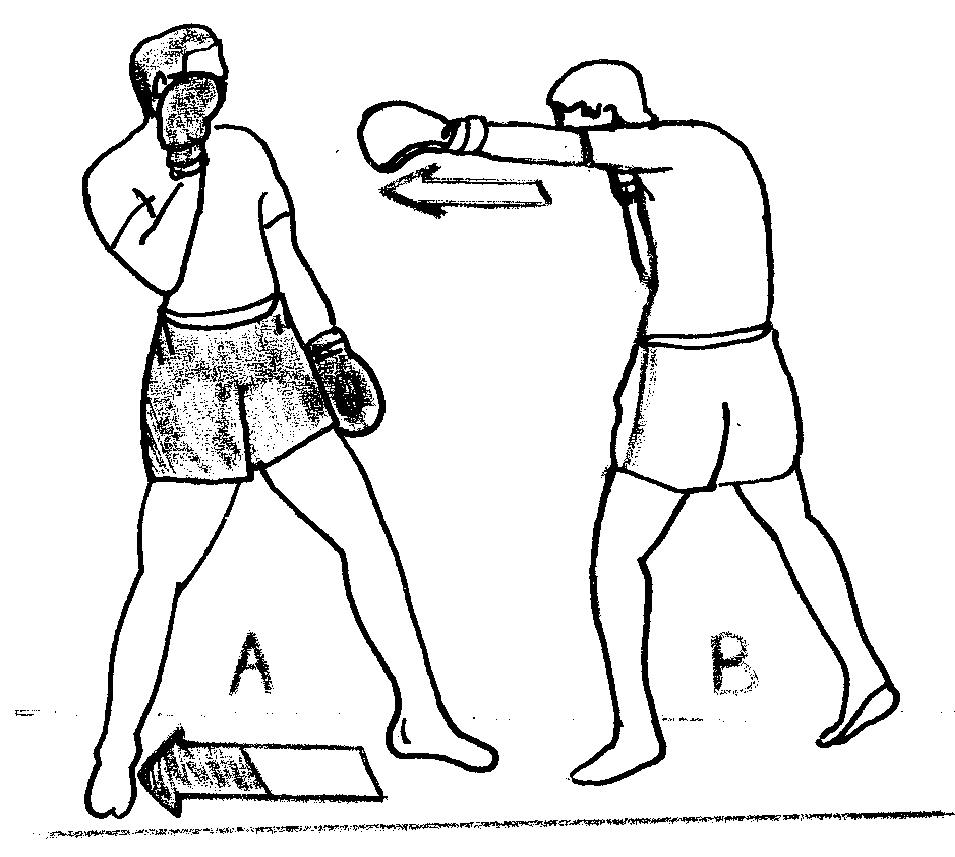
Footwork

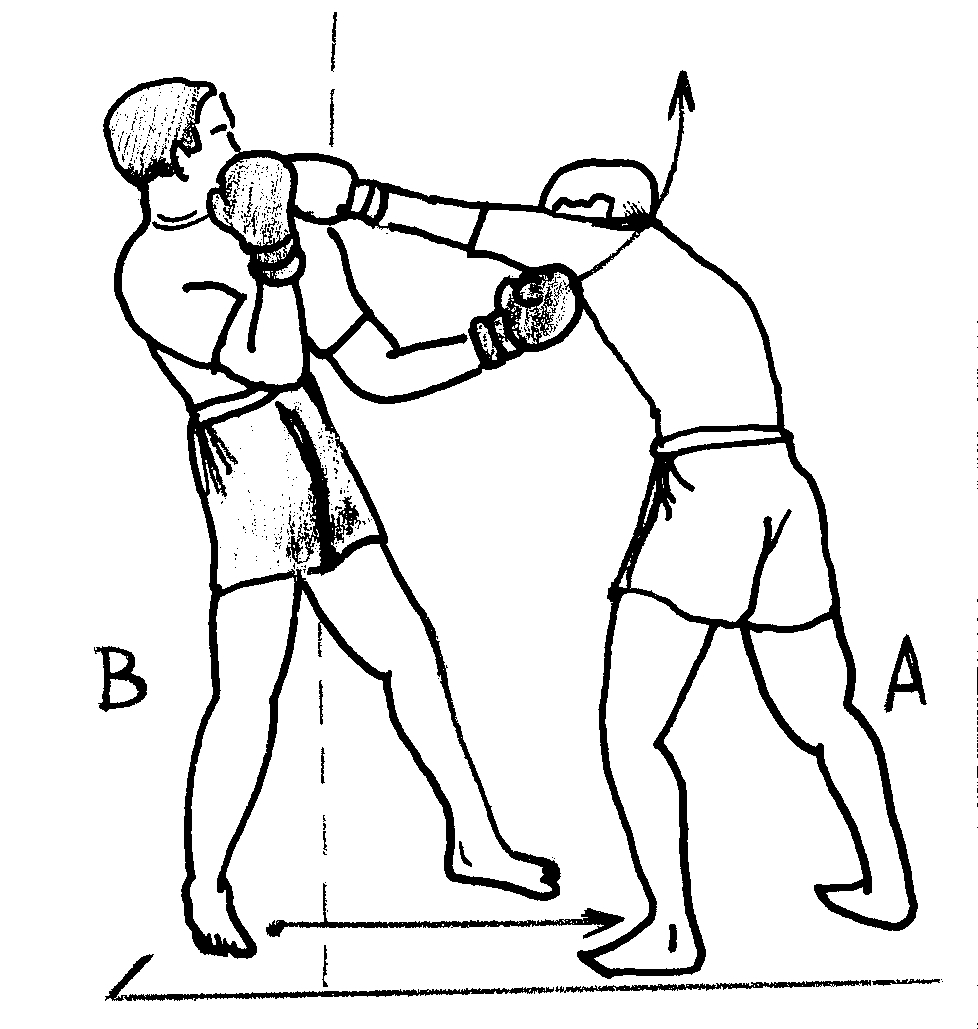
Pulling away

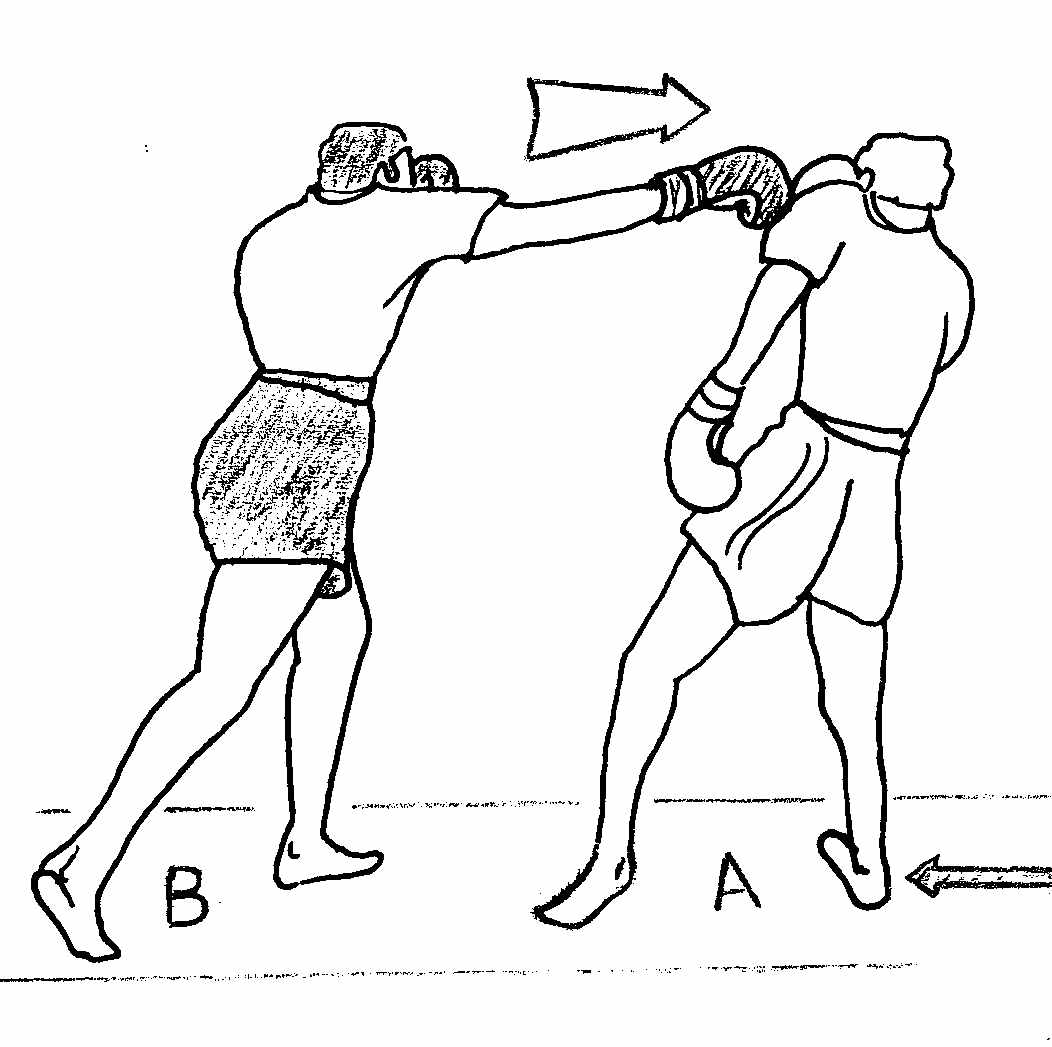
Shoulder roll
- Slipping—involves moving the head slightly offline of an incoming punch, often by leaning and twisting the upper body.
- Bob-and-weave—bobbing moves the head laterally and beneath an incoming punch. As the opponent's punch arrives, the boxer bends the legs quickly and simultaneously shifts the body either slightly right or left. Once the punch has been evaded, the boxer "weaves" back to an upright position, emerging on either the outside or inside of the opponent's still-extended arm. To move outside the opponent's extended arm is called "bobbing to the outside". To move inside the opponent's extended arm is called "bobbing to the inside".
- Footwork—involves moving the feet to create angles, create distance, or get out of the way of punches, including linear and circular movements.
- Pulling—Moving the body backward to create distance and avoid punches.
- Leaning back—moving the upper body backward to evade punches, often combined with shifting weight onto the back leg.
- Sway / fade—To anticipate a punch and move the upper body or head back so that it misses or has its force appreciably lessened. Also called "rolling with the punch" or "riding the punch".
- Shoulder roll – To execute the shoulder roll a fighter rotates and ducks (to the right for orthodox fighters and to the left for southpaws) when their opponents punch is coming towards them and then rotates back towards their opponent while their opponent is bringing their hand back. The fighter will throw a punch with their back hand as they are rotating towards their undefended opponent.

=== Blocking ===
Blocking refers to actions a boxer takes to absorb, redirect, intercept or slow the momentum of an opponents strikes preventing blows from impacting vital areas such as the head and midsection.

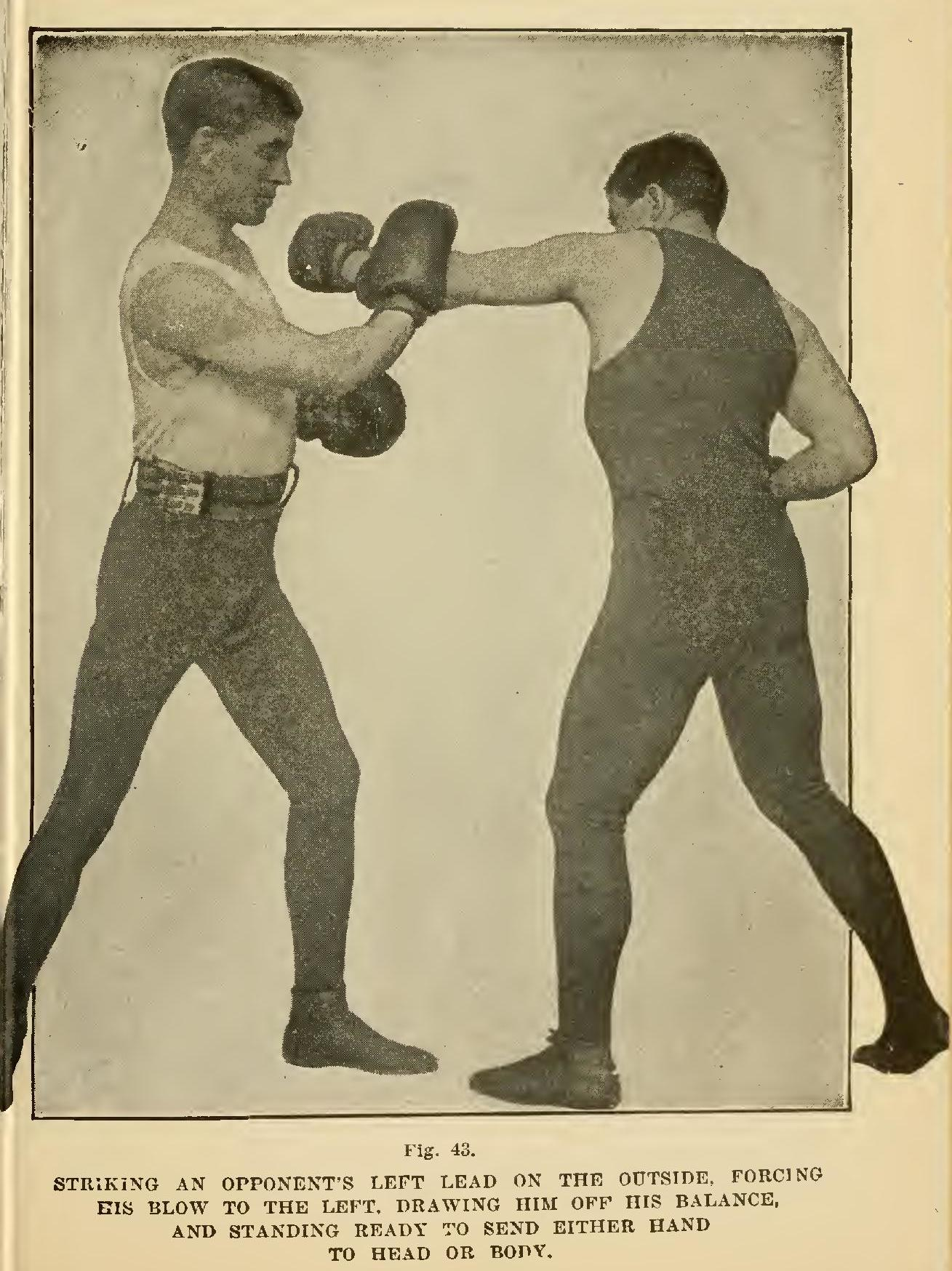
Boxer (left) parrying opponent's jab from closed stance.

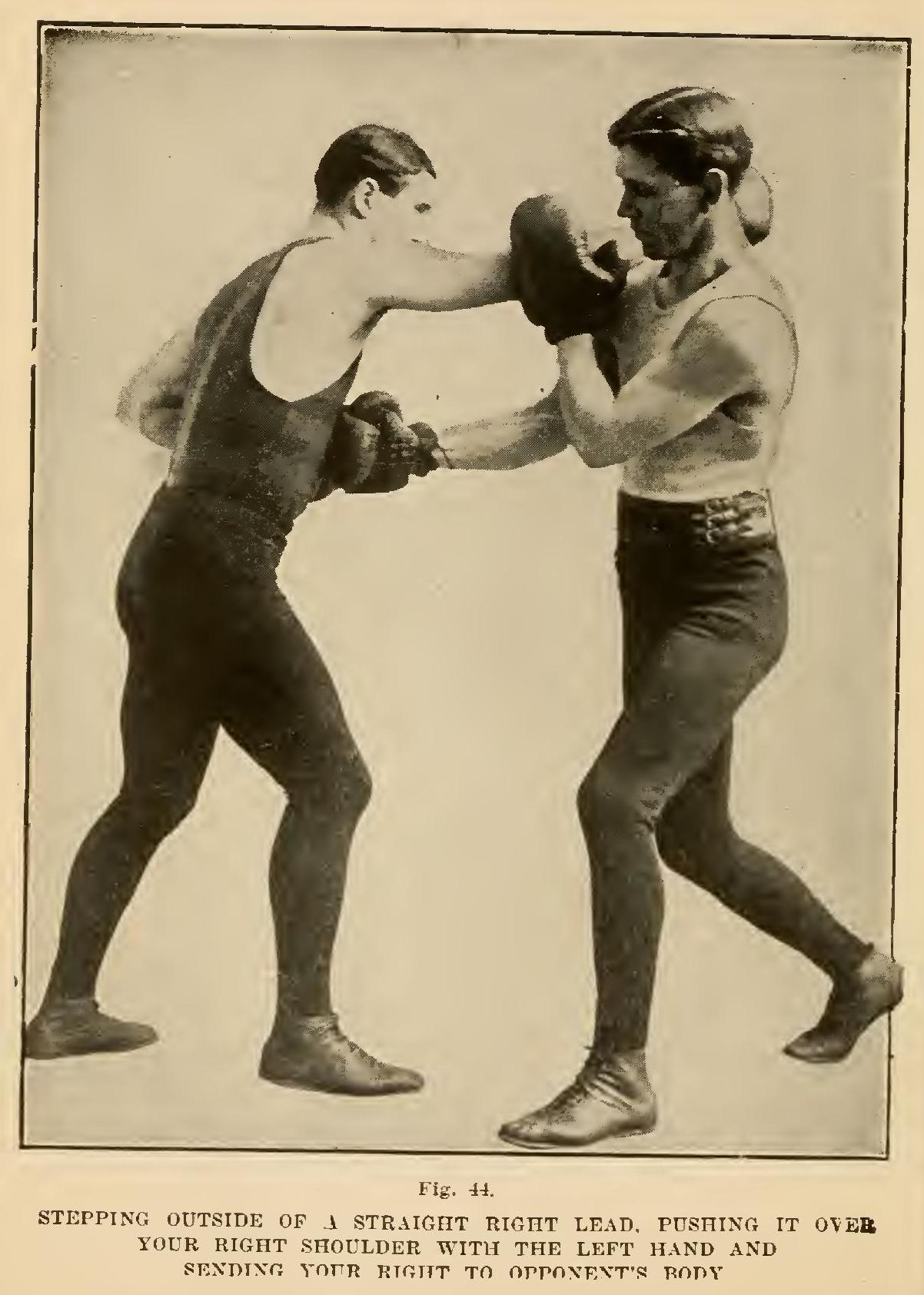
Boxer (right) parrying opponent's jab from open stance.

- Parry—parrying uses the boxer's hands as defensive tools to deflect incoming attacks. As the opponent's punch arrives, the boxer delivers a sharp, lateral, open-handed blow to the opponent's wrist or forearm, redirecting the punch.

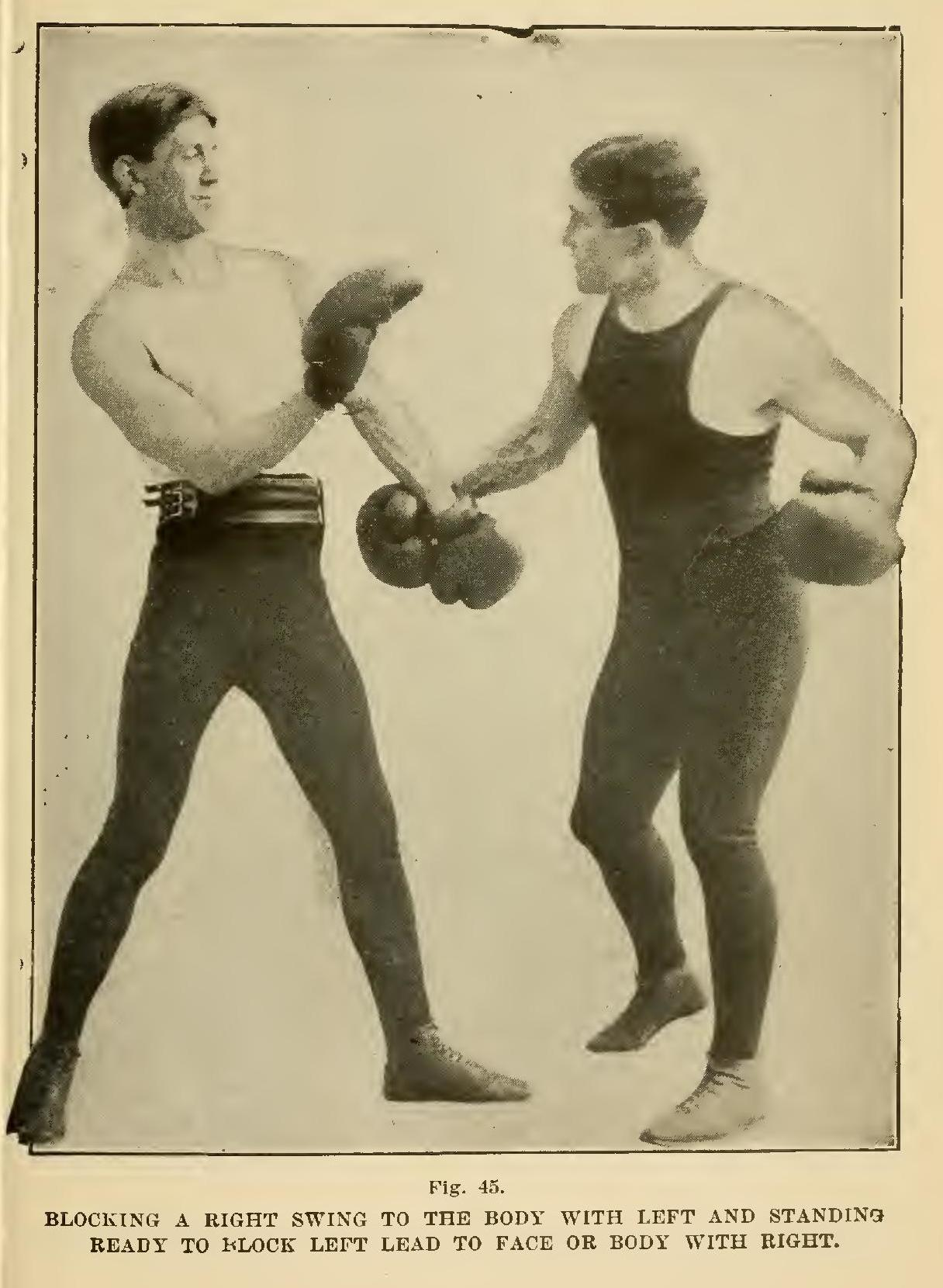
Boxer (left) using a low parry.

- Low parry—is a defensive technique used to deflect punches aimed at the body, particularly low punches. It involves moving the arm in a half-circle motion, typically starting from the outside and moving inwards, to clear the punch to the side. This technique is effective because it avoids absorbing the impact from the punch directly, which can be more forceful and put you off balance, instead, it guides the punch away from the intended target.

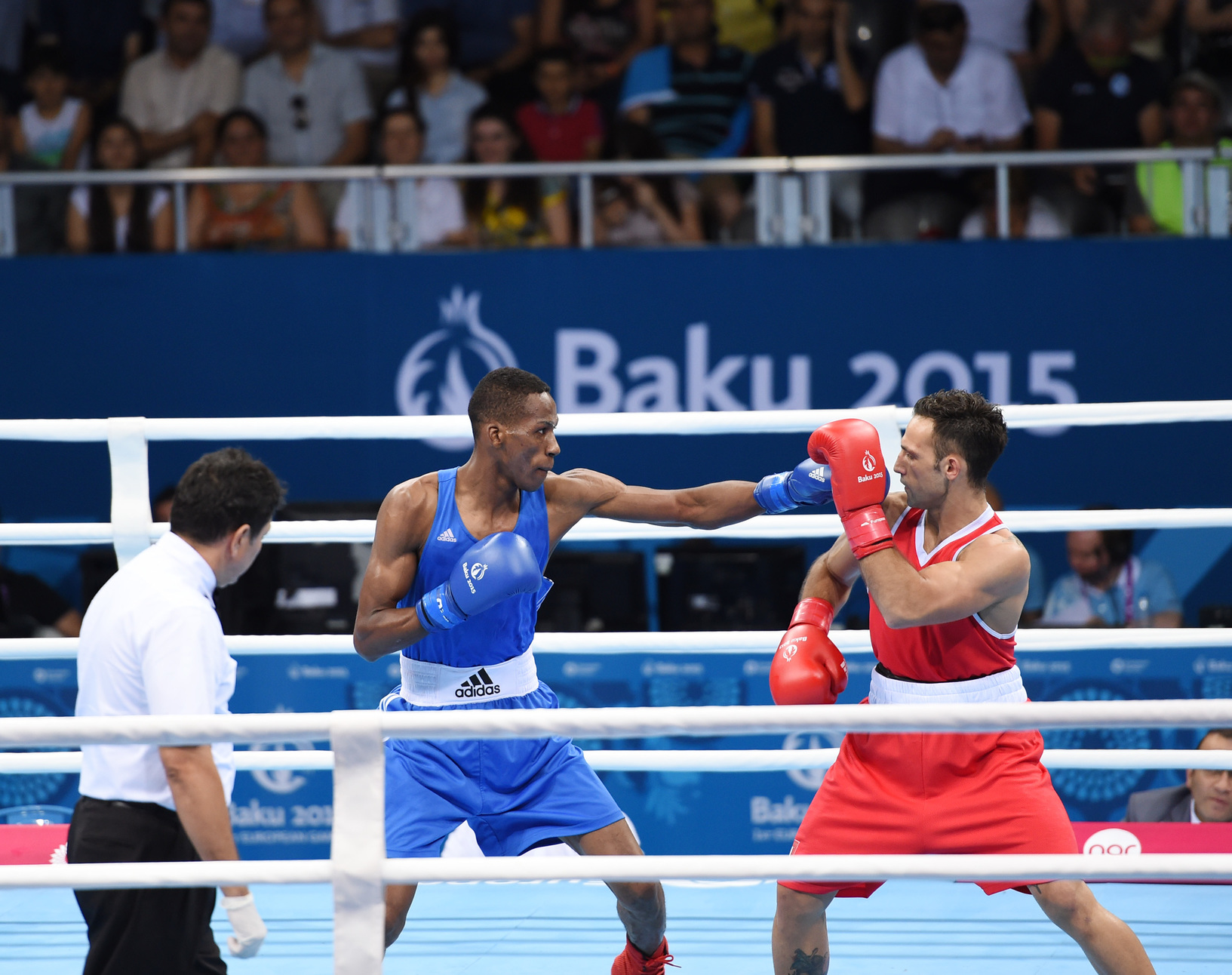
Boxer (right) using a punch catch

- Punch catch—is a defensive technique where a fighter uses their open palm to intercept an incoming punch, aiming to slow the momentum of the strike and stopping it from hitting its intended target. Catching is often used for straight punches like the jab.

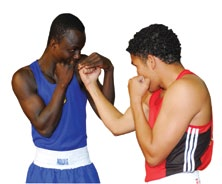
Boxer (right) using uppercut catch from open stance

- Uppercut catch—is a defensive technique where a fighter uses their open palm to intercept an incoming uppercut, aiming to slow the momentum of the strike and stopping it from hitting its intended target. This is generally used against uppercuts to the head. In general when boxers are in a closed stance the boxer uses their rear hand to catch a lead uppercut and their lead hand to catch a rear uppercut. In an open stance the boxer generally uses their lead hand to catch a lead uppercut and their rear hand to catch a rear uppercut.

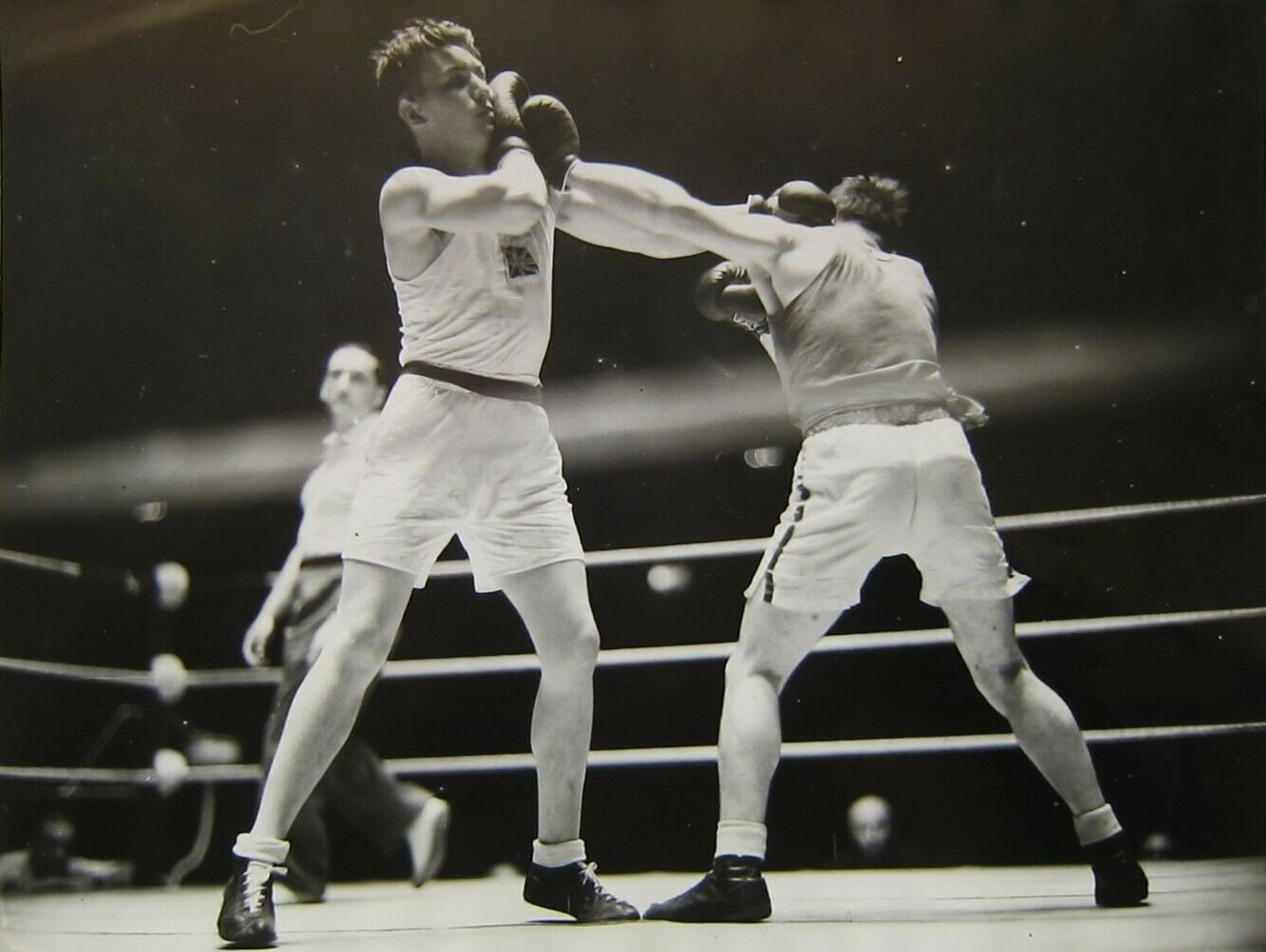
Boxer (left) using cross block

- Cross block—is often done with the rear arm (right for an orthodox fighter and left for a southpaw) but can also be done with the lead arm (left for an orthodox fighter and right for a southpaw). In a cross block position with the rear hand, the glove is over the lead shoulder with the palm facing towards the opponent. Using the lead hand the glove is over the rear shoulder with the palm facing towards the opponent. With the cross block the glove is usually used to block straight punches, but the forearm can also be used. The forearm and elbow can be used to block uppercuts, and the glove and elbow can also be used to block hooks.

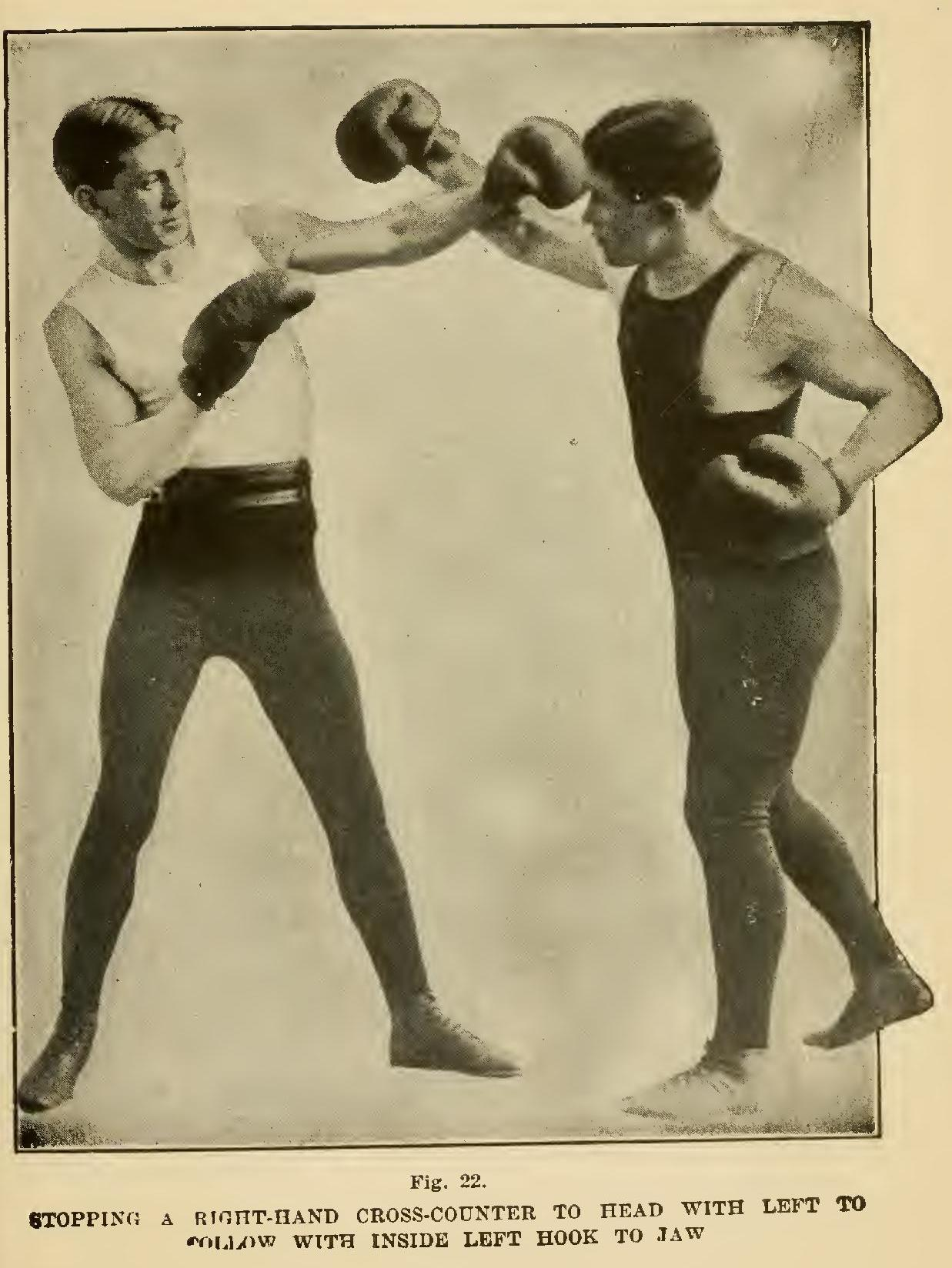
Boxer (left) using a wedge block

- Wedge block—also known as the horizontal forearm block or leverage block. This block is used primarily with the lead arm to defend against straight punches by moving the arm upwards towards the incoming punch. It can be used against hooks by moving the arm up and outwards towards the incoming hook, or outwards to jam uppercuts in boxing.
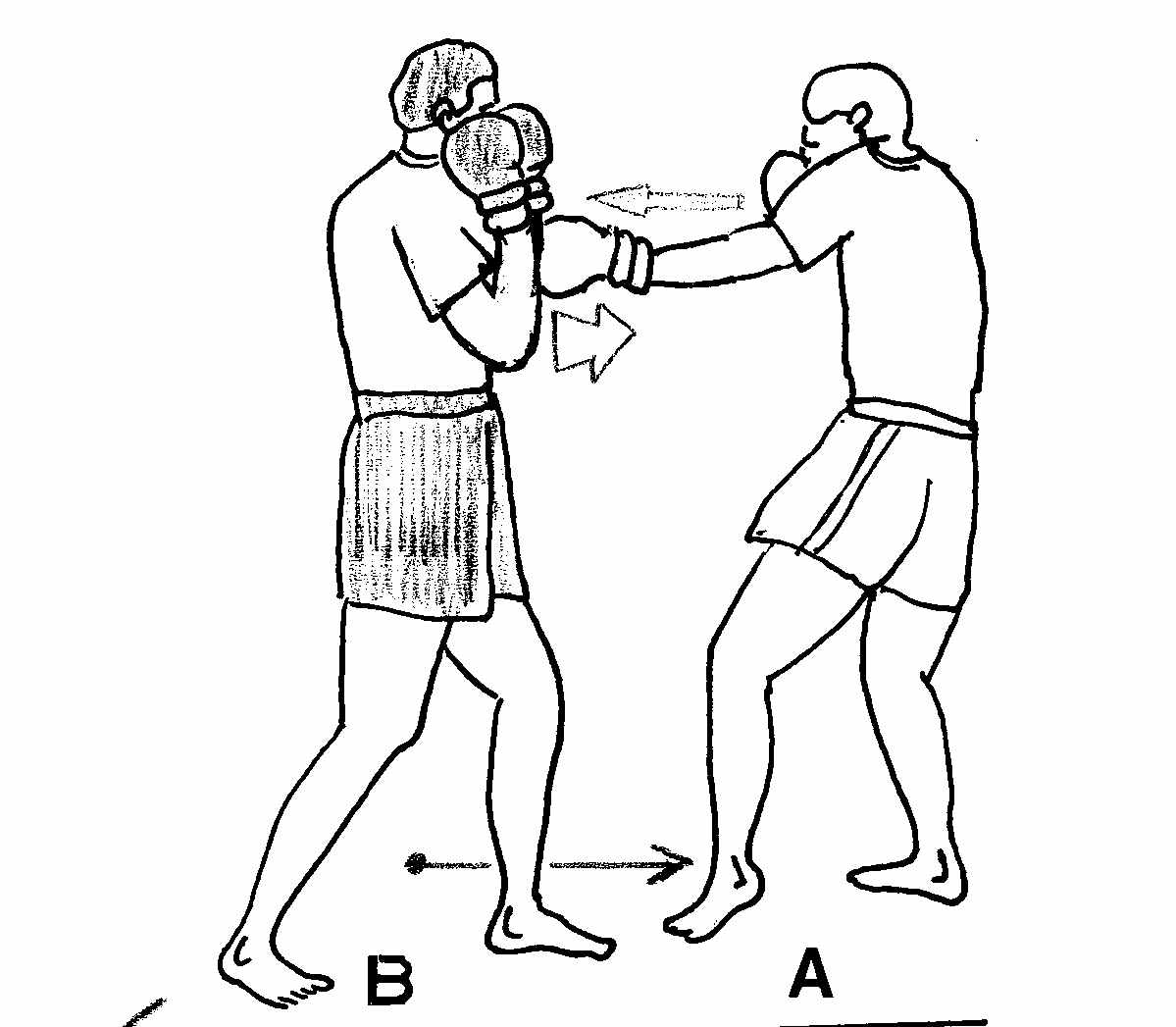
Blocking (straight punch to the body with the forearms)

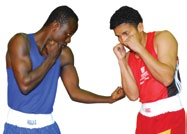
Fighter (right) using forearm block against uppercut to the body

- Forearm body blocks—Boxers, especially classic guard fighters, will often turn their body towards straight strikes and uppercuts to the midsection using their forearms to block.
- Elbow body blocks—Boxers often use their elbows to block hooks to the liver and kidneys by moving their elbows or leaning their bodies so the elbow connects with their opponent's fists.

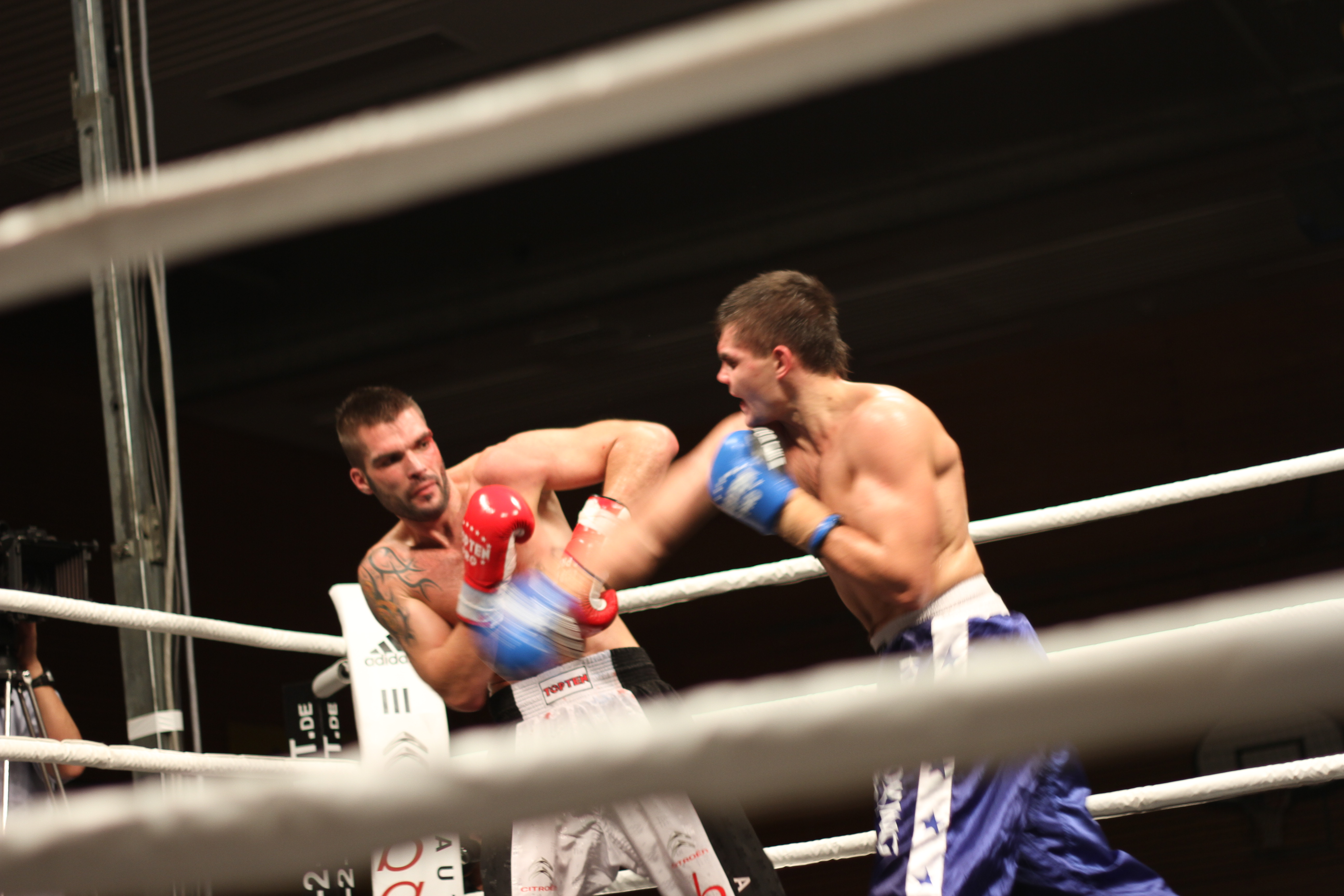
Fighter (left) using reverse elbow block

- Reverse elbow block—Crab Style fighters are unique as the low lead allows them to use the reverse elbows to block their heads. The reverse elbow block can be used from a shoulder roll position. The reverse elbow block also functions as an intermediating position between a wedge block and a shoulder roll, allowing a boxer to move from a reverse elbow block to a wedge block or shoulder roll.
- Shoulder block—a defensive technique where a fighter uses their shoulder to deflect or block punches, particularly the opponent's lead hand punch like a right cross or a southpaw jab. The fighter positions their lead shoulder high, tucking their chin behind it. The shoulder is rolled forward to meet the incoming punch, deflecting it away from the head and body.

"If, however, his right lead is thrown at you when you are out of normal position-when, for example, you have permitted your left hand to drop down in an overzealous feint to the body-you must block with your left shoulder. You give your left shoulder a frantic, whirling hunch to protect your already snuggled chin. Thus, the blow thuds into your shoulder instead of into your face (Figure 53). You'll be tempted to use your right hand to help your left shoulder in that block. You'll be tempted to make a "shell defense" with shoulder and hand. But don't do it. You've got to keep that right hand in its normal position, ready to (1) guard against the possibility of a following left hook, and (2) smash a straight right counter to your opponent's solar plexus or chin." - Jack Dempsey's Championship Boxing Explosive Punching and Aggressive Defense.

=== Covering ===
Covering refers to action a boxer takes to reduce the impact of strikes to vital areas such as the head and midsection. Unlike blocking, covering puts the gloves on the boxer's head or body directly. Some damage is still done to the boxer while covering, but the goal is to reduce the damage by using the gloves or arms as shock absorbers lessening the severity of blows.

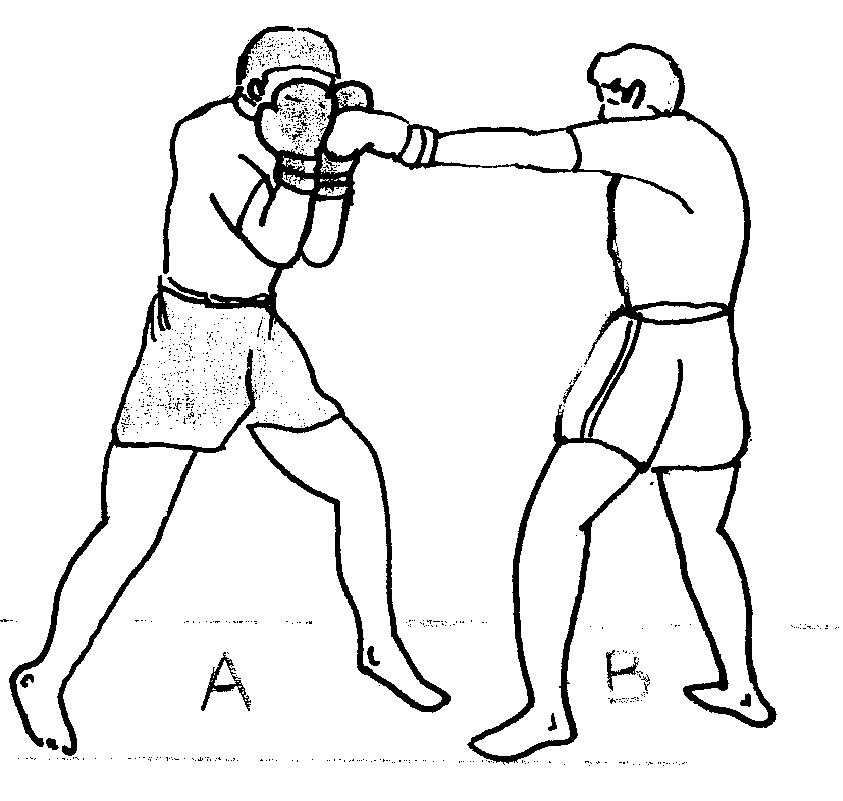
Covering (with the gloves)
- Covering – covering up is the last opportunity to avoid an incoming strike to an unprotected face or body. Generally speaking, the hands are held high to protect the head and chin and the forearms are tucked against the torso to impede body shots. When protecting the body, the boxer rotates the hips and lets incoming punches "roll" off the guard. To protect the head, the boxer presses both fists against the front of the face with the forearms parallel and facing outwards. This type of guard is weak against attacks from below.

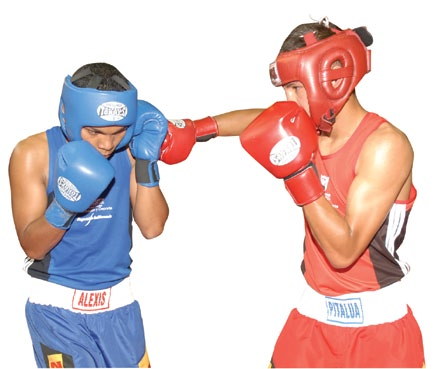
Boxer (left) using hook cover

- Hook cover – a hook cover is a defense against a hook where a boxer raises their hand up, bending the elbow as if answering a phone creating a position where the glove covers the head against the hook. The chin is also tucked while covering. The boxer may also slightly lean the upper body away from the incoming hook, coordinating this lean with a small step or shift in their weight to maintain balance and create space for a counter. For crab style fighters with a low lead hand in a closed stance, the fighter must turn their waist towards the incoming hook while using a hook cover to be able to shoulder block, shoulder roll or elbow block a follow-up cross. If the crab style boxer does not turn their waist the hook will pin the boxer's glove to their head making them unable to turn their waist to shoulder block, shoulder roll or reverse elbow block a follow up cross, with the low lead this will leave them open to being hit by the cross.

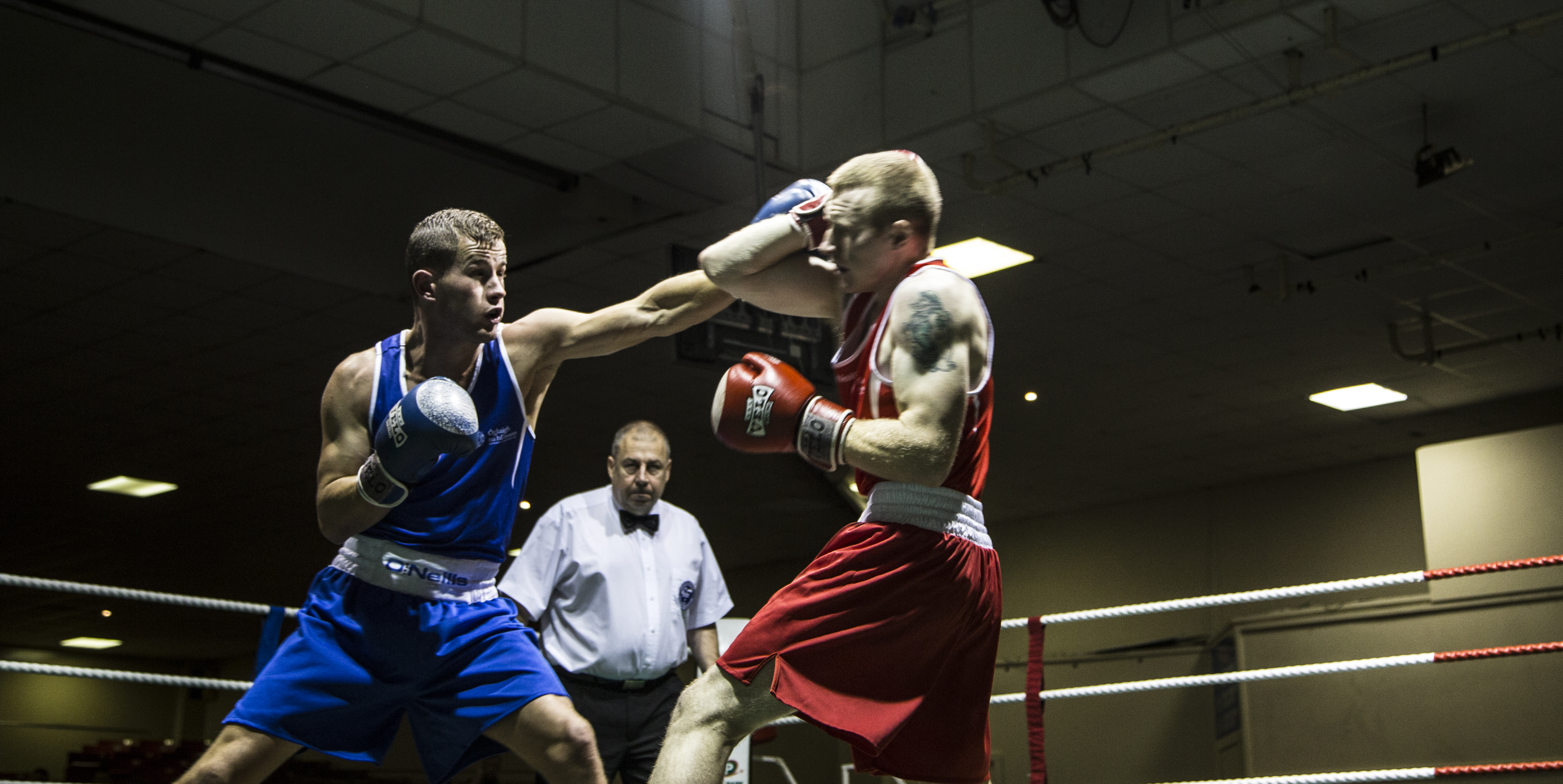
Boxer (right) using a Helmet cover

- Helmet cover – also known as a Hammer cover, is a variation of the Hook cover. It is a defensive technique where a fighter raises their forearm and hand to protect their head, it resembles a person using a hammer. This technique is often used when facing opponents who throw high-impact punches to defend against hooks and overhands.

=== Clinching ===
Clinching refers to grappling techniques a boxer uses to tie up an opponent's arms to prevent them from striking, or lessen the impact of strikes. Clinching techniques can also be used to move an opponent to a position where they are unable to effectively strike from. Clinching also includes framing, pinning, posting and trapping an opponent's hand or arm to prevent them from punching.

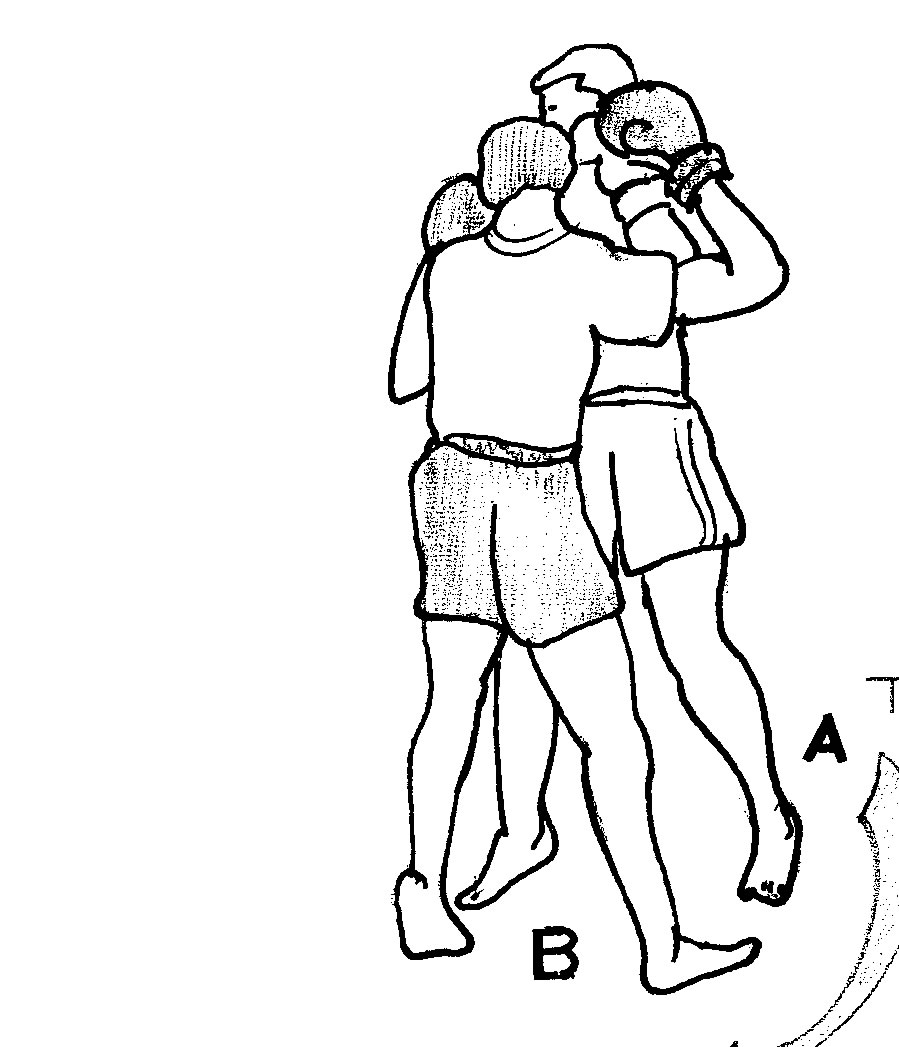
Clinching
- Clinch – clinching is a rough form of grappling and occurs when the distance between both fighters has closed and straight punches cannot be employed. In this situation, the boxer attempts to hold or "tie up" the opponent's hands so he is unable to throw hooks or uppercuts. To perform a clinch, the boxer loops both hands around the outside of the opponent's shoulders, scooping back under the forearms to grasp the opponent's arms tightly against his own body. In this position, the opponent's arms are pinned and cannot be used to attack. Clinching is a temporary match state and is quickly dissipated by the referee.

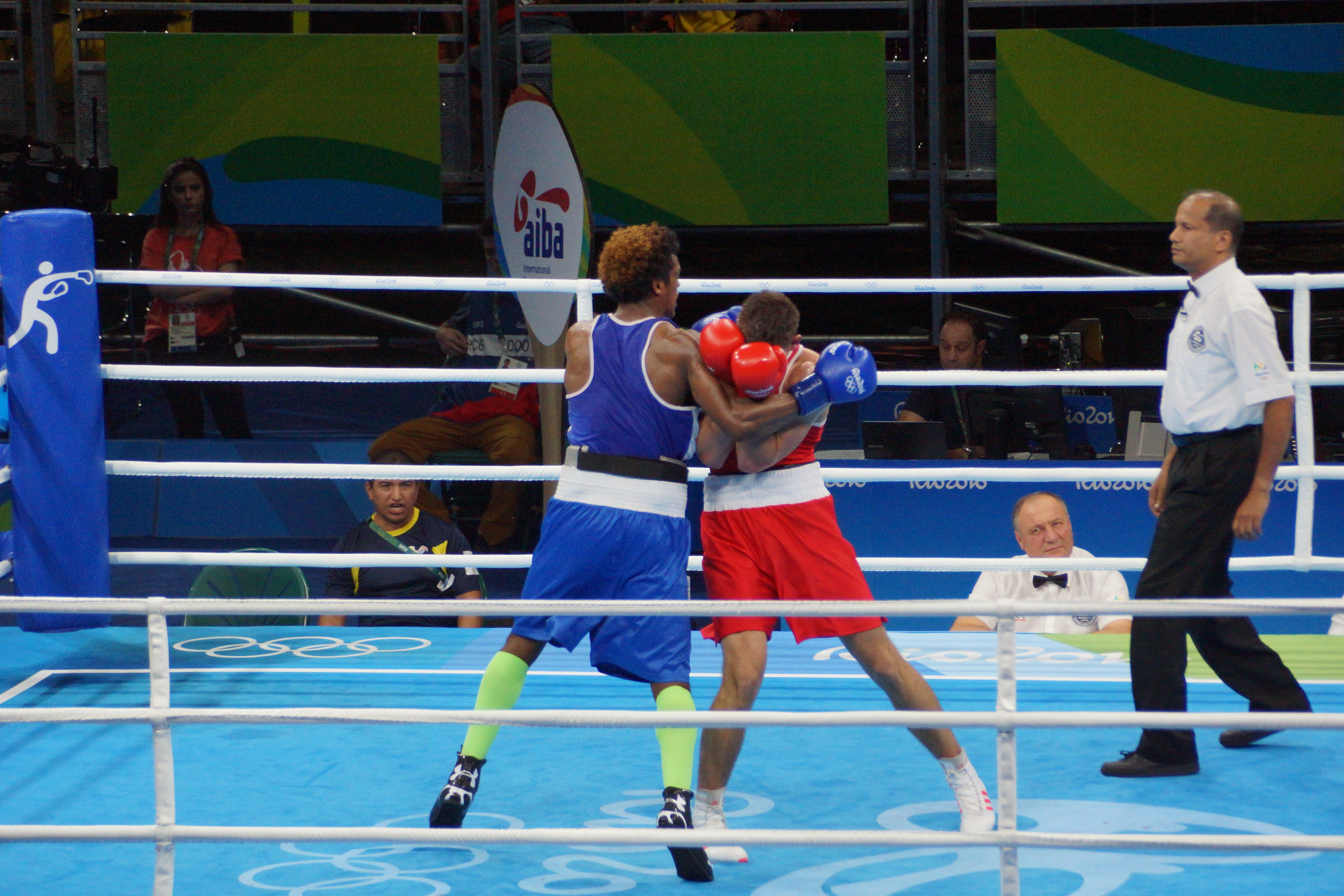
Boxer (left) using Arm-in hug against boxer (right) using High Guard

- Arm-in hug usually occurs when the opponent is in a high guard while changing levels to enter the clinch. The arms are wrapped around the opponent, covering the whole body. This action traps their arms on the inside, preventing them from punching. The arm-in hug is a rather weak position that should not be relied on too much as an opponent can easily break out of it by pushing, or putting a frame with the forearm or elbow.

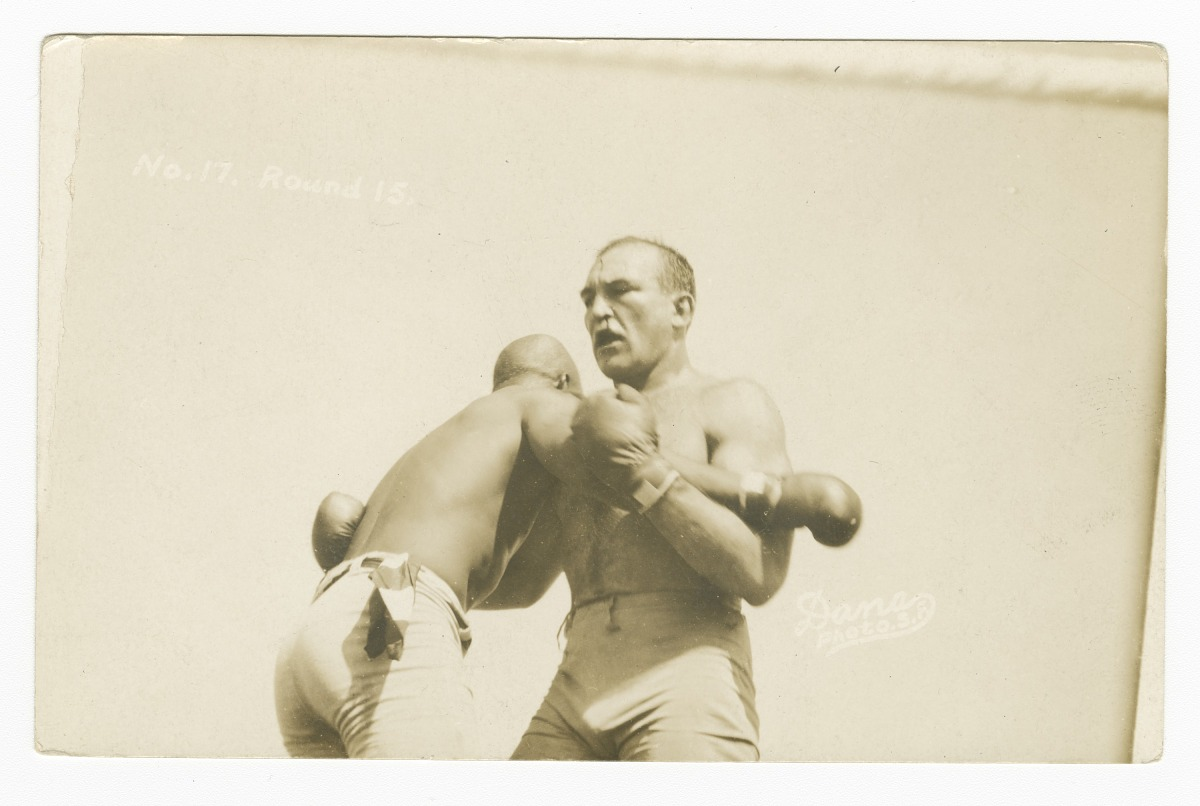
James J. Jeffries (right) using underhooks against Jack Johnson

- Underhook is a position that a boxer may use in a clinch. The boxer's arm is placed under their opponent's arm or armpit. Their hand can be placed on their upper arm, shoulder or back. It is often used in combination with other arm positions such as an overhook which is called an over-under position. When a boxer secures one underhook it is called a single underhook and when using both underhooks it is called double underhooks. An underhook can be used to push the opponent's arm down or lift the opponent up and destabilize them, breaking their balance and getting them off their base.

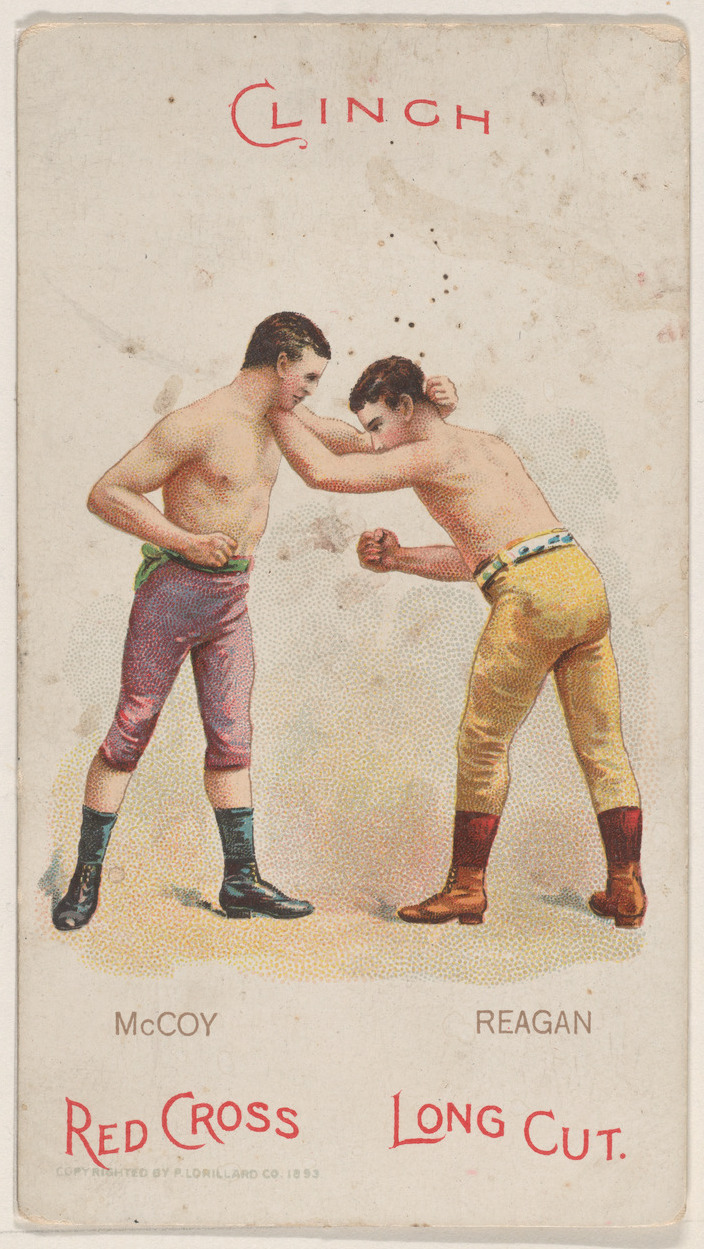
Boxer (left) using collar tie against boxer (right) using cross collar tie

- Collar tie also known as the head pull, is a clinch technique. From a closed stance the boxer uses the lead hand to grab the opponent's rear side collar or the back of their neck and their forearm presses against the opponent's collarbone or the back of their neck to control their posture and head movement. If the boxer uses their rear hand in a closed stance they would grab their opponents lead side. The goal is to control the opponent's head by bending it down. This allows the boxer to set up attacks like uppercuts and hooks, or to create angles. A properly executed collar tie involves pressing the elbow to the chest and using the forearm to create a strong frame, preventing the opponent from escaping or generating power for their own attacks. When one collar tie is used it is called a single collar tie and when two collar ties are used it is called a double collar tie.
- Cross collar tie also known as a forearm smash, is a clinch technique. From a closed stance the boxer uses the lead hand to go across their body to grab the opponent's lead side collar, or the back of their neck and their forearm presses against the opponent's collarbone or the back of their neck to control their posture and head movement. If the boxer uses their rear hand in a closed stance they would cross their body and grab their opponents rear side. The goal is to control the opponent's head by bending it down and to the side. This allows the boxer to set up attacks like uppercuts and hooks, or to create angles. A properly executed cross collar tie involves using the forearm to create a strong frame, preventing the opponent from escaping or generating power for their own attacks. The boxer can also grab the opponent's shoulder and pull it down and to the side in the same way as they would against their opponent's head. The cross collar tie is often used with an elbow tie on the same side to keep an opponent from punching and allowing the boxer to circle outside of their opponent.

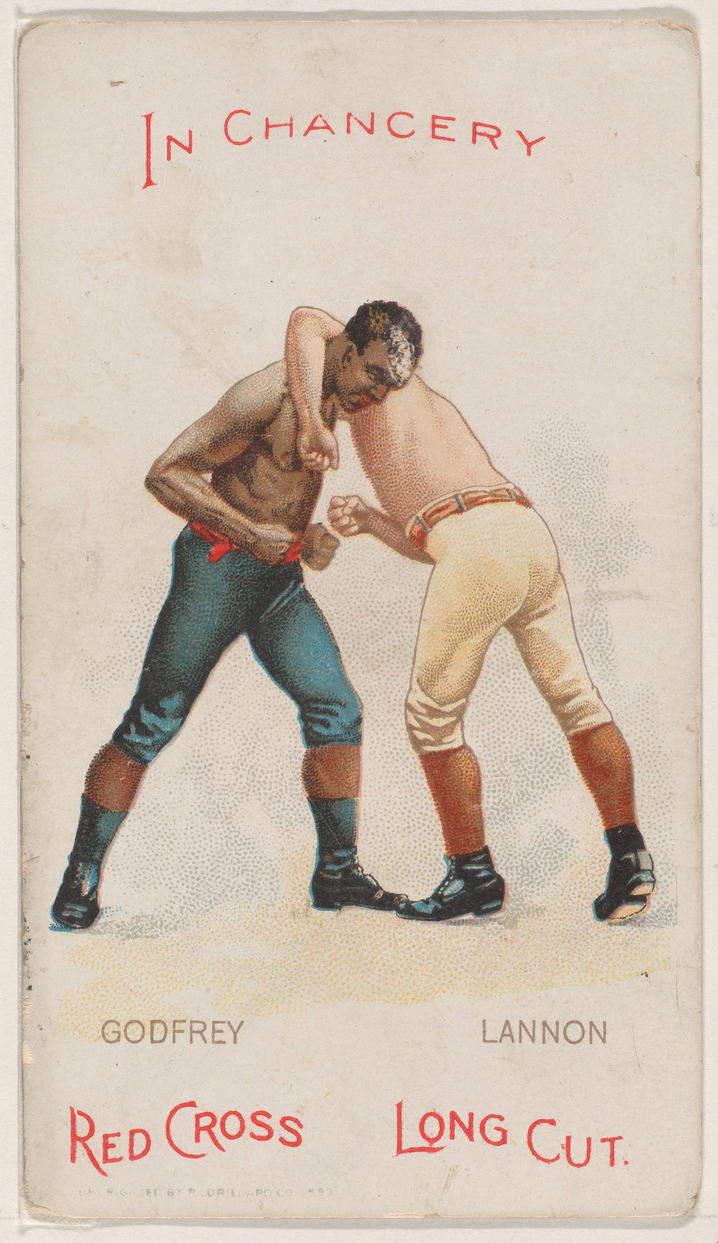
Boxer (right) using front headlock

- Front headlock or chancery, is when a fighter secures a clinch, then uses their shoulder and arm to lock the opponent's head under their armpit. An opponent will often go for a headlock to get out of a defensive body lock that has been applied. To defend against this headlock, one should walk their hips under for a straighter posture and use their legs to lift up. This action will either force the opponent to release the grip or lift them off their feet.

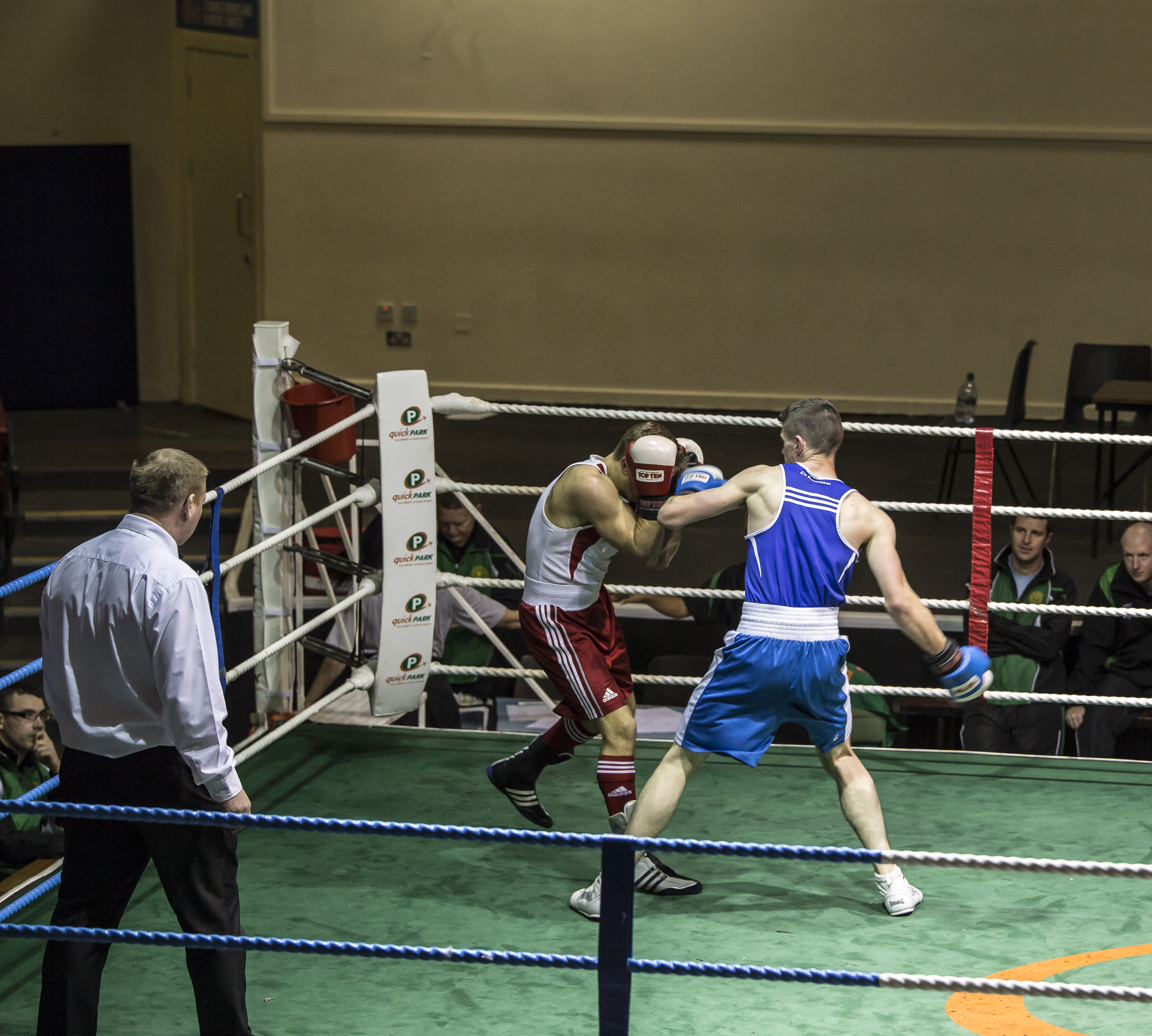
Boxer (right) using framing against boxer (left) using High Guard

- Framing is a defensive technique where a boxer uses their hand, forearm, or body to control an opponent's position, create distance, or disrupt their balance. By establishing a physical barrier, framing can prevent punches, set up counters, manipulate an opponent's guard, or create openings for a boxer's own attacks. Boxing utilizes different frames, including entrance frames for closing distance and exit frames for creating space after an attack.

=== Guards ===
There are four main defensive positions (guards or styles) used in boxing:

All fighters have their own variations to these styles. Some fighters may have their guard higher for more head protection while others have their guard lower to provide better protection against body punches. Many fighters don't strictly use a single position, but rather adapt to the situation when choosing a certain position to protect them.

Peek-a-Boo—a defensive style often used by a fighter where the hands are placed in front of the boxer's face, like in the babies' game of the same name. It offers extra protection to the face and makes it easier to jab the opponent's face. Peek-a-Boo boxing was developed by legendary trainer Cus D'Amato. Peek-a-Boo boxing utilizes relaxed hands with the forearms in front of the face and the fist at nose-eye level. Other unique features includes side to side head movements, bobbing, weaving and blind siding your opponent. The number system e.g. 3-2-3-Body-head-body or 3-3-2 Body-Body-head is drilled with a stationary dummy called the "Willie bag", named by Cus after boxer Willie Pastrano, until the fighter is able to punch rapid combinations with what D'Amato called "bad intentions." The theory behind the style is that when combined with effective bobbing and weaving head movement, the fighter has a very strong defense and becomes more elusive, able to throw hooks and uppercuts with great effectiveness. Also it allows swift neck movements as well quick duckings and bad returning damage, usually by rising uppercuts or even rising hooks. Since it is a defense designed for close range fighting, it is mainly used by in-fighters. Bobo Olson was the first known champion to use this as a defense.

Crab style guards: Work at all ranges, allowing fighters to defend while countering—such as using a lead arm to block jabs while keeping the rear hand free to punch. The style adapts to different boxing approaches: infighters use it to advance safely, out-boxers rely on one-handed defense to strike while evading, and sluggers use it to cover up after missed power shots. Its flexibility makes it effective for both offense and defense. The many variations of this defense include:

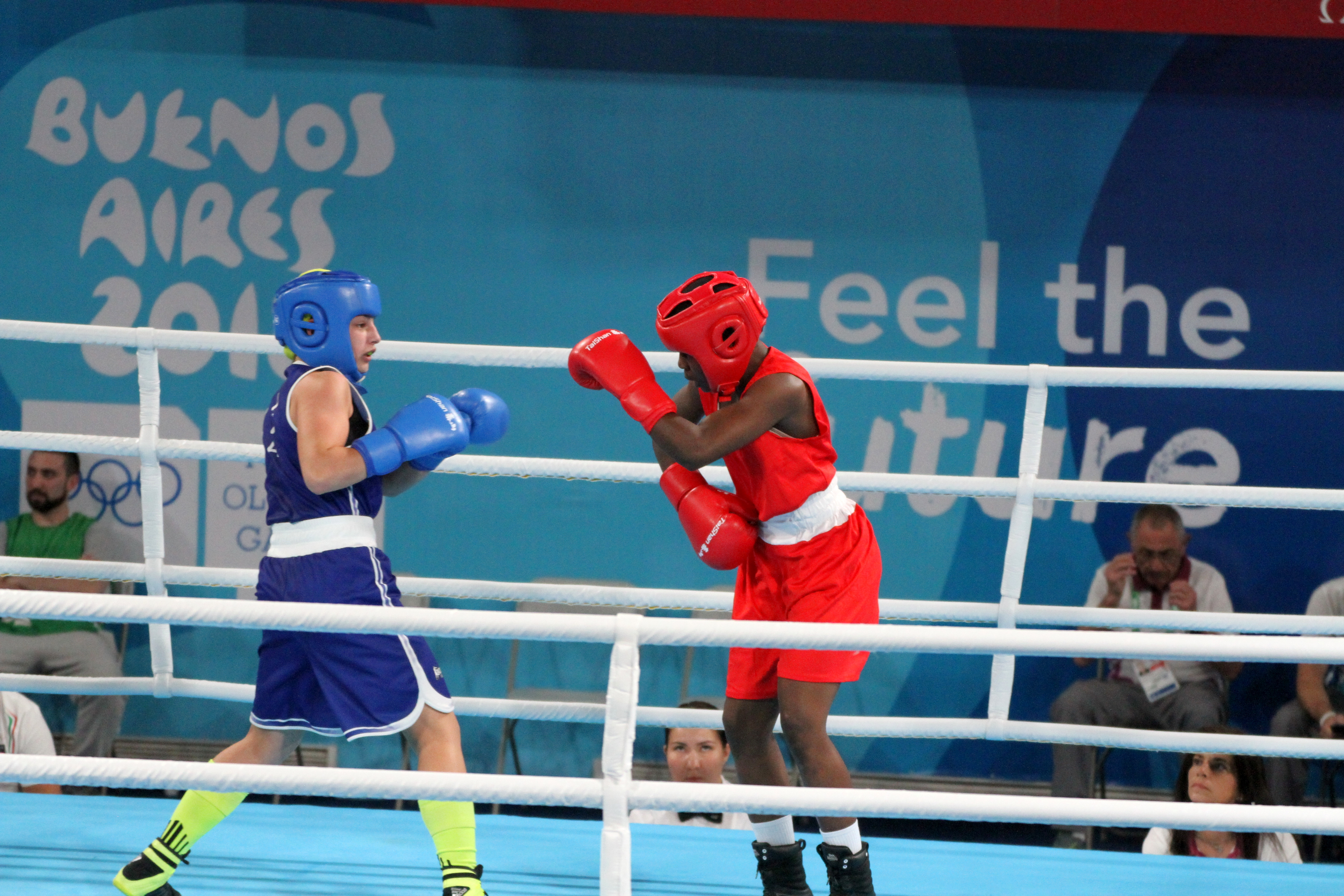
Boxer (right) using cross-armed guard

- Cross-armed guard (sometimes known as the armadillo) - the forearms are placed on top of each other horizontally in front of the face with the glove of one arm being on the top of the elbow of the other arm. This style is greatly varied when the back hand (right for an orthodox fighter and left for a southpaw) rises vertically. In some cases, one hand is across the face with the forearm horizontal or diagonal. While the other lies low, protecting the body. This style is used for reducing head damage at close range, but can be used to defend the body as well. The only head punch that a fighter is susceptible to is a punch to the top of the head. The body is open if the guard is kept high, but most fighters who use this style bend and lean to protect the body, but while upright and unaltered the body is there to be hit. This position can be difficult to counterpunch from for beginners, but can be highly effective for counterpunching by more experienced fighters. It also virtually eliminates all head damage. In close range a slightly crouched posture can be used and usually a front foot heavy squared stance. Meaning that the now protected head of the boxer, is a closer target than the body. However, this guard is also effective in a bladed stance and while moving or leaning backwards to block an opponent's counterpunches after a missed punch.
- Reverse cross-armed guard - The forearms can be placed on top of each other horizontally or diagonally in front of the face with the lead arm (left for an orthodox fighter and right for a southpaw) being on the top of the rear arm with lead glove over the rear shoulder. The position of the lead arm (left for an orthodox fighter and right for a southpaw) is greatly varied when it rises vertically.

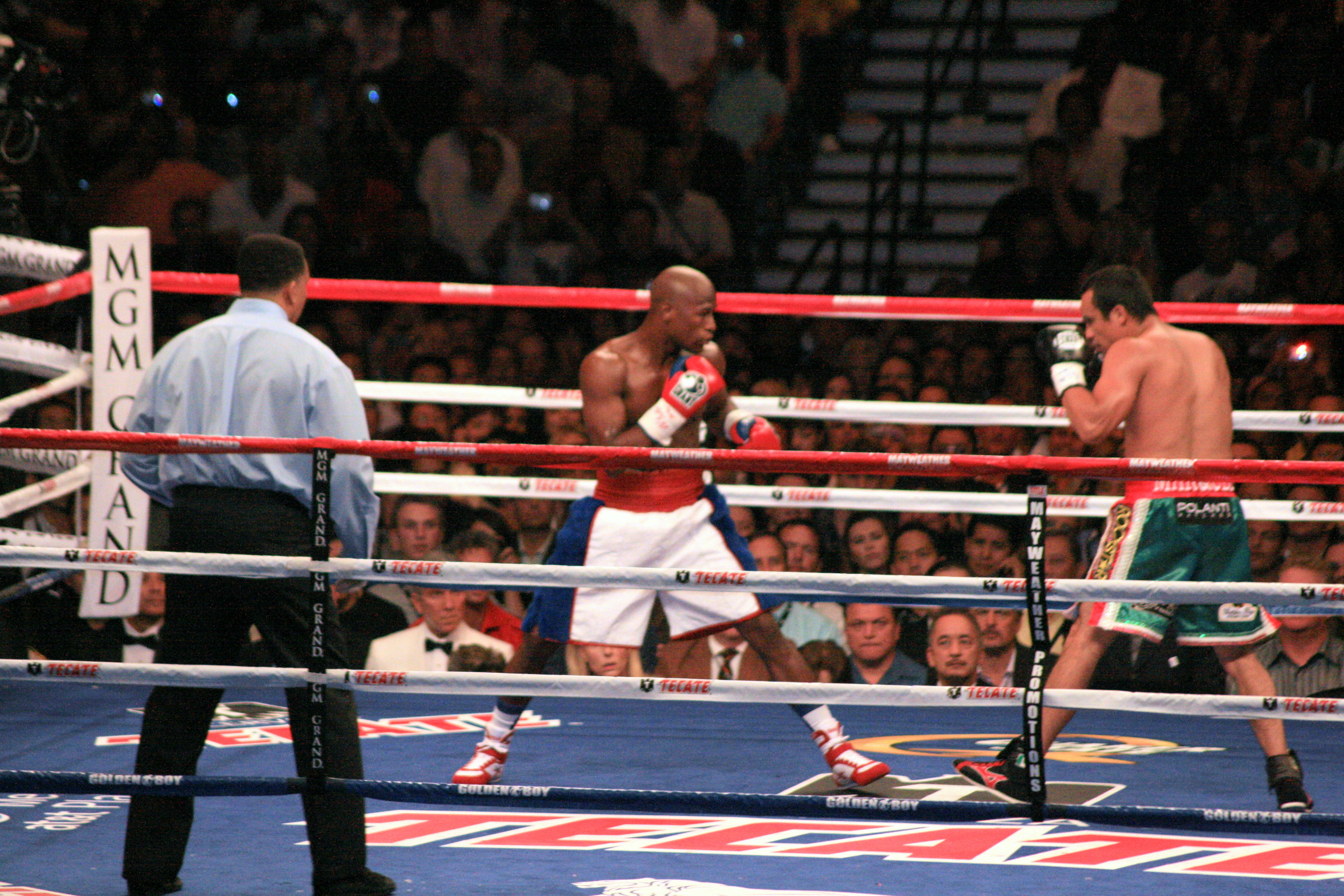
Floyd Mayweather Jr. (left) using Michigan Defense against Juan Manuel Márquez

- Philly Shell or Michigan Defense—This is a variation of the cross-armed guard. The lead arm (left for an orthodox fighter and right for a southpaw) is placed across the abdomen, below the rear arm, to protect the body. The head is titled towards the rear shoulder to keep the head off of center-line, and to make space to use the shoulder to block. The lead shoulder is brought in tight against the side of the face. The rear hand can be placed next to the chin close to the rear shoulder (right side for orthodox fighters and left side for southpaws) to defend against hook punches, placed in a cross block position, with the rear hand over the lead shoulder to protect against straight punches, or on the centerline to be able to rotate between a hook cover and a cross block or punch catch position. This style is used by fighters who like to counterpunch. To execute this guard a fighter must be very athletic and experienced. This style is so effective for counterpunching because it allows fighters to slip punches by rotating and dipping their upper body and causing blows to glance off the fighter. After the punch glances off, the fighter's back hand is in perfect position to hit their out-of-position opponent. The weakness to this style is that when a fighter is stationary and not rotating they are open to be hit so a fighter must be athletic and well conditioned to effectively execute this style. To beat this style, fighters like to jab their opponents shoulder causing the shoulder and arm to be in pain and to demobilize that arm. But if mastered and perfected it can be an effective way to play defense in the sport of boxing.

Long guards, also known as Extended Guard: In boxing these guards are often used by taller fighters or fighters with longer reach to keep opponents out of punching range, but shorter fighters or fighters with shorter reach often use them intermittently. Variations include:

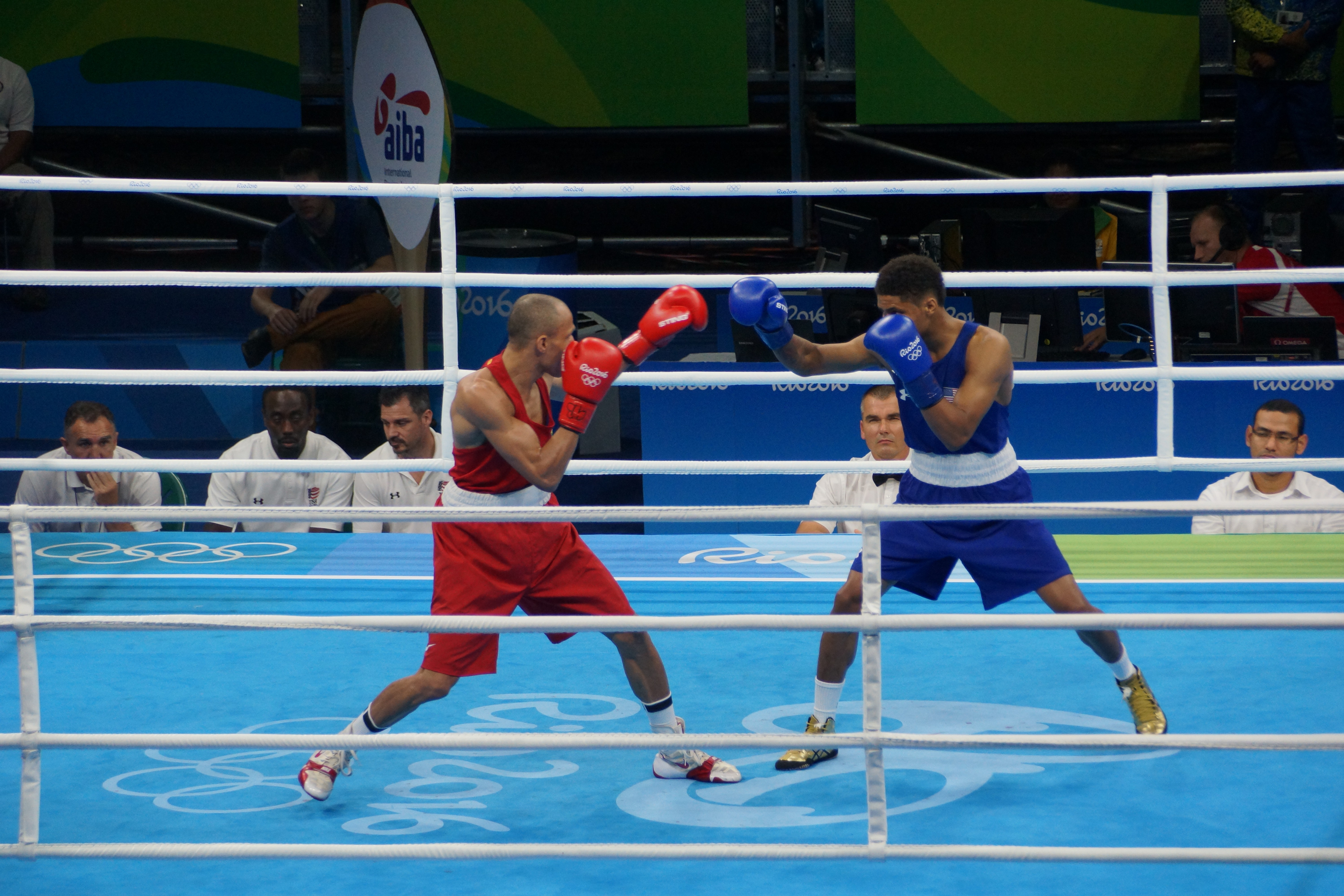
Boxers using classic long guard

- Classic long guard - This is a hybrid guard that combines the extended lead arm of the mummy guard with the rear hand in a classic guard, typically positioned at a 90-degree angle near the face. Advantages include the lead hand controls distance, blocks vision, parries, traps hands, and frames. The rear hand remains ready for power punches and defends against hooks. Disadvantages include a weak passive defense against uppercuts and straights that bypass the lead arm. Powerful lead hooks and uppercuts are harder to throw since the arm must retract first, telegraphing the punch. It exposes the lead side of the body and allows opponents to gauge reach and distance easily.

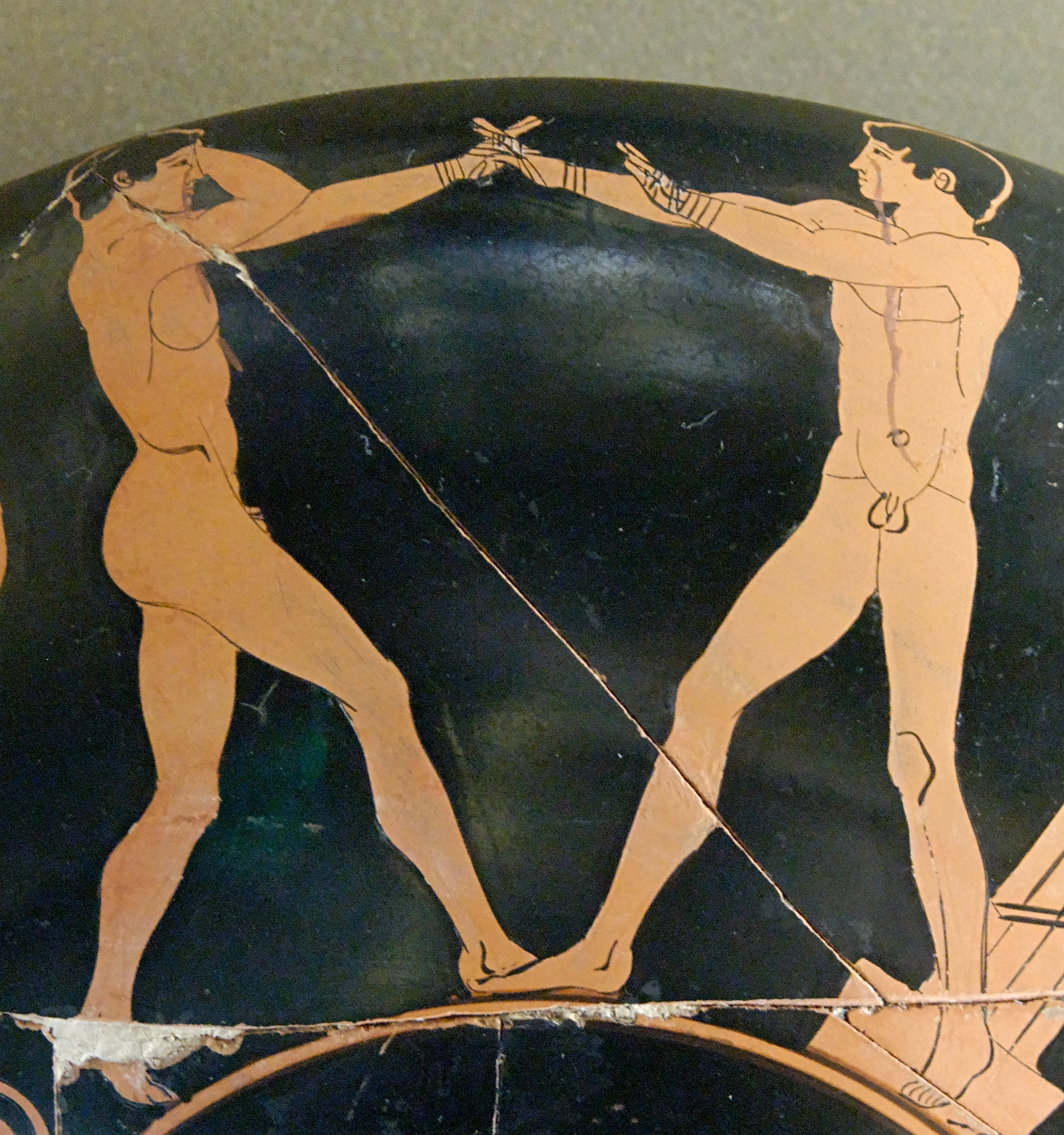
Boxer (left) using Dracula guard and boxer (right) using mummy guard on pottery dated to 470 BC

- Mummy guard is a boxing stance where both arms are extended with slightly bent elbows and palms facing the opponent, while the chin is tucked and shoulders are raised for protection. This guard allows fighters to block their opponent's vision and smother jabs, particularly against Classic or Peek-a-boo guards, though it is less effective against low-hand styles like the Crab Guards. Taller fighters benefit from this stance as it discourages hooks and uppercuts, while shorter fighters can adjust by raising their shoulders and tucking elbows. However, the Mummy Guard limits power punches since strikes require retracting the arms first, telegraphing movements and leaving the lead side vulnerable. Additionally, opponents can exploit lateral movement to close the distance and land punches before the extended arms can react.
- Dracula guard - A hybrid boxing guard that combines elements of the extended lead arm of the Mummy guard and the rear hand in a Cross Guard positioned for defense. Named for its resemblance to Dracula hiding behind a cape, it uses the lead arm to block vision, control distance, parry, and trap hands, while the rear hand remains ready for power punches and defense. Advantages include that it is good for obscuring vision and setting up traps. Allows quick jabs and rear hand power punches. Protects against straight punches, hooks, and uppercuts. Disadvantages include it limits powerful lead hooks and uppercuts as it requires pulling the arm back first, telegraphing the strike. Exposes the lead side of the body and makes reach more predictable.

Classic guards or Basic Guards: The modern Classic Guards are often the first Guards taught to boxers as the initial guard position is easy to learn, and they are effective against haymakers, which is the type of punch many untrained fighters and beginners use often. Guards fitting into this category include:

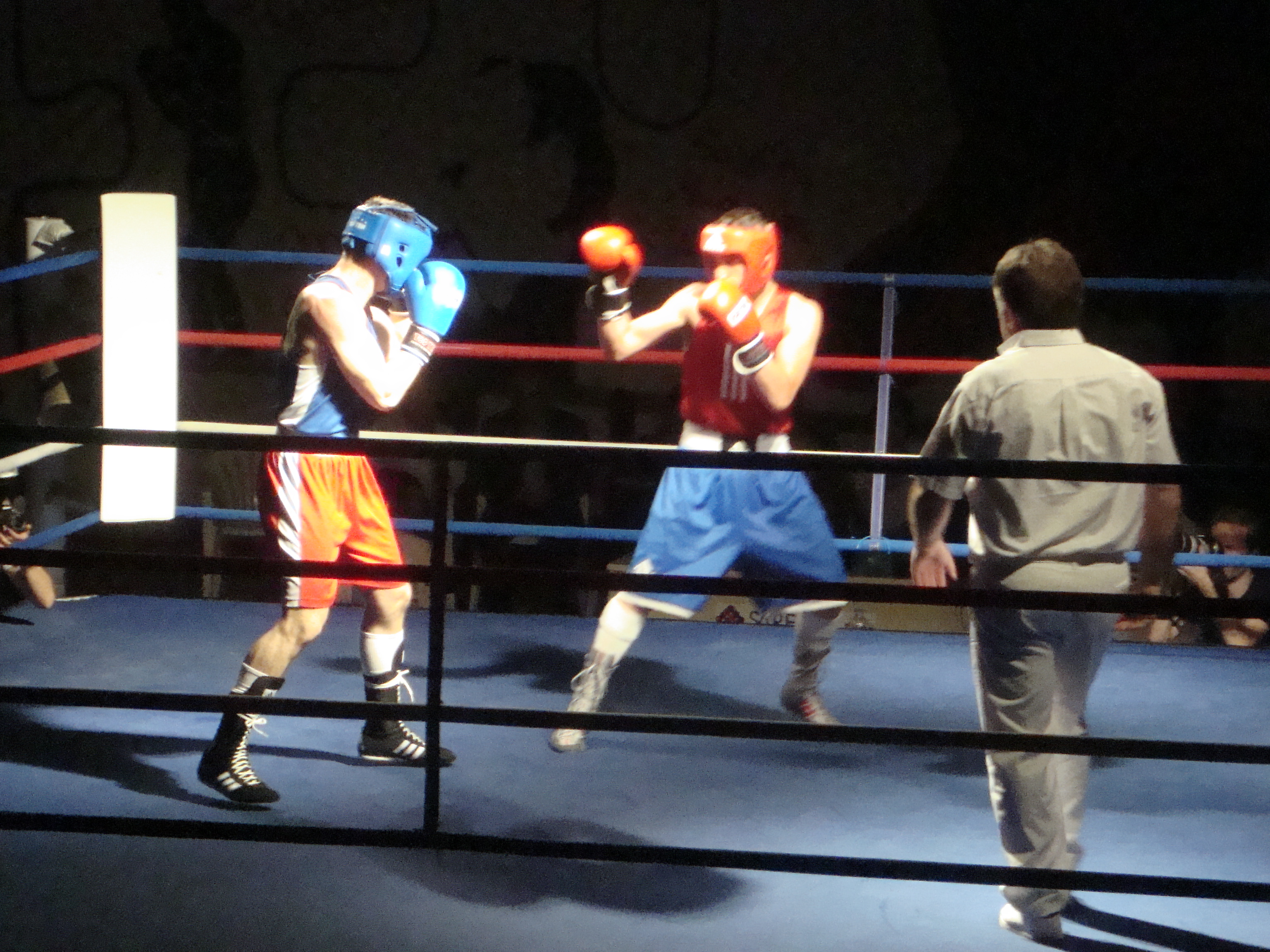
Boxer (right) using a traditional guard

- Traditional guard - This guard involves bending both arms at 90 degrees or less, with the lead arm extended slightly away from the head and the rear fist held near the chin or jaw. This guard offers passive defense against hooks by using the gloves, forearms, and elbows to block, while the bent-arm position allows for powerful punches and better visibility than other classic guards. However, it leaves the centerline exposed, requiring quick reflexes and active defense, like parries, against straight punches and uppercuts, which can be difficult to master due to the need for specific blocking. The guard also limits close-range effectiveness and lateral movement, as the high hand position makes punches more predictable, and reliance on blocking with the hands can delay counterpunching opportunities.

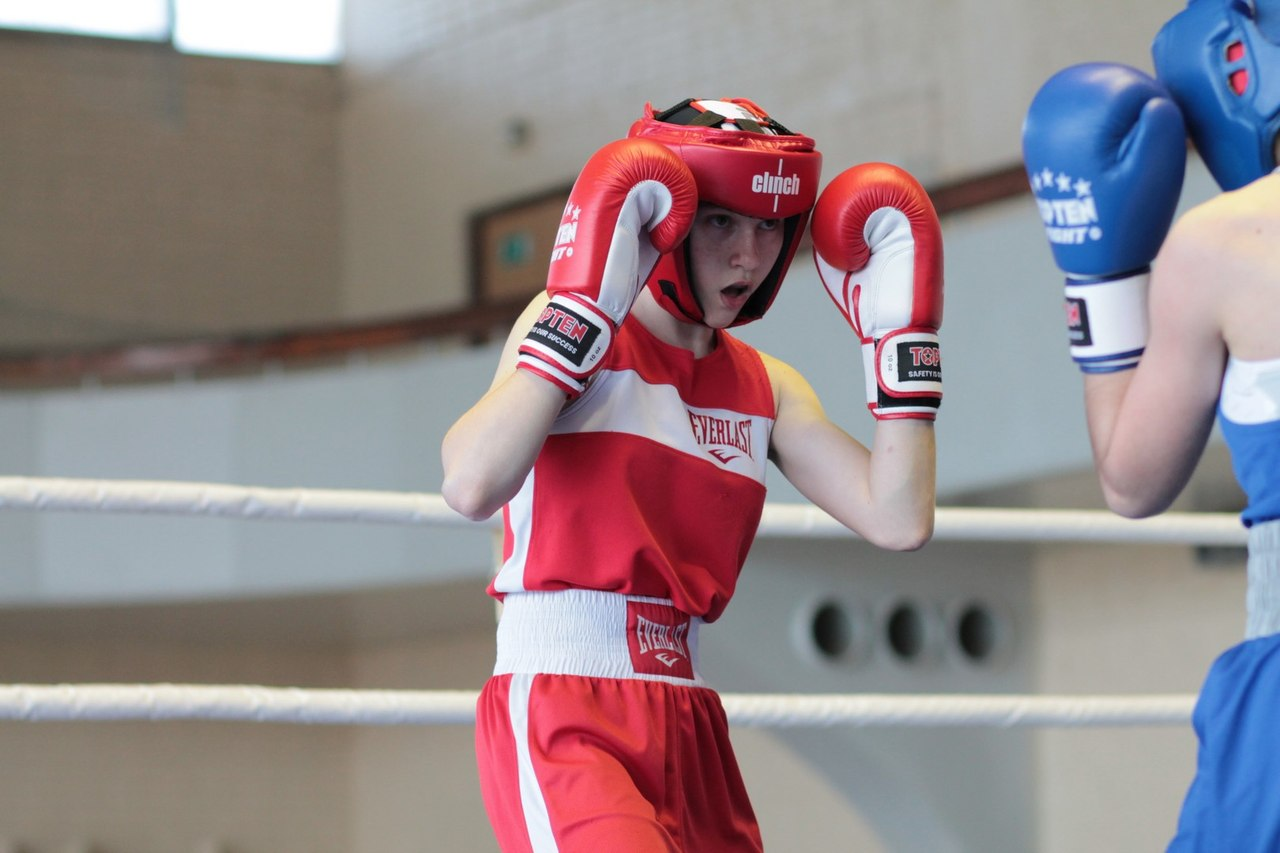
Boxer using a conventional guard

- Conventional guard - This guard involves holding both arms bent at 90 degrees or less, with the lead arm guarding the side of the head and the rear fist near the face or chin, offering passive defense against hooks by using gloves and elbows while enabling powerful punches due to the bent-arm position. It benefits fighters with slower reflexes by keeping hands closer for quicker blocks and parries but limits visibility and leaves the centerline exposed, requiring active defense against straight punches and uppercuts. It lacks redundant defense lines, relying heavily on hand blocks, which can delay counterpunches and make fighters vulnerable to hand traps, framing, and predictable punches. Mastering this guard demands high defensive specificity despite its initial ease of learning.

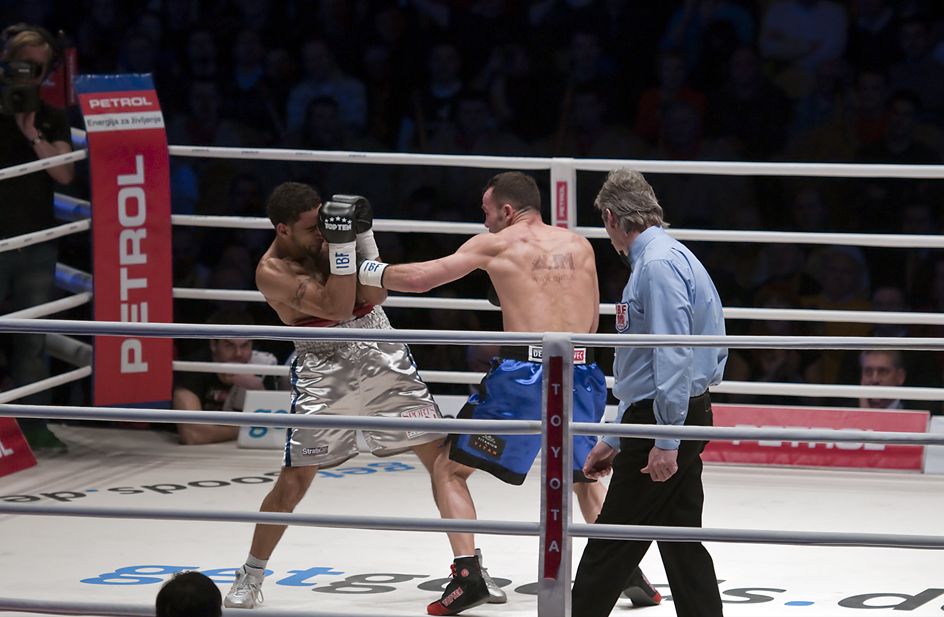
Boxer (left) using a high guard

- High guard - This guard involves bending both arms at 90 degrees or less, positioning the gloves in front of the face at eyebrow level, with hands resembling holding binoculars or making a heart shape, with raised shoulders to protect the jaw and elbows pressed together to block uppercuts. Its advantages include ease of learning, passive defense against straight punches, uppercuts, partial defense against hooks, and better power generation due to bent arms, while also protecting the centerline. However, it limits visibility, allows opponents to close distance more easily, leaves ears and jaw exposed to hooks, and exposes the lower body to attacks, relying heavily on forearm blocking, which can cause cumulative damage. Additionally, it offers only one line of defense, makes counterpunching slower, and leaves fighters vulnerable to hand traps, framing, and split guards, though skilled boxers can bait opponents into counterattacks.

=== Unorthodox strategies ===
- Rope-a-dope: Used by Muhammad Ali in his 1974 "the Rumble in the Jungle" bout against George Foreman, the rope-a-dope method involves lying back against the ropes, covering up defensively as much as possible and allowing the opponent to attempt numerous punches. The back-leaning posture, which does not cause the defending boxer to become as unbalanced as he would during normal backward movement, also maximizes the distance of the defender's head from his opponent, increasing the probability that punches will miss their intended target. Weathering the blows that do land, the defender lures the opponent into expending energy while conserving his/her own. If successful, the attacking opponent will eventually tire, creating defensive flaws which the boxer can exploit. In modern boxing, the rope-a-dope is generally discouraged since most opponents are not fooled by it and few boxers possess the physical toughness to withstand a prolonged, unanswered assault. Recently, however, eight-division world champion Manny Pacquiao skillfully used the strategy to gauge the power of welterweight titlist Miguel Cotto in November 2009. Pacquiao followed up the rope-a-dope gambit with a withering knockdown. Tyson Fury also attempted this against Francesco Pianeto but did not pull it off as smoothly.
- Bolo punch: Occasionally seen in Olympic boxing, the bolo punch is an arm punch which owes its power to the shortening of a circular arc rather than to transference of body weight; it tends to have more of an effect due to the surprise of the odd angle it lands at rather than the actual power of the punch. This is more of a gimmick than a technical maneuver; this punch is not taught, being on the same plane in boxing technicality as is the Ali shuffle. Nevertheless, a few professional boxers have used the bolo-punch to great effect, including former welterweight champions Sugar Ray Leonard, and Kid Gavilán as well as current British fighter Chris Eubank Jr. Middleweight champion Ceferino Garcia is regarded as the inventor of the bolo punch.
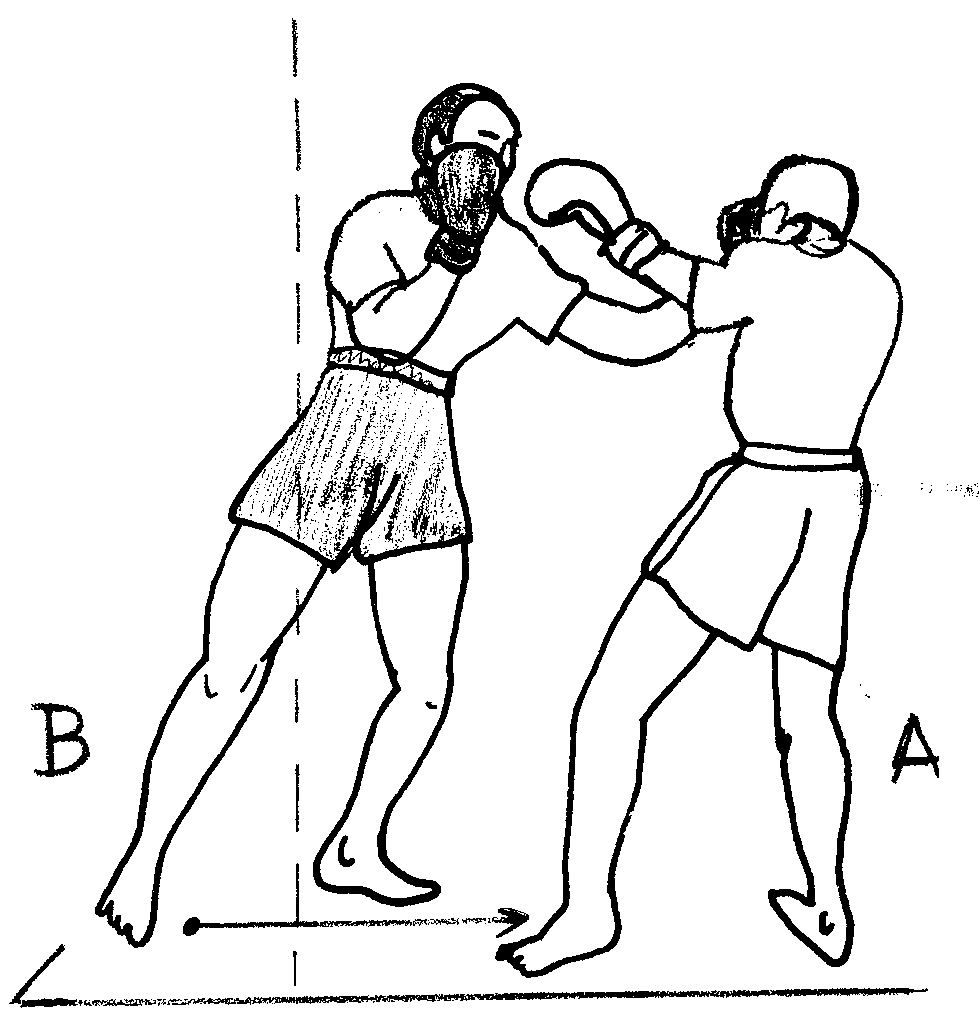
Bolo punch

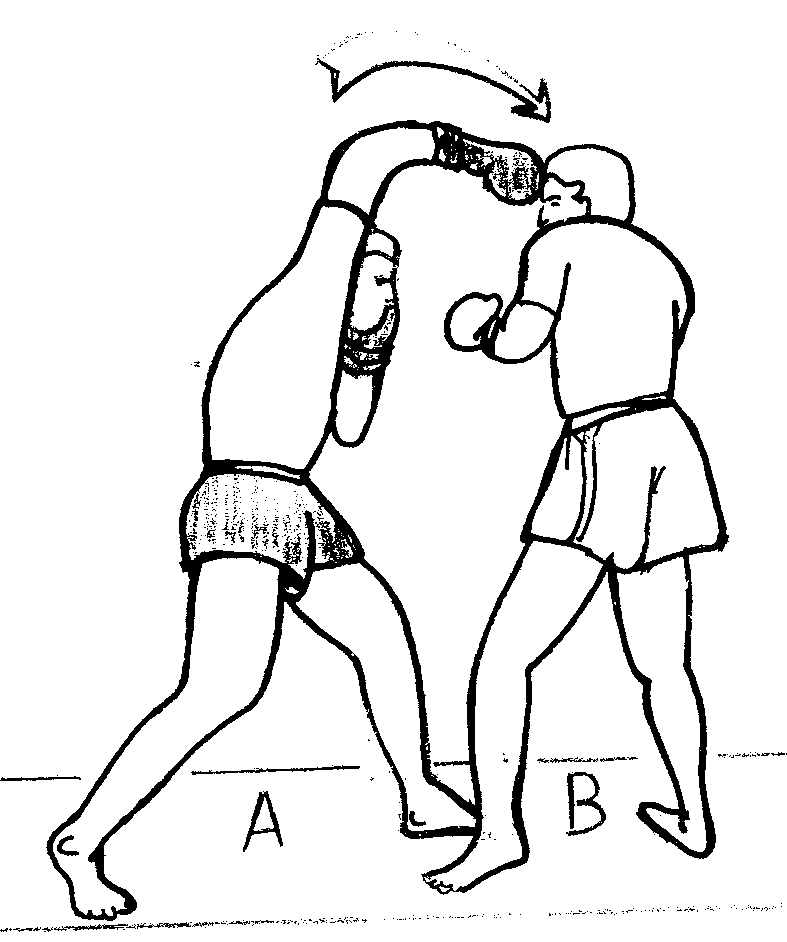
Overhand (overcut)
- Overhand: The overhand is a punch, thrown from the rear hand, not found in every boxer's arsenal. Unlike the cross, which has a trajectory parallel to the ground, the overhand has a looping circular arc as it is thrown over the shoulder with the palm facing away from the boxer. It is especially popular with smaller stature boxers trying to reach taller opponents. Boxers who have used this punch consistently and effectively include former heavyweight champions Rocky Marciano and Tim Witherspoon, as well as MMA champions Chuck Liddell and Fedor Emelianenko. The overhand has become a popular weapon in other tournaments that involve fist striking. Deontay Wilder heavily favours and is otherwise known for knocking many of his opponents out with one of his right overhands.
- Check hook: A check hook is employed to prevent aggressive boxers from lunging in. There are two parts to the check hook. The first part consists of a regular hook. The second, trickier part involves the footwork. As the opponent lunges in, the boxer should throw the hook and pivot on his left foot and swing his right foot 180 degrees around. If executed correctly, the aggressive boxer will lunge in and sail harmlessly past his opponent like a bull missing a matador. This is rarely seen in professional boxing as it requires a great disparity in skill level to execute. Technically speaking it has been said that there is no such thing as a check hook and that it is simply a hook applied to an opponent that has lurched forward and past his opponent who simply hooks him on the way past. Others have argued that the check hook exists but is an illegal punch due to it being a pivot punch which is illegal in the sport. Floyd Mayweather Jr. employed the use of a check hook against Ricky Hatton, which sent Hatton flying head first into the corner post and being knocked down.

=== Recovery ===
Fast recovery is essential in boxing. It may involve regaining energy, breath or balance. A boxer must learn to recover as quickly as possible after throwing a punch, dodging or performing any other boxing move. As it can be a very physically intense sport, the ability to recover actively and quickly during or after exchanges with an opponent becomes even more important. While these periods of recovery may be very brief it is crucial that they are achieved in order for the boxer to remain effective and avoid fatigue. A boxer may move away from their opponent in order to give them a greater chance to recover without having it immediately disrupted by them.

Effective recovery should also be sought between rounds. Typically, a boxer will have one minutes rest between three minute rounds and it is important that this time is used effectively. Similarly to attempting to recover during the round itself, there is an attempt to consciously maximise how much recovery takes place during this minute with there continuing to be a strong focus on regaining energy and breath. A healthy diet and adequate, good quality sleep improves a boxer's ability to recover both during and between rounds. These factors also mean that they recover more in the long term and adapt more effectively over time, both mentally and physically, to the requirements of the sport.

One training regime which has a similar alternating pattern of explosive movements and rapid recovery to boxing, is high intensity interval training (HIIT). It involves periods of intense action followed by quick recovery phases. For example, 20 seconds of jumping followed by 20 seconds rest, then 20 seconds of jumping again and so forth. The ability to quickly recover which is gained from it transfers effectively to the skillset required in boxing.

== Ring corner ==
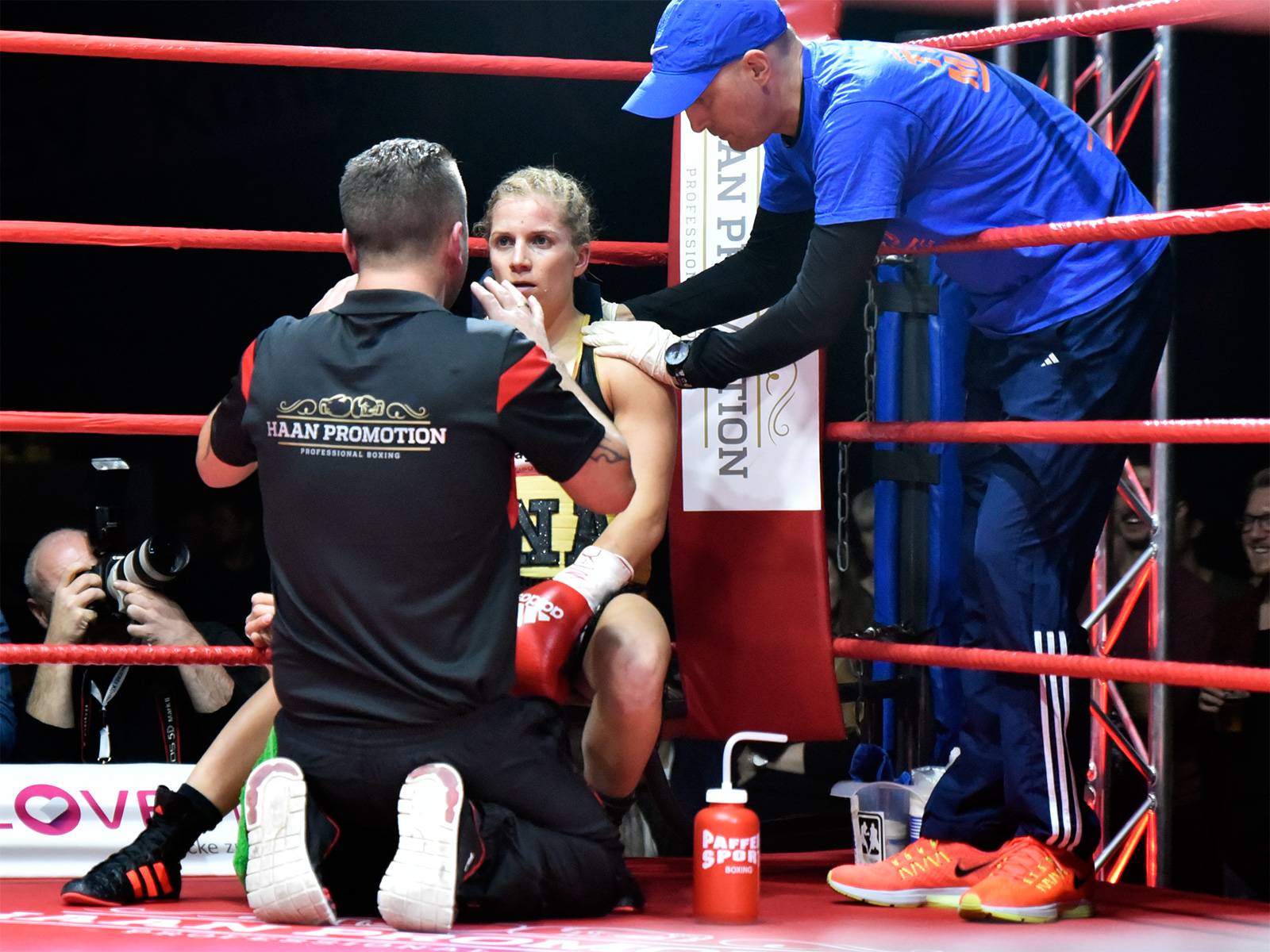
Boxer Tina Rupprecht receiving instructions from her trainer while being treated by her cutman in the ring corner between rounds

In boxing, each fighter is given a corner of the ring where they rest in between rounds for one minute and where their trainers stand. Typically, three individuals stand in the corner besides the boxer; these are the trainer, the assistant trainer and the cutman. The trainer and assistant typically give advice to the boxer on what they are doing wrong as well as encouraging them if they are losing. The cutman is a cutaneous doctor responsible for keeping the boxer's face and eyes free of cuts, blood and excessive swelling. This is of particular importance because many fights are stopped because of cuts or swelling that threaten the boxer's eyes.

In addition, the corner is responsible for stopping the fight if they feel their fighter is in grave danger of permanent injury. The corner will occasionally throw in a white towel to signify a boxer's surrender (the idiomatic phrase "to throw in the towel", meaning to give up, derives from this practice). This can be seen in the fight between Diego Corrales and Floyd Mayweather. In that fight, Corrales' corner surrendered despite Corrales' steadfast refusal.

== Health concerns ==
Participating in boxing causes physical injuries. Injuries to the head are most commonly experienced by participants. Deaths of boxers during or after a bout from injuries received in the ring do occur. A 2011 study of bouts from 1890 to 2011 calculated an average mortality rate of 13 participants per year for the years studied. An Australian study published in the Journal of Science and Medicine in Sport in 2022 found that efforts made to improve safety in the sport in 2011 were unsuccessful at preventing deaths of participants in the sport.

Striking an individual unconscious or even inflicting a concussion could result in permanent brain damage. There is no clear division between the force required to knock a person out and the force likely to kill a person. Additionally, contact sports, especially combat sports, are directly related to an irreversible neurological disease known as chronic traumatic encephalopathy (CTE). This disease begins during the athlete's life and continues even after sports activity has ceased.

In March 1981, neurosurgeon Fred Sonstein sought to use CT scans to track the degeneration of boxers' cognitive functions after seeing the decline of Bennie Briscoe. From 1980 to 2007, more than 200 amateur boxers, professional boxers and Toughman fighters died due to ring or training injuries. In 1983, editorials in the Journal of the American Medical Association called for a ban on boxing. The editor, George Lundberg, called boxing an "obscenity" that "should not be sanctioned by any civilized society". Since then, the British, Canadian, and Australian Medical Associations have called for bans on boxing.

Supporters of the ban argue that boxing is the only sport in which hurting the other athlete is the goal. Bill O'Neill, boxing spokesman for the British Medical Association (BMA), has supported the BMA's proposed ban on boxing: "It is the only sport where the intention is to inflict serious injury on your opponent, and we feel that we must have a total ban on boxing." Opponents respond that such a position is misguided opinion, stating that amateur boxing is scored solely according to total connecting blows with no award for "injury". They observe that many skilled professional boxers have had rewarding careers without inflicting injury on opponents by accumulating scoring blows and avoiding punches winning rounds scored 10–9 by the 10-point must system, and they note that there are many other sports where concussions are much more prevalent. However, the data show that the concussion rate in boxing is the highest of all contact sports. In addition, repetitive and subconcussive blows to the head, and not just concussions, cause CTE, and evidence indicates that brain damage and the effects of CTE are more severe in boxing.

In 2007, one study of amateur boxers showed that protective headgear did not prevent brain damage, and another found that amateur boxers faced a high risk of brain damage. The Gothenburg study analyzed temporary levels of neurofilament light in cerebrospinal fluid which they conclude is evidence of damage, even though the levels soon subside. More comprehensive studies of neurological function on larger samples performed by Johns Hopkins University in 1994 and accident rates analyzed by National Safety Council in 2017 show amateur boxing is a comparatively safe sport due to the regulations of amateur boxing and a greater control of the athletes, although the studies did not focus on CTE or its long-term effects. In addition, effective training methods and a short career can reduce the effects of brain damage.

In 1997, the American Association of Professional Ringside Physicians was established to develop medical protocols, based on research and education, to prevent injuries in boxing.

Professional boxing is forbidden in Iceland, Iran, and North Korea. It was banned in Sweden until 2007, when the ban was lifted, but strict restrictions, including four three-minute rounds for fights, were imposed. Boxing was banned in Albania from 1965 until the fall of communism in 1991. Norway legalized professional boxing in December 2014.

The International Boxing Association (AIBA) restricted the use of head guards for senior male competitors at the World Championships and the Olympics after 2013. A literature review study analyses present knowledge about protecting headgear and injury prevention in boxing to determine if injury risks associated with not head guard usage increased. The literature review indicates that head guards provide effective protection against lacerations and skull fractures. Therefore, AIBA's decision to terminate the head guard must be considered cautiously, and injury rates among (male) boxers should be continuously evaluated.

=== Possible health benefits ===
Like other active and dynamic sports, boxing may be argued to provide some general health benefits, such as fat burning, increased muscle tone, strong bones and ligaments, cardiovascular fitness, muscular endurance, improved core stability, coordination and body awareness, strength and power, stress relief, and self-esteem. Aside from the physical health benefits of boxing, there are also plenty of mental health benefits that comes with participating in the sport. Boxing and communities like a neighborhood boxing gym has been linked to positive mental effects like being able to overcome adversity, how to deal with losses and gaining a sense of self in young people. Like many sports boxing is no different even though its seen as a non-team sport, communities like the boxing gym help promote a sense of belonging which in turn can cause happiness specially with the youth. Boxing can also be used as development therapy with people with down syndrome, using heavy bags and boxing pads to help develop hand-eye coordination and mental focus.

== Boxing Halls of Fame ==
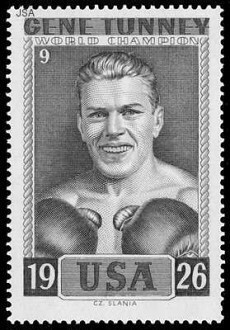
A stamp honoring heavyweight champion Gene Tunney

The sport of boxing has two internationally recognized boxing halls of fame; the International Boxing Hall of Fame (IBHOF) and the Boxing Hall of Fame Las Vegas. The latter opened in Las Vegas, Nevada in 2013 and was founded by Steve Lott, former assistant manager for Mike Tyson.

The International Boxing Hall of Fame (IBHOF) opened in Canastota, New York in 1989. The first inductees in 1990 included Jack Johnson, Benny Leonard, Jack Dempsey, Henry Armstrong, Sugar Ray Robinson, Archie Moore, and Muhammad Ali. Other world-class figures include Salvador Sanchez, Jose Napoles, Roberto "Manos de Piedra" Durán, Ricardo Lopez, Gabriel "Flash" Elorde, Vicente Saldivar, Ismael Laguna, Eusebio Pedroza, Carlos Monzón, Azumah Nelson, Rocky Marciano, Manny Pacquiao, Pipino Cuevas, Wilfred Benitez, Wilfredo Gomez, Felix Trinidad and Ken Buchanan. The Hall of Fame's induction ceremony is held every June as part of a four-day event. The fans who come to Canastota for the Induction Weekend are treated to a number of events, including scheduled autograph sessions, boxing exhibitions, a parade featuring past and present inductees, and the induction ceremony itself.

The Boxing Hall of Fame Las Vegas features the $75 million ESPN Classic Sports fight film and tape library and radio broadcast collection. The collection includes the fights of many great champions, including: Muhammad Ali, Mike Tyson, George Foreman, Roberto Durán, Marvin Hagler, Jack Dempsey, Joe Louis, Joe Frazier, Rocky Marciano and Sugar Ray Robinson. It is this exclusive fight film library that will separate the Boxing Hall of Fame Las Vegas from the other halls of fame which do not have rights to any video of their sports. The inaugural inductees included Muhammad Ali, Henry Armstrong, Tony Canzoneri, Ezzard Charles, Julio César Chávez Sr., Jack Dempsey, Roberto Durán, Joe Louis, and Sugar Ray Robinson.

== Governing and sanctioning bodies ==
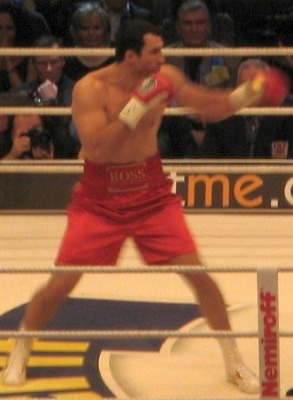
Former WBA, IBF, WBO and IBO heavyweight champion, Ukrainian Wladimir Klitschko in December 2008

Governing bodies

- British Boxing Board of Control (BBBofC)
- European Boxing Union (EBU)
- Nevada State Athletic Commission (NSAC)

Major sanctioning bodies

- World Boxing Association (WBA)
- World Boxing Council (WBC)
- International Boxing Federation (IBF)
- World Boxing Organization (WBO)

Intermediate

- International Boxing Organization (IBO)

Novice

- Intercontinental Boxing Federation (IBFed)

Amateur

- World Boxing
- International Boxing Association (IBA; now also professional)

== Boxing rankings ==
There are various organization and websites, that rank boxers in both weight class and pound-for-pound manner.

- Transnational Boxing Rankings Board (ratings)
- ESPN (ratings)
- The Ring (ratings)
- BoxRec (ratings)
- Fightstat (rating)

== See also ==
- Boxing (disambiguation)
- List of boxing films
- List of current world boxing champions
- List of female boxers
- List of male boxers
- Milling – military training exercise related to boxing
- Undisputed champion
- Weight class in boxing
- Women's boxing
- World Colored Heavyweight Championship

== Bibliography ==
- Robert Anasi (2003). The Gloves: A Boxing Chronicle. North Point Press. ISBN 0-86547-652-7.
- Sam Andre and Nat Fleischer (1988). A Pictorial History of Boxing. Hamlyn. ISBN 0-600-50288-0.
- Baker, Mark Allen (2010). TITLE TOWN, USA: Boxing in Upstate New York. ISBN 978-1-59629-769-2.
- History of London Boxing. BBC News.
- Boddy, Kasia (2019). Boxing: A Cultural History. Reaktion Books. ISBN 978-1-78914-051-4.
- Weight classification, "2009". Encyclopædia Britannica.
- Fleischer, Nat, Sam Andre, Nigel Collins, Dan Rafael (2002). An Illustrated History of Boxing. Citadel Press. ISBN 0-8065-2201-1.
- Fox, James A. (2001). Boxing. Stewart, Tabori and Chang. ISBN 1-58479-133-0.
- Gunn M, Ormerod D. "The Legality of Boxing". Legal Studies. 1995;15:181.
- Halbert, Christy (2003). The Ultimate Boxer: Understanding the Sport and Skills of Boxing. Impact Seminars, Inc. ISBN 0-9630968-5-0.
- Hatmaker, Mark (2004). Boxing Mastery: Advanced Technique, Tactics, and Strategies from the Sweet Science. Tracks Publishing. ISBN 1-884654-21-5.
- "Accidents Take Lives of Young Alumni" (July/August 2005). Illinois Alumni, 18(1), 47.
- Death Under the Spotlight: The Manuel Velazquez Boxing Fatality Collection
- McIlvanney, Hugh (2001). The Hardest Game: McIlvanney on Boxing. McGraw-Hill. ISBN 0-658-02154-0.
- Myler, Patrick (1997). A Century of Boxing Greats: Inside the Ring with the Hundred Best Boxers. Robson Books (UK) / Parkwest Publications (US). ISBN 1-86105-258-8.
- Oates, Joyce Carol. On Boxing (with photographs by John Ranard) (1987, revised edition, 2006)
- Price, Edmund The Science of Self Defence: A Treatise on Sparring and Wrestling, 1867.
- Schulberg, Budd (2007). Ringside: A Treasury of Boxing Reportage. Ivan R. Dee. ISBN 1-56663-749-X.
- Silverman, Jeff (2004). The Greatest Boxing Stories Ever Told: Thirty-Six Incredible Tales from the Ring. The Lyons Press. ISBN 1-59228-479-5.
- Snowdon, David (2013). Writing the Prizefight: Pierce Egan's Boxiana World (Peter Lang Ltd)
- Scully, John. Learn to Box with the Iceman Archived 1 August 2010 at the Wayback Machine
- Ronald J. Ross, M.D., Cole, Monroe, Thompson, Jay S., Kim, Kyung H.: "Boxers: Computed Axial Tomography, Electroencephalography and Neurological Evaluation." Journal of the American Medical Association, Vol. 249, No. 2, 211–213, January 14, 1983.
- U.S. Amateur Boxing Inc. (1994). Coaching Olympic Style Boxing. Cooper Pub Group. ISBN 1-884-12525-5.
- Weston, Stanley; Farhood, Steven (1993). The Ring: Boxing: The 20th Century. Illustrated Books. ISBN 0-7924-5850-8.
